= Spanish cruiser Infanta Maria Teresa =

Armoured cruiser

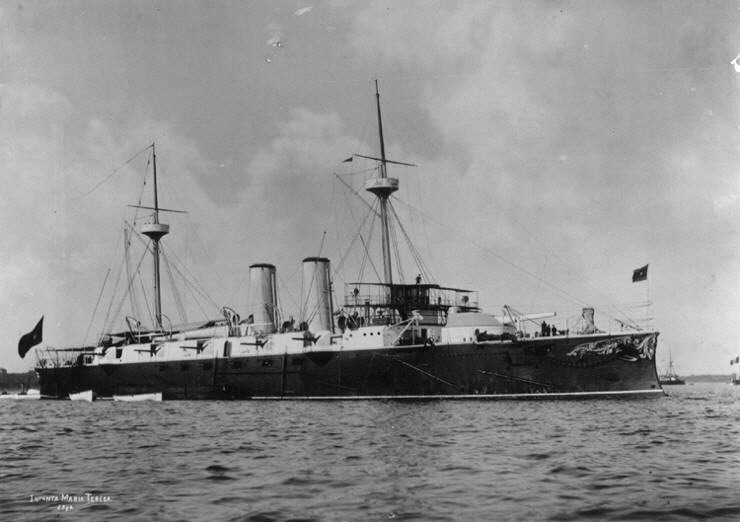
- Infanta María Teresa, probably in 1895 at the opening ceremonies of the Kiel Canal in Germany

History

Spain
- Name: Infanta María Teresa
- Namesake: Maria Theresa of Spain
- Builder: Sociedad Astilleros del Nervión, Sestao, Spain
- Laid down: 24 July 1889
- Launched: 30 August 1890
- Completed: 1893
- Fate: Sunk 3 July 1898; Captured and refloated by U.S. Navy; Abandoned under tow 1 November 1898; Wrecked

General characteristics
- Class & type: Infanta Maria Teresa-class armored cruiser
- Displacement: 6,890 tons
- Length: 364 ft 0 in (110.95 m)
- Beam: 65 ft 2 in (19.86 m)
- Draft: 21 ft 6 in (6.55 m) maximum
- Installed power: 13,700 ihp (10,200 kW)
- Propulsion: 2-shaft vertical triple expansion
- Speed: 20.2 knots (37.4 km/h; 23.2 mph) forced draft
- Complement: 484 officers and enlisted
- Armament: 2 × 28 cm (11.0 in)/35 guns; 10 × 14 cm (5.5 in)/35 guns; 8 × 12-pounder quick-firing guns; 10 × 3-pounder Hotchkiss revolvers; 8 × Nordenfelt machine guns; 2 × Maxim machine guns; 8 × torpedo tubes (2 submerged)
- Armor: Belt: 30.5–25.4 cm (12–10 in); Barbettes: 22.9 cm (9 in); Conning tower: 30.5 cm (12 in); Deck: 5.1–7.6 cm (2–3 in)
- Notes: 1,050 tons of coal (normal)

Infanta María Teresa was the lead ship of her class of armoured cruiser constructed for the Spanish Navy. The ship fought at the Battle of Santiago de Cuba during the Spanish–American War.

== Construction and characteristics ==
The profile of Infanta Maria Teresa

Infanta María Teresa and her sister ships Almirante Oquendo and Vizcaya were authorized in Spain's 1887 naval program. Inspired by the British Orlando-class armored cruisers, they were built to a design drawn up by Palmers Shipbuilding and Iron Company of Jarrow, England. They had two funnels and were fast and well armed. Their main armament was mounted on the center line in single barbettes fore and aft. Their armor was poor: their 11-inch (279 mm) guns had only lightly armored hoods, their 140-millimetre (5.5 in) guns were mounted in the open on the upper deck, their armor belt was thin and protected only two-thirds of their length, and they had a high, unprotected freeboard that took much damage during the Battle of Santiago de Cuba; one source suggests that despite their classification as armored cruisers, their lack of protection made them more akin to fast, heavily armed protected cruisers than to true armored cruisers. Like other 19th-century warships, they were heavily furnished and decorated with wood, which the Spanish failed to remove prior to combat and which fed fires during the battle.

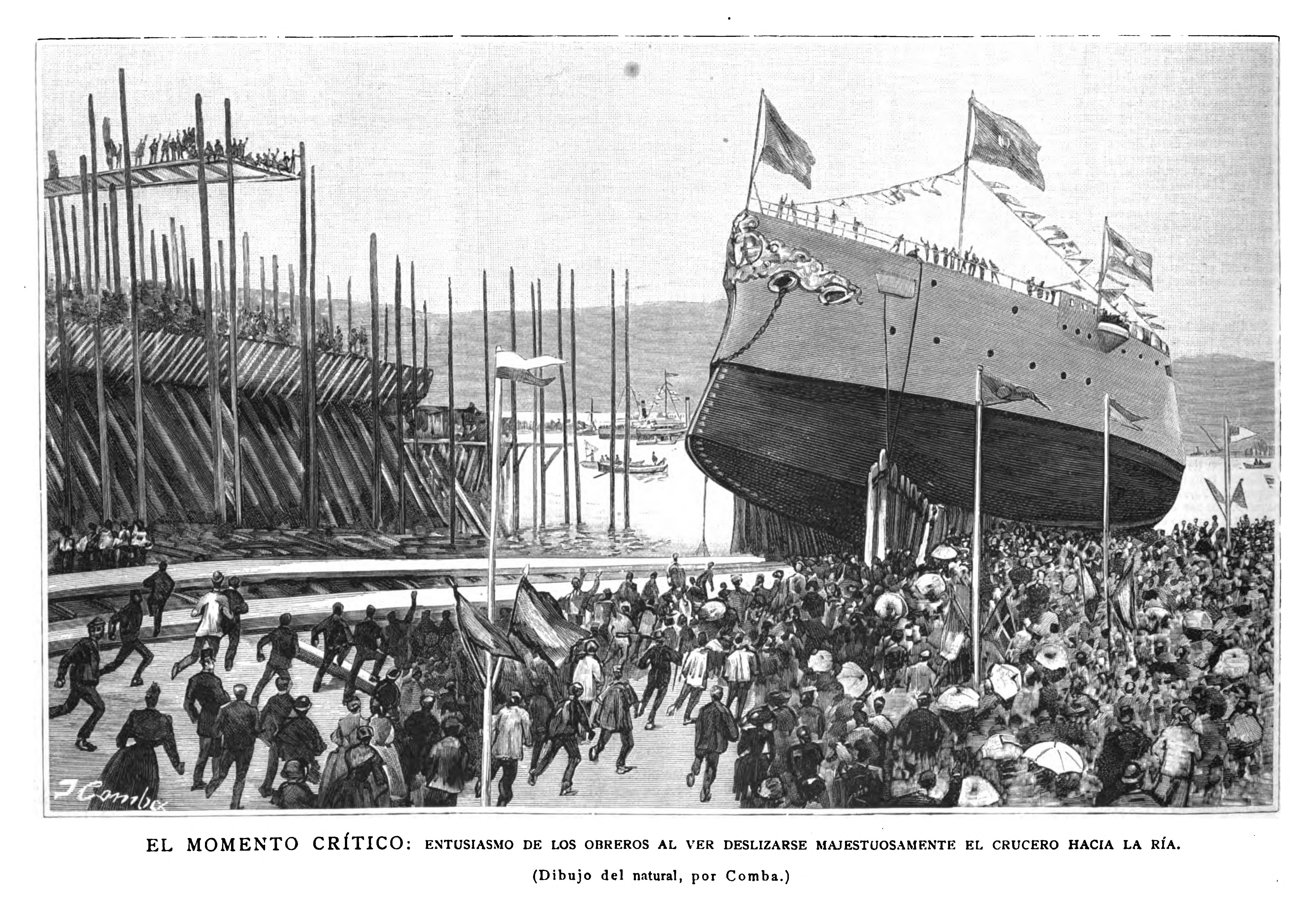
The launching of Infanta Maria Teresa at Sestao, Spain, on 30 August 1890

Infanta Maria Teresa, Almirante Oquendo, and Vizcaya were built by Sociedad Astilleros del Nervión ("Nervión Shipyards") at Sestao, Spain. Infanta Maria Teresa was laid down on 24 July 1889 and launched on 30 August 1890 in a ceremony presided over by Maria Christina, Queen Regent of Spain, and was completed in 1893. While she was fitting out, the shipyard began to experience increasing financial problems during 1891, and these brought the construction of all three cruisers to a standstill in April 1892, prompting the Spanish government to intervene and appoint Capitán de navío (Ship-of-the-line captain) Pascual Cervera y Topete to serve as director of the shipyard. It was decided to move the three incomplete ships to Ferrol to complete fitting-out. Infanta Maria Teresa departed Sestao at 14:00 on 1 September 1893 and arrived at Ferrol on the morning of 2 September 1893, maintaining a constant speed of 11 knots (13 mph; 20 km/h) during the voyage with six boilers lit. She conducted official speed trials off Galicia on 18 September 1893, during which she was expected to reach 19 knots (22 mph; 35 km/h) at natural draft and 21 knots (24 mph; 39 km/h) at forced draft. She was delivered to the Spanish Navy in 1893. The construction delays caused the cost of each cruiser, set at 15 million pesetas when they were ordered, to rise to about 20 million pesetas each by the time of their completion.

== Operational history ==
=== 1893–1898 ===
Assigned to the Training Squadron, Infanta Maria Teresa served as the flagship of a representative squadron – which also included the battleship Pelayo and the protected cruiser Marqués de la Ensenada— under the overall command of Contraalmirante (Counter admiral) Fernando Martínez de Espinosa y Echeverri sent to represent Spain at the opening of the German Empire′s Kiel Canal, which linked the North Sea with the Baltic Sea. The ships departed Cartagena, Spain, at the end of May 1895 and arrived in Germany in early June. During the ceremonies, Infanta Maria Teresa became the first Spanish ship to transit the new canal. In January 1896, when Contraalmirante (Counter Admiral) José Reguera y González Polo took command of the Training Squadron, it consisted of Pelayo, Almirante Oquendo, Infanta Maria Teresa, and Vizcaya.

c. 1897 painting of Infanta Maria Teresa

To represent Spain at ceremonies in the United States recognizing what would have been the 75th birthday of the late President Ulysses S. Grant and celebrating the opening of Grant's Tomb in New York City, Infanta Maria Teresa got underway from Mahón on Menorca in the Balearic Islands on 3 April 1897 in company with the unprotected cruiser Infanta Isabel and proceeded to New York, which the two ships reached on the day of the tomb's dedication, 27 April 1897. After completing their participation in the planned events, the two cruisers departed New York on 11 May 1897. They arrived at Mahón at the end of June 1897 and rejoined their squadron.

During the first half of August 1897, Infanta Maria Teresa, Almirante Oquendo, Vizcaya, and the torpedo gunboat Destructor visited the Arsenal de Ferrol to have their bottoms cleaned and painted. After loading coal, they departed Ferrol in mid-August for duty with the Training Squadron, by then under the overall command of Contraalmirante (Counter Admiral) Segismundo Bermejo y Merelo, and proceeded to Cádiz, Spain, where the new armored cruiser Cristóbal Colón joined them. The ships subsequently made a cruise along the coast of Galicia before arriving at Lisbon, Portugal, on 23 September 1897. They then headed for Cádiz, which they reached in October 1897. Bermejo then relinquished command of the Training Squadron to take office as Minister of the Navy.

On 30 October 1897, Pascual Cervera y Topete, now a contraalmirante (counter admiral) and former Minister of the Navy, took charge of the Training Squadron. On 27 November 1897, the squadron – composed of Vizcaya (serving as Cervera's flagship), Almirante Oquendo, Infanta María Teresa, and Cristóbal Colón — got underway from Cádiz and began maneuvers focused on crew training and gunnery practice during a voyage to Levante. Destructor and the destroyers Furor and Terror remained behind in Cádiz until their bottoms were cleaned, but later joined the squadron at Santa Pola, as did the torpedo boats Ariete, Azor, and Rayo from Cartagena. Once all six of the smaller warships had rendezvoused with the cruisers, several exercises took place highlighting simulated night attacks against the other ships by the torpedo boats. The Ministry of the Navy recommended that Cervera keep the maneuvers to a minimum to "save fuel and projectiles," restricting the large-caliber guns of Cervera's cruisers to firing only two rounds each. Nonetheless, Cervera saw enough by the time the maneuvers ended on 22 December 1897 to conclude that his ships, and particularly their gunnery, were in a poor state of readiness for combat. After the maneuvers concluded, the Training Squadron anchored at Alicante on 23 December 1897, and a few days later it arrived at Cartagena.

On 26 January 1898 the Ministry of the Navy ordered Cervera to transfer his flag from Vizcaya to Infanta María Teresa and directed Vizcaya to make a goodwill visit to New York City in return for a goodwill visit the United States Navy armored cruiser USS Maine, often referred to as a "battleship," had begun at Havana in the Captaincy General of Cuba the previous day. Vizcaya got underway from Cartagena hastily on 31 January. Almirante Oquendo also soon departed to visit Havana, and Cristóbal Colón, still lacking her main guns, left for Genoa, Italy, to have them installed, leaving Cervera with only Infanta Maria Teresa and the protected cruiser Lepanto under his direct command.

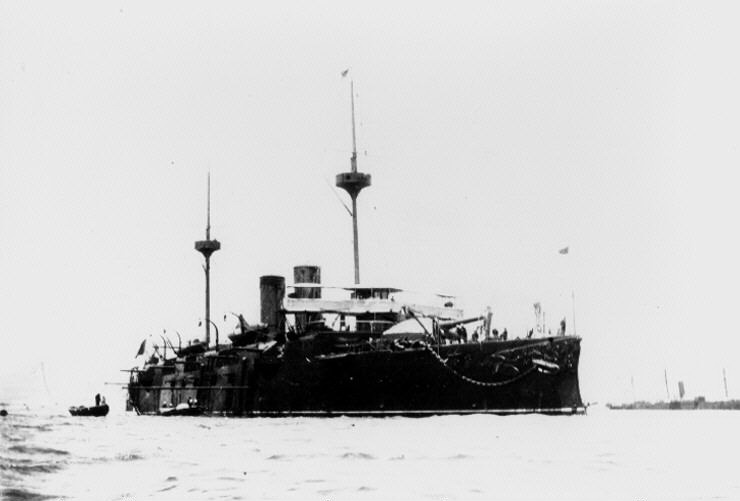
Infanta Maria Teresa at São Vicente in the Cape Verde Islands sometime between 14 and 29 April 1898

Maine blew up and sank in Havana Harbor on 15 February 1898; Spanish authorities concluded that Maine had suffered an accidental internal explosion, but the Americans claimed that a Spanish mine or torpedo had sunk Maine. With relations between Spain and the United States deteriorating rapidly, Cervera's squadron was redesignated the 1st Squadron, and its ships received orders to concentrate at São Vicente in Portugal's Cape Verde Islands. After plans to install her main guns were cancelled, Cristóbal Colón rendezvoused with Infanta Maria Teresa at Cádiz. The two armored cruisers departed Cádiz in company with three destroyers on 8 April 1898 and reached São Vicente on 14 April. Infanta Maria Teresa experienced machinery problems and burned excessive amounts of coal during the voyage, and after arriving at São Vicente her crew discovered that her 140-millimetre (5.5 in) guns had defective breech mechanisms and had been supplied with defective ammunition. As more ships, including Almirante Oquendo and Vizcaya, arrived over the next few days, the squadron found that it had a shortage of stokers.

=== Spanish-American War ===
The Spanish–American War broke out while Infanta María Teresa was at São Vicente when the United States declared war on Spain on 25 April 1898, stipulating that its declaration was retroactive to 21 April. Ordered by neutral Portugal in accordance with international law to leave São Vicente within 24 hours of the declaration of war, Infanta María Teresa and the rest of Cervera's squadron departed on 29 April 1898, bound for San Juan, Puerto Rico. The squadron reached French-owned Martinique in the Lesser Antilles on 10 May 1898. While the large ships loitered in international waters, two of the Spanish destroyers went into Fort-de-France to ask for coal. France was neutral and would not supply coal, so the Spanish squadron departed on 12 May 1898 for the Netherlands-owned Curaçao, where Cervera expected to meet a collier. Cervera arrived at Willemstad on 14 May, but the Netherlands also was neutral, and strictly enforced its neutrality by allowing only Infanta María Teresa and her sister ship Vizcaya to enter port and permitting them to load only 600 tons of coal. Cervera's ships departed on 15 May, no longer bound for San Juan, which by now was under a United States Navy blockade, but for as-yet unblockaded Santiago de Cuba on the southeastern coast of Cuba, arriving there on 19 May 1898. Cervera hoped to refit his ships there before he could be trapped. His squadron was still in the harbor of Santiago de Cuba when the U.S. Navy's Flying Squadron arrived on 27 May 1898 and began a blockade – reinforced by the arrival of the U.S. Navy's North Atlantic Squadron on 1 June— which would drag on for 37 days.

The blockade wore on, with Infanta María Teresa and the others enduring occasional American naval bombardments of the harbor. Infanta María Teresa′s crew determined that 80 percent of the ammunition for her 140-millimetre (5.5 in) guns was defective. Some of her crewmen joined others from the fleet in a Naval Brigade to fight against a United States Army overland drive toward Santiago de Cuba.

By the beginning of July 1898, the U.S. thrust threatened to capture Santiago de Cuba, and Cervera decided that his squadron's only hope was to escape into the open sea by running the blockade. The decision was made on 1 July 1898, with the break-out set for 3 July 1898. The crew of Infanta María Teresa spent 2 July 1898 returning from Naval Brigade service ashore and preparing for action. With Vice Admiral Cervera aboard, Infanta María Teresa was to lead the escape, sacrificing herself by attacking the fastest American ship, the armored cruiser USS Brooklyn, in the hope that this would allow the rest of the squadron to avoid action and run westward for the open sea.

The Spanish ships got underway at 08:45 on 3 July 1898. The U.S. ships sighted the Spanish ships in the channel at about 09:35, and the Battle of Santiago de Cuba began. As lead ship in the Spanish line, Infanta María Teresa was the first ship to receive concentrated fire from the blockading U.S. Navy squadron. With Vizcaya close behind her and the other Spanish ships turning hard to starboard to flee to the west, Infanta María Teresa charged Brooklyn as if to ram, closing the range to 600 yards (550 m) by 10:05, forcing Brooklyn to turn to the east. Infanta María Teresa turned west, brushing past the last obstacle in her path, the armed yacht USS Vixen, as the battleship USS Iowa came up at a range of 2,600 yards (2,400 m) to port, with the battleships USS Oregon and USS Indiana close behind Iowa. A general engagement ensued, with the U.S. ships to starboard of Infanta María Teresa and both sides firing at maximum rates.

One of the first shells Iowa fired hit the after main-battery turret of Infanta María Teresa, killing or wounding its crew and knocking out its gun. Infanta María Teresa had already taken many hits, and now Brooklyn and the battleship USS Texas began to hit her repeatedly. Fires broke out, threatening to detonate her ammunition magazines. Seeing no hope for the ship and wishing to save as many of her crew as possible, Cervera at 10:20 ordered the ship beached. With her upper works swept by small arms fire and her decks ravaged by fire, she turned to starboard and ran aground at 10:25 in a small cove about 6 miles (9.7 km) west of Santiago de Cuba and just west of Punta Cabrera, coming to rest upright with her stern over deep water and her bottom pierced by rocks, one of which created a 26-inch (66 cm) hole. She struck her colors and her crew flooded her magazines to prevent them from exploding. Some of her crewmen made it ashore, although they had to beware of Cuban insurgents, who began to shoot the survivors of the wrecked Spanish ships. Others were rescued by American sailors who brought small boats alongside the wreck to take off survivors.

The battle ended in the destruction of all of Cervera's ships, and the four cruisers beached at various points along the southern coast of Cuba. The war ended on 13 August 1898.

== Salvage and loss ==
The wreck of Infanta Maria Teresa aground on the south coast of Cuba after the Battle of Santiago de Cuba

On 6 July 1898, the commander of the U.S. Navy's North Atlantic Squadron, Rear Admiral William T. Sampson, appointed a board chaired by Commodore John C. Watson to survey the damage to the Spanish ships lost in the Battle of Santiago de Cuba. Watson's assistant Naval Constructor Richmond Pearson Hobson became supervisor of wrecks and convinced President William McKinley to support salvage operations in Cuba, after which the U.S. Navy hired the Merritt & Chapman Derrick and Wrecking Company to do most of the salvage work.

Surveys of the Spanish wrecks concluded that Infanta Maria Teresa — which the Americans referred to simply as "Teresa" — was the least damaged of the Spanish ships sunk in the Battle of Santiago de Cuba and the only one that could be salvaged. She was pulled gently off the beach and refloated on 24 September 1898 and the tug USS Potomac towed her to Guantánamo Bay, Cuba, for preliminary repairs. With these completed, the U.S. Navy repair ship USS Vulcan and the Merritt & Chapman Derrick and Wrecking Company salvage vessel Merritt took Infanta Maria Teresa under tow and departed Guantánamo Bay in company with the collier Leonidas on 29 October 1898 headed for Norfolk, Virginia, where permanent repairs could be made. Merritt, Vulcan, and Infanta Maria Teresa formed a tow stretching for nearly 1,000 yards (910 m), with Merritt leading and attached to Vulcan by a 400-yard (370 m) manila line and Vulcan in turn attached to Infanta Maria Teresa by a 460-yard (420 m) 15-inch (38 cm) manila chain. Good weather allowed the ships to make 6 knots (6.9 mph; 11 km/h) as they headed eastward into the Windward Passage between Cuba and Haiti, with Infanta Maria Teresa assisting the tow by operating one of her steam engines.

Good weather persisted on 30 October, and the ships rounded the northeastern tip of Cuba before 12:00 that day and headed toward the Bahamas. At around 20:00 that evening, however, the weather became unsettled, and it remained cloudy and squally on 31 October. On the morning of 1 November 1898, the three ships were in Crooked Island Passage in the Bahamas when a violent squall struck. The weather continued to deteriorate in the hours that followed as a tropical storm passed through the area. The tow's speed dropped to 2 knots (3.7 km/h; 2.3 mph), and Infanta Maria Teresa began to roll heavily and was down by the bow, with the pumps unable to keep up with the ingress of water. By 13:30, the 114 men aboard her were abandoning ship, and a surfboat from Merritt rescued the last of them at 16:54. At 17:11 Vulcan cut the tow line, and Leonidas, Merritt, and Vulcan hove to while the abandoned Infanta Maria Teresa drifted out of sight. Merritt parted company with the other two ships at 19:00, presumably to transport Infanta Maria Teresa′s crew to either Nassau in the Bahamas or Key West, Florida. In the intensifying storm, Vulcan and Leonidas got back underway and zigzaged back down Crooked Island Passage to search for Infanta Maria Teresa but found no trace of her. Presuming she had sunk, they gave up the search at 09:00 on 2 November 1898 and set course for Norfolk.

Infanta Maria Teresa in fact had remained afloat and drifted for 55 nautical miles (102 km; 63 mi) until running aground, apparently with great force, between two coral reefs off Cat Island in the Bahamas less than 1 nautical mile (1.9 km; 1.2 mi) south of Bird Point. Potomac and Vulcan rendezvoused off Bird Point on 3 November 1898 to begin a survey of the wreck. Infanta Maria Teresa′s bow pointed to the northwest, and both her anchors had been thrown off the bow, apparently by the force of her impact. The ocean washed over her at high tide, and her bottom had been crushed, with hull plating rivets shorn off and the hull's integrity destroyed. Deeming her beyond salvage, the U.S. Navy officially abandoned her wreck on 20 November 1898.

== Rediscovery of wreck ==
The U.S. Navy retained few records of Infanta Maria Teresa, which it had never commissioned into service, and over time her wreck was largely forgotten, even locally in the Bahamas. In December 1999, however, a pilot who had been informed of the wreck's existence flew over the waters off Bird Point at an altitude of 300 feet (91 m) and spotted the outline of the submerged wreck. Three days later, scuba divers followed up by diving on the wreck site, finding the wreck surprisingly intact, with a clearly discernible bow and stern, and identifying three large guns, one of which was 21 feet (6.4 m) long and of 11-inch (279 mm) caliber.

== Commemoration ==
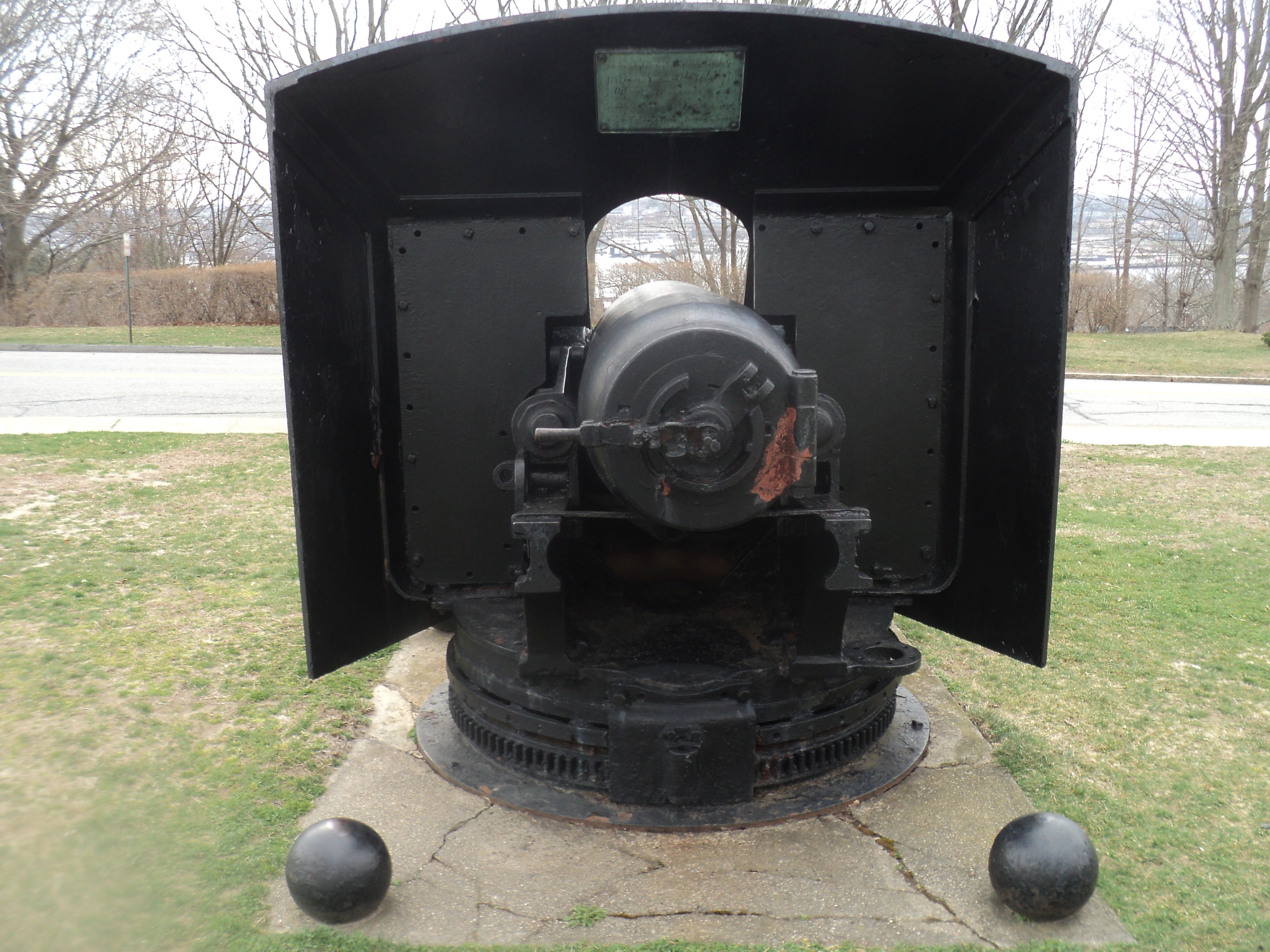
A 140 mm (5.5 in) gun salvaged from Infanta Maria Teresa at Fort Griswold Battlefield State Park in Groton, Connecticut

The United States Navy salvaged several guns from Infanta Maria Teresa′s wreck. One 140-millimeter (5.5 in) gun is on display at Fort Griswold Battlefield State Park in Groton, Connecticut. Another 140-millimeter (5.5 in) gun, with battle damage, is on display at Veterans Memorial Park in Ottumwa, Iowa, and bears a commemorative plaque which reads, "This Cannon was taken from the battleship [sic] The Maria Theresa, flag ship of admiral Cervera's fleet in the war with Spain in 1898. Plaque donated by Jo Hayes Camp, Spanish War Veterans of Ottumwa." A third 140-millimeter (5.5 in) gun is on prominent display at the Minneapolis Veterans Home, a long-term care facility in Minneapolis, Minnesota, operated by the Minnesota Department of Veterans Affairs.

The Government of Cuba created Cuba's first underwater national monument, the Archaeological Park of the Natural and Cultural Underwater Heritage Battle of Santiago de Cuba, in 2015 along an approximately 120-kilometre (75 mi) stretch of Cuba's southern coast to preserve the wrecks of the ships remaining there and pay tribute to sailors who died in the Battle of Santiago de Cuba. Wreck diving is permitted in the park.
