= Spanish cruiser Vizcaya =

Spanish armored cruiser of 1894–1898

Coordinates: 19°58′N 76°8′W

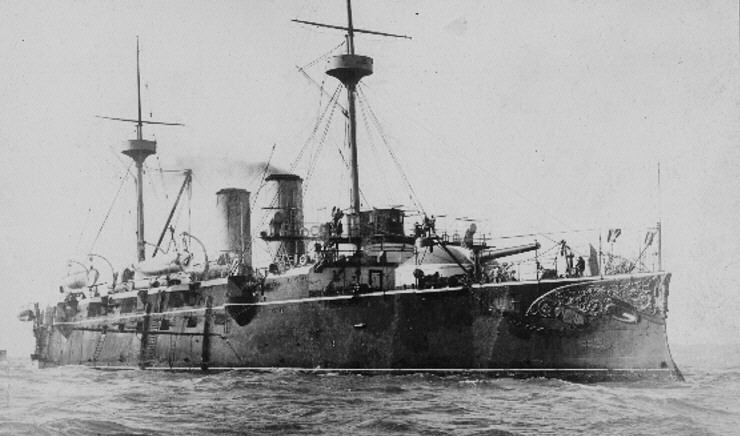
- Vizcaya sometime between 1893 and 1898

History

Spain
- Name: Vizcaya
- Namesake: Biscay, a Spanish province.
- Builder: Sociedad Astilleros del Nervión, Sestao, Spain
- Cost: ca. 20,000,000 pesetas
- Laid down: 7 October 1889
- Launched: 8 July 1891
- Fate: Sunk 3 July 1898

General characteristics
- Class & type: Infanta Maria Teresa-class armored cruiser
- Displacement: 6,890 tons
- Length: 364 ft 0 in (110.95 m)
- Beam: 65 ft 2 in (19.86 m)
- Draft: 21 ft 6 in (6.55 m) maximum
- Installed power: 13,700 ihp (10,200 kW)
- Propulsion: 2-shaft vertical triple expansion
- Speed: 20.2 kn (37.4 km/h; 23.2 mph) (forced draft)
- Endurance: 1,050 tons of coal (normal)
- Complement: 484 officers and enlisted men
- Armament: 2 × 28 cm (11.0 in)/35 guns; 10 × 14 cm (5.5 in)/35 guns; 8 × 12 pdr quick-firing guns; 10 × 3 pdr Hotchkiss revolvers; 8 × Nordenfeld machine guns, 2 × Maxim machine guns; 8 × torpedo tubes (2 submerged)
- Armor: Belt: 12–10 in (305–254 mm); Barbettes: 9 in (229 mm); Conning tower: 12 in (305 mm); Deck: 2–3 in (51–76 mm)

Vizcaya was an Infanta Maria Teresa-class armored cruiser of the Spanish Navy. Launched in 1891, she was sunk on 3 July 1898 at the Battle of Santiago de Cuba during the Spanish–American War.

== Construction and characteristics ==
Profile of Vizcaya with her appearance in 1898

Vizcaya (left) in the Cartagena Iron Drydock in 1896

Vizcaya and her sister ships Almirante Oquendo and Infanta Maria Teresa were authorized in Spain's 1887 naval program. Inspired by the British Orlando-class armored cruisers, they were built to a design drawn up by Palmers Shipbuilding and Iron Company of Jarrow, England. They had two funnels and were fast and well armed. Their main armament was mounted on the center line in single barbettes fore and aft. Their armor was poor: their 11-inch (279 mm) guns had only lightly armored hoods, their 140-millimetre (5.5 in) guns were mounted in the open on the upper deck, their armor belt was thin and protected only two-thirds of their length, and they had a high, unprotected freeboard that took much damage during the Battle of Santiago de Cuba; one source suggests that despite their classification as armored cruisers, their lack of protection made them more akin to fast, heavily armed protected cruisers than to true armored cruisers. Like other 19th-century warships, they were heavily furnished and decorated with wood, which the Spanish failed to remove prior to combat and which fed fires during the battle.

Vizcaya, Almirante Oquendo, and Infanta Maria Teresa were built by Sociedad Astilleros del Nervión ("Nervión Shipyards") at Sestao, Spain. Vizcaya was laid down on 7 October 1889, and launched on 8 July 1891. While she was fitting out, financial problems at the shipyard brought the construction of all three cruisers to a standstill in April 1892, prompting the Spanish government to intervene and appoint Capitán de navío (Ship-of-the-line captain) Pascual Cervera y Topete to serve as director of the shipyard. The Spanish Navy decided to move the three incomplete ships to Ferrol to complete fitting-out. Vizcaya left Sestao on 2 August 1894. The construction delays caused the cost of each cruiser, set at 15 million pesetas when they were ordered, to rise to about 20 million pesetas each by the time of their completion.

== Operational history ==
=== 1894–1898 ===
c. 1897 painting of Vizcaya

After her completion and delivery to the Spanish Navy, Vizcaya made a transatlantic voyage to the Antilles. After returning to Spain, she arrived at Tangier as part of the Training Squadron — which also included the battleship Pelayo and the protected cruisers Alfonso XIII and Marqués de la Ensenada — on 12 June 1895 to put put pressure on Sultan Abdelaziz of Morocco after a series of incidents there, joining three Imperial German Navy and six British Royal Navy warships anchored at Tangier. After the situation in Morocco calmed down, the Spanish ships returned to Spain, arriving at Algeciras on 17 August 1895.

Vizcaya continued her assignment to the Training Squadron during 1896 and was anchored at Barcelona from 17 June to 19 July 1896. On 23 February 1897 she suffered hull damage when the mail steamer Menorquín collided with her at Mahón. Vizcaya underwent repairs at Mahón.

Selected to represent the Spanish Navy at a naval review at Spithead in honor of the Diamond Jubilee of Queen Victoria, celebrating the 60th anniversary of her coronation, Vizcaya got underway from Cádiz at 06:00 on 12 June 1897 as the flagship of Counter-admiral Segismundo Bermejo y Merelo, the Training Squadron's commander. In England, she received a representative of the Spanish colony in England on board and took part in the review on 26 June before returning to Spain at Ferrol at the beginning of July 1897.

During the first half of August 1897, Vizcaya, Almirante Oquendo, Infanta Maria Teresa, and the torpedo gunboat Destructor visited the Arsenal de Ferrol to have their bottoms cleaned and painted. After loading coal, they departed Ferrol in mid-August for duty with the Training Squadron and proceeded to Cádiz, where the new armored cruiser Cristóbal Colón joined them. The ships subsequently made a cruise along the coast of Galicia before arriving at Lisbon, Portugal, on 23 September 1897. They then headed for Cádiz, which they reached in October 1897. Bermejo then relinquished command of the Training Squadron to take office as Minister of the Navy.

On 30 October 1897 Counter-admiral Pascual Cervera y Topete, a former Minister of the Navy, took charge of the Training Squadron. On 27 November 1897, the squadron – composed of Vizcaya (serving as Cervera's flagship), Almirante Oquendo, Infanta María Teresa, and Cristóbal Colón — got underway from Cádiz and began maneuvers focused on crew training and gunnery practice during a voyage to Levante. Destructor and the destroyers Furor and Terror remained behind in Cadiz until their bottoms were cleaned, but later joined the squadron at Santa Pola, as did the torpedo boats Ariete, Azor, and Rayo from Cartagena. Once all six of the smaller warships had rendezvoused with the cruisers, several exercises took place highlighting simulated night attacks against the other ships by the torpedo boats. The Ministry of the Navy recommended that Cervera keep the maneuvers to a minimum to "save fuel and projectiles," restricting the large-caliber guns of Cervera's cruisers to firing only two rounds each. Nonetheless, Cervera saw enough by the time the maneuvers ended on 22 December 1897 to conclude that his ships, and particularly their gunnery, were in a poor state of readiness for combat. After the maneuvers concluded, the Training Squadron anchored at Alicante on 23 December 1897, and a few days later it arrived at Cartagena.

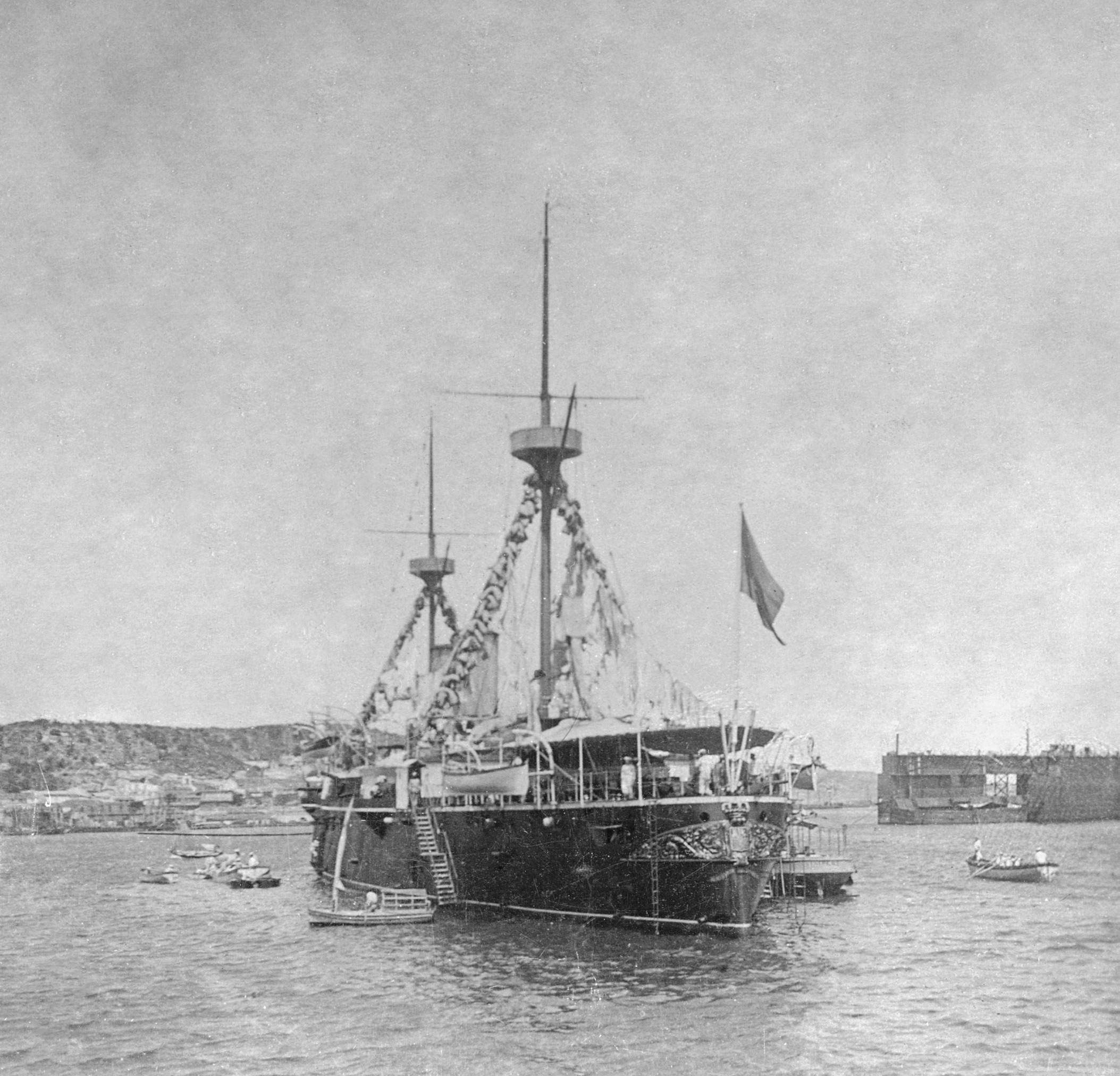
Vizcaya in c. 1898

On 26 January 1898 the Ministry of the Navy ordered Cervera to transfer his flag from Vizcaya to Infanta María Teresa and directed Vizcaya to make a goodwill visit to New York City in return for a goodwill visit the United States Navy armored cruiser USS Maine, often referred to as a "battleship," had begun at Havana in the Captaincy General of Cuba the previous day. On 31 January, Vizcaya got underway hastily from Cartagena bound for New York without first having her bottom cleaned and without loading enough coal for the voyage. During her voyage, Maine blew up and sank in Havana Harbor on 15 February 1898; Spanish authorities concluded that Maine had suffered an accidental internal explosion, but the Americans claimed that a Spanish mine or torpedo had sunk the ship. Vizcaya arrived at New York on 19 February 1898 and anchored at Staten Island. With relations between Spain and the United States deteriorating rapidly, she found herself in a hostile environment and her crew kept arms ready to defend themselves in case of any American reprisals. On 25 February she departed New York for Havana, where she rendezvoused with Almirante Oquendo. The two cruisers then steamed back across the Atlantic Ocean to rejoin Cervera's squadron, now designated the 1st Squadron, which was concentrating at São Vicente in Portugal's Cape Verde Islands. They arrived at São Vicente on 19 April 1898. After her arrival, the 1st Squadron noted that Vizcaya badly needed drydocking because of a badly fouled bottom and that her 140-millimetre (5.5 in) guns had defective breech mechanisms and had been supplied with defective ammunition. Moreover, the squadron had a shortage of stokers.

=== Spanish-American War ===
The Spanish–American War began while Vizcaya was at São Vicente, when the United States declared war on Spain on 25 April 1898, stipulating that its declaration was retroactive to 21 April. Ordered by neutral Portugal in accordance with international law to leave São Vicente within 24 hours of the declaration of war, Vizcaya and the rest of Cervera's squadron departed on 29 April 1898, bound for San Juan, Puerto Rico. Cervera's ships reached French-owned Martinique in the Lesser Antilles on 10 May 1898. While Vizcaya and the other large ships loitered in international waters, two Spanish destroyers went into Fort-de-France to ask for coal. France was neutral and would not supply coal, so the Spanish squadron departed on 12 May 1898 for Dutch-owned Curaçao, where Cervera expected to meet a collier. Cervera arrived at Willemstad on 14 May, but the Netherlands also was neutral, and strictly enforced its neutrality by allowing only Vizcaya and her sister ship Infanta Maria Teresa to enter port and permitting them to load only 600 tons of coal. On 15 May, Cervera's ships departed, no longer bound for San Juan, which by now was under a U.S. Navy blockade, but for as-yet unblockaded Santiago de Cuba on the southeastern coast of Cuba, arriving there on 19 May 1898. Cervera hoped to refit his ships there before he could be trapped. His squadron was still in the harbor of Santiago de Cuba when the U.S. Navy's Flying Squadron arrived on 27 May 1898 and began a blockade – reinforced by the arrival of the U.S. Navy's North Atlantic Squadron on 1 June— which would drag on for 37 days.

Some action occurred during the blockade. On 3 June 1898, the U.S. Navy steamed the collier USS Merrimac into the entrance channel to the harbor, hoping to scuttle her so as to block the channel and trap the Spanish ships inside. Spanish shore batteries already had disabled Merrimac when she drifted up the channel to a point where the Spanish ships could fire on her as well. Vizcaya, the unprotected cruiser Reina Mercedes, and the destroyer Pluton all opened fire, and Merrimac quickly sank in a position that did not block the entrance. Vizcaya hit the bridge of Merrimac with several 5.5-inch rounds.

The blockade wore on, with Vizcaya and the others enduring occasional American naval bombardments of the harbor. Vizcaya still had two 140-millimetre (5.5 in) guns out of commission, 80 percent of the 140-millimetre ammunition was defective, and nothing could be done under the circumstances about her terribly fouled bottom. Some of her men joined others from the fleet in a Naval Brigade to fight ashore against a United States Army overland drive toward Santiago de Cuba.

Vizcaya exploding

Vizcaya's wreck after the Battle of Santiago de Cuba

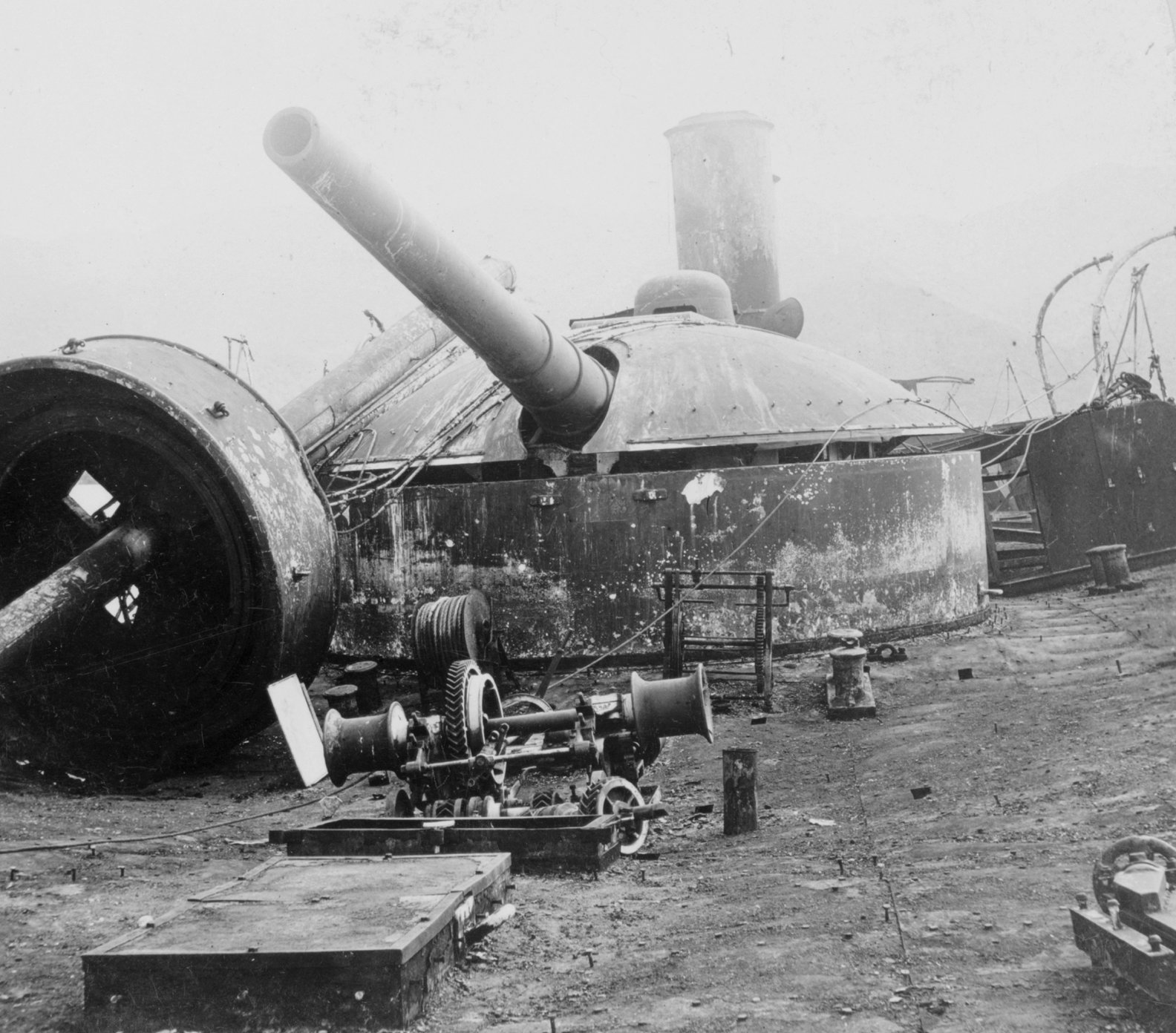
One of Vizcaya′s 11-inch gun turrets aboard her wreck

By the beginning of July 1898, that drive threatened to capture Santiago de Cuba, and Cervera decided that his squadron's only hope was to try to escape into the open sea by running the blockade. The decision was made on 1 July 1898, with the break-out set for 3 July 1898. The crew of Vizcaya spent 2 July 1898 returning from Naval Brigade service and preparing for action. Vizcaya was to be the second ship in line during the escape, following Cervera's flagship Infanta Maria Teresa; while Infanta Maria Teresa was sacrificed by attacking the fastest American ship, the armored cruiser USS Brooklyn, Vizcaya and the others were to put on all the speed they could and run westward for the open sea.

At about 0845 hours on 3 July 1898, the Spanish ships got underway. The U.S. squadron sighted the Spanish ships in the channel at about 0935, and the Battle of Santiago de Cuba began.

While their squadron mates turned to starboard and put on steam for a run to the west behind them, Vizcaya followed Infanta Maria Teresa closely as she charged Brooklyn as if to ram. When Brooklyn turned away to the east, Vizcaya and Infanta Maria Teresa turned west, brushing past the last obstacle in their path, the armed yacht USS Vixen.

Vizcaya now found herself back in the line-ahead formation the squadron had formed when it left its anchorage, in second place behind Infanta Maria Teresa and ahead of armored cruiser Cristóbal Colón and Almirante Oquendo. At 1035, the sinking Infanta Maria Teresa was driven ashore with heavy damage and fires, and Almirante Oquendo soon suffered the same fate, running aground nearly abreast of Vizcaya. Further inshore, the two Spanish destroyers also succumbed. By 1050, Vizcaya and Cristóbal Colón were the only Spanish ships left.

Brooklyn now focused on Vizcaya, closing to a range of 950 yards (870 m) and pounding Vizcaya with numerous 8-inch (203 mm) and 5-inch (127 mm) shell hits, while battleships USS Texas, Iowa, Oregon, and Indiana also scored hits. Vizcaya managed to score two 5.5-inch hits on Brooklyn, killing the lone American sailor who died in the battle. But at about 1100, Brooklyn scored two 8-inch hits on Vizcaya; one detonated a torpedo in her forward tube and blew a large part of her bow off, and the other knocked down her bridge and set her decorative woodwork and wooden furnishings on fire. When the fire began to cause ready ammunition for the secondary battery to explode, the end was clearly at hand for Vizcaya. At 1106, she turned toward the shore, struck her battle ensign, and ran herself up on the beach.

Some of her sailors made it ashore, although they had to beware of Cuban insurgents, who began to shoot the survivors of the wrecked Spanish ships. Others were rescued by American sailors who brought small boats alongside the wrecks to take off survivors. One of those rescued was the commanding officer of Vizcaya, Captain Don Antonio Eulate, who, when brought aboard Iowa, looked at the burning wreck of his ship, raised his hand in salute, and called out "Adios, Vizcaya!" Immediately, as if on cue, the cruiser's forward magazines exploded.

Postwar, a U.S. Navy survey team evaluating Spanish wrecks for their potential for being raised and put in American service concluded that Vizcaya was beyond salvage.

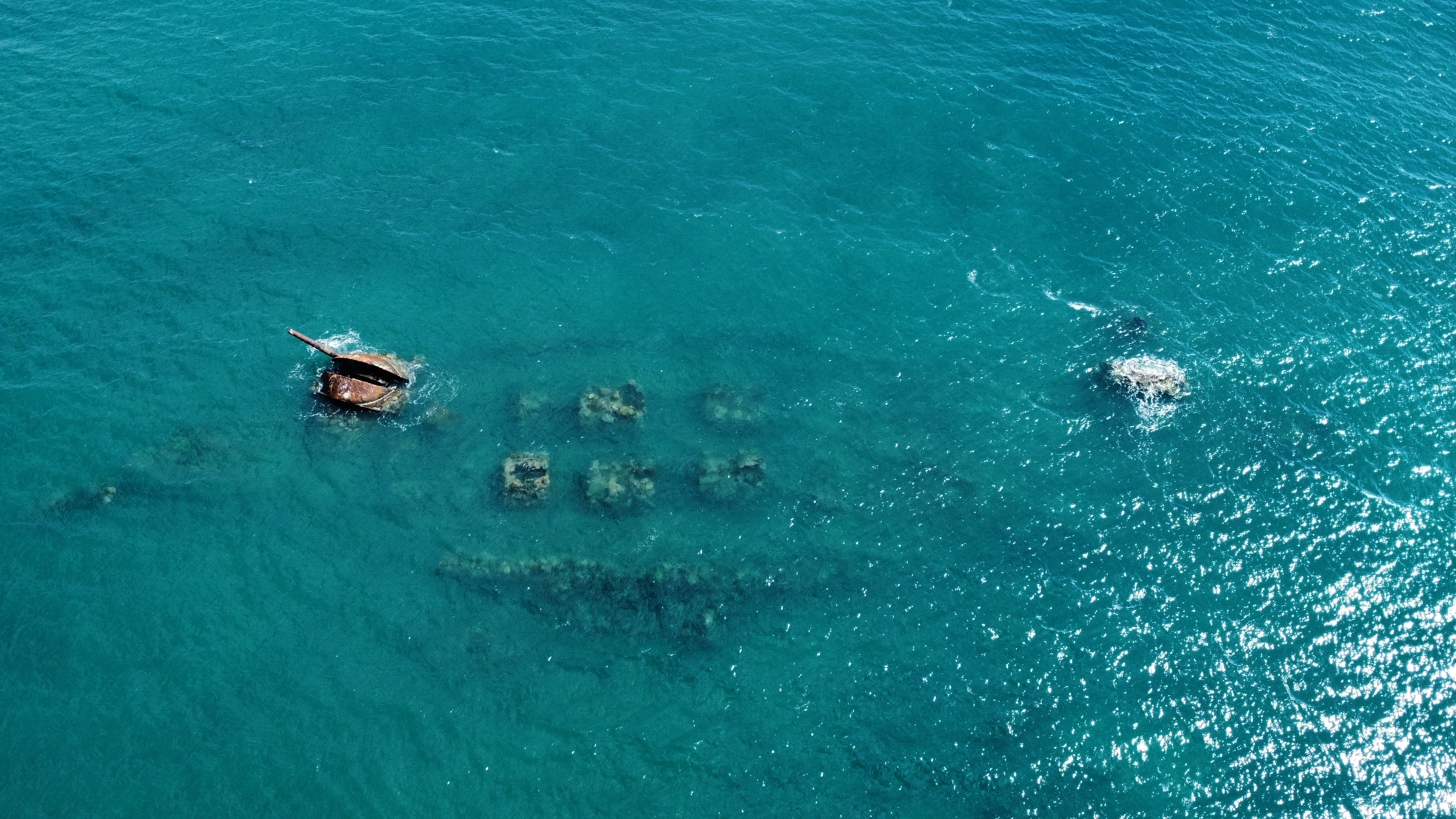
An aerial view of the wreck of Vizcaya on 22 November 2022.

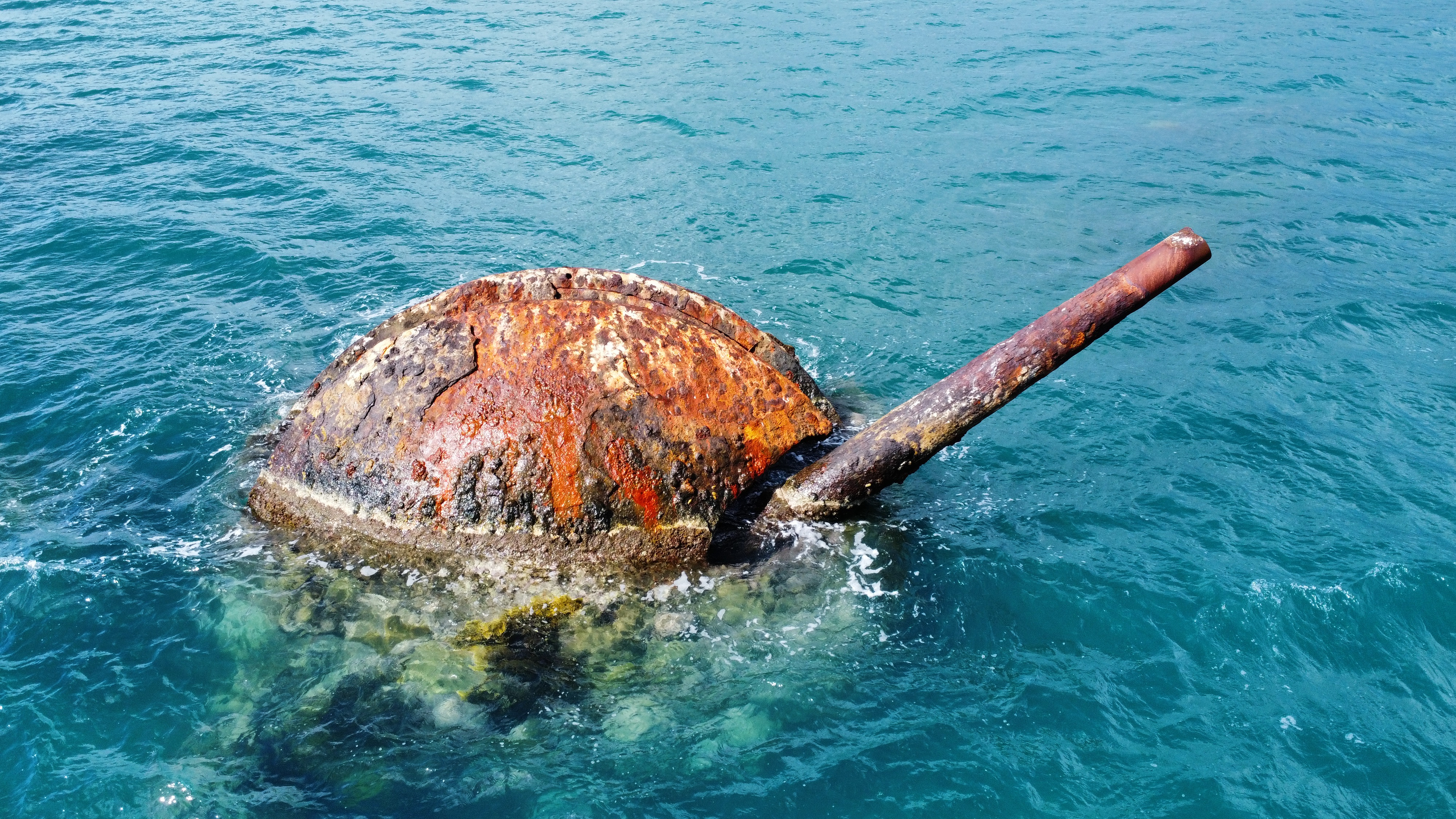
A gun turret of the wreck of Vizcaya on 22 November 2022.

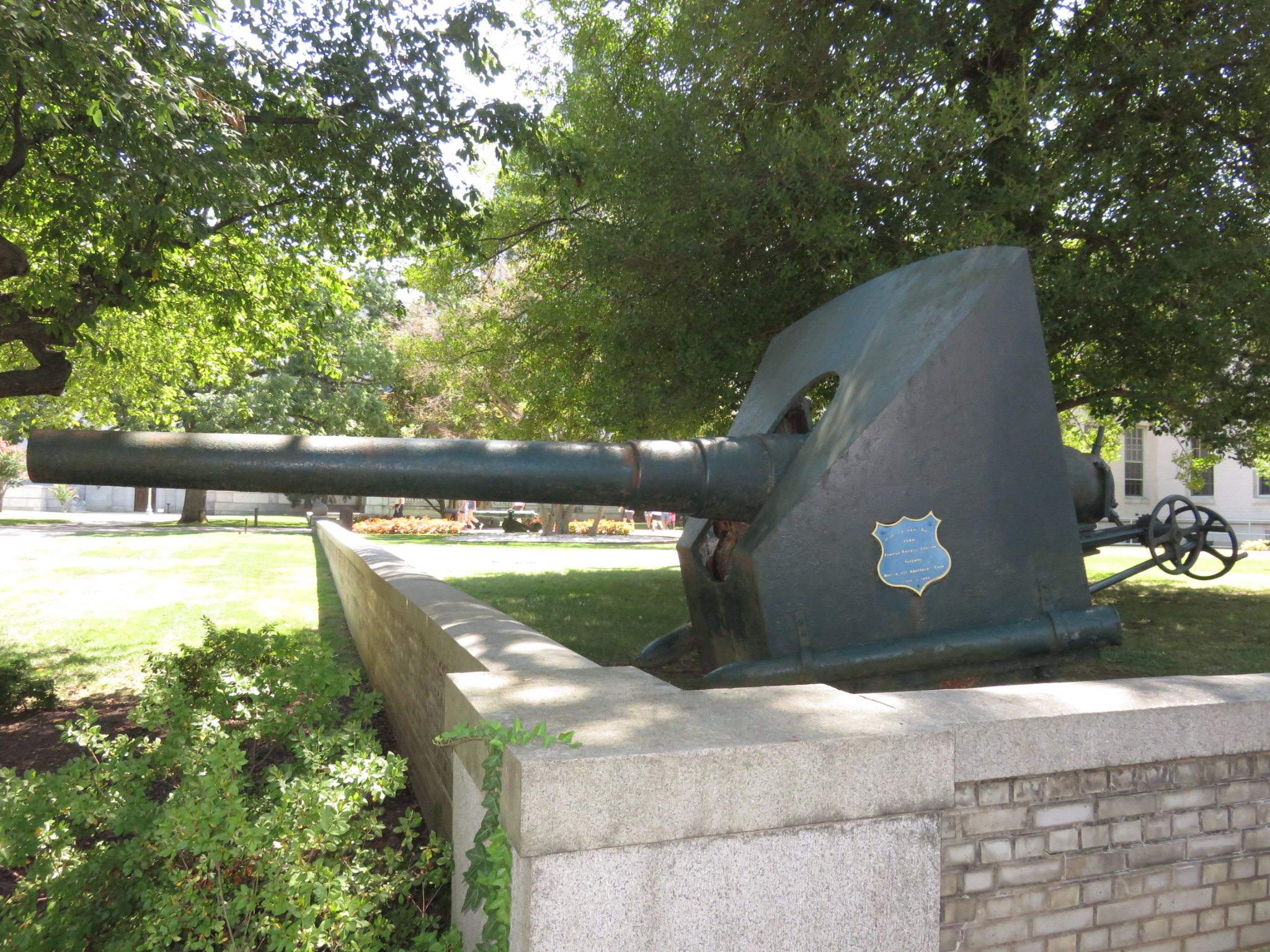
A 140 mm (5.5 in) gun from Vizcaya on display at the United States Naval Academy in Annapolis, Maryland, on 21 August 2016.

== Commemoration ==
Two of Vizcaya's 140-millimetre (5.5 in) naval guns were salvaged from her wreck and is on permanent display at the United States Naval Academy in Annapolis, Maryland and one 140-millimeter gun is on outdoor display at the United States Military Academy at West Point, New York. Another of Vizcaya's 140-millimetre (5.5 in) guns is in Grant Park in Galena, Illinois, and still another is at Historic Fort Wayne in Detroit, Michigan. Finally yet another is on display in Public Square in Cleveland, Ohio.

The Government of Cuba created Cuba's first underwater national monument, the Archaeological Park of the Natural and Cultural Underwater Heritage Battle of Santiago de Cuba, in 2015 along an approximately 120-kilometre (75 mi) stretch of Cuba's southern coast to preserve the wrecks of the ships and pay tribute to sailors who died in the Battle of Santiago de Cuba. Wreck diving is permitted in the park.

== Video gallery ==
| Vizcaya in New York Harbor in February 1898. | The wreck of Vizcaya on 4 July 1898, the day after the Battle of Santiago de Cuba. |
