= USS Vulcan (1884) =

Iron-hulled steamship

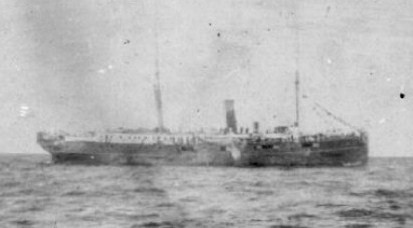

History

United States
- Launched: 1884
- Acquired: 2 May 1884
- Commissioned: 31 May 1898
- Decommissioned: 12 January 1899
- Fate: Sold, 3 July 1899

General characteristics
- Displacement: 1,909 tons
- Length: 265 ft 4 in (80.87 m)
- Beam: 40 ft (12 m)
- Draft: 15 ft 6 in (4.72 m)
- Boats & landing craft carried: One picket boat
- Complement: 197
- Armament: Two six-pounder guns

USS Vulcan was an iron-hulled, schooner-rigged screw steamship acquired by the U.S. Navy for use as a repair ship during the Spanish–American War.

== Service history ==
Chatham—an iron-hulled, schooner-rigged screw steamship constructed at Philadelphia, Pennsylvania, by the American Shipbuilding Co.—was completed in 1884 and acquired by the Navy on 2 May 1898 from the Merchants and Miners Transportation Company, of Baltimore, Maryland. Renamed Vulcan, the erstwhile merchantman underwent a metamorphosis to the Fleet's first repair ship. She was equipped with machine tools, forges, and foundries, and a large supply of widely varied stores. A large force of skilled mechanics rounded out her versatile crew. Commissioned on 31 May 1898 at the Boston Navy Yard, with Lt. Comdr. Ira Harria in command, Vulcan soon sailed for the Caribbean. After preceding via Newport News, Virginia, she arrived at Guantanamo Bay, Cuba, on 1 July in time to be present during the North Atlantic Fleet's bombardment that day of the Spanish forts at Aquadores. The ship served in Cuban waters for the duration of the brief war with Spain and performed yeoman service. On one occasion, while out on nightly patrol, her picket boat, commanded by Naval Cadet Louis G. Miller, drew some 200 shots from Spanish troops ashore. The Spaniards' fire—which the launch spiritedly returned—was ineffective; and all hands returned safely to the ship.

On 3 July, the American Fleet met and soundly trounced a Spanish squadron off Santiago, Cuba. Almost as soon as the smoke of that battle had cleared, the American Navy began making plans to salvage the Spanish vessels. Vulcan performed salvage work on the heavily damaged Spanish ships Infanta Maria Theresa and Cristobal Colon. Vulcan remained in the Caribbean through the cessation of hostilities. Her services as the first ship of her type were exemplary and noteworthy. In the Bureau of Steam Engineering report for 1898, Vulcan's performance was an "unqualified success and of great value in maintaining the efficiency of the fleet." In fact, Vulcan's brief tour with the Fleet had proved to be so valuable to the Navy that the Chief of the Bureau of Steam Engineering recommended the acquisition of a second ship of her type to serve the ships of the U.S. Pacific Fleet.

By the end of August, reports from the repair ship further indicated that she had made repairs to 63 ships and supplied stores to 60. In addition, her "unusual facilities" and the 100 skilled mechanics on board enabled her to effect a wide variety of repairs—including hull work, gun mounts, dynamos, steam pipes, main piston rods for smaller ships, and "iron castings in considerable quantity." In the fall, with her tour thus completed, Vulcan sailed north on 30 October and proceeded to Norfolk, Virginia. The success of Vulcan eventually led the Navy to build specialized repair ships, as well as destroyer and submarine tenders, to provide mobile repair facilities. They were used to great effect during World War II. After shifting to the League Island Navy Yard, Philadelphia, in December 1898, Vulcan was decommissioned there on 12 January 1899 and sold on 3 July of the same year to her original owner. Renamed Chatham, the ship served the Merchants' and Miners' Transportation Co. until 1911 when her name disappeared from the shipping registers.
