= Spanish cruiser Almirante Oquendo =

Spanish Navy cruiser

Coordinates: 19°57′38″N 75°59′37″W

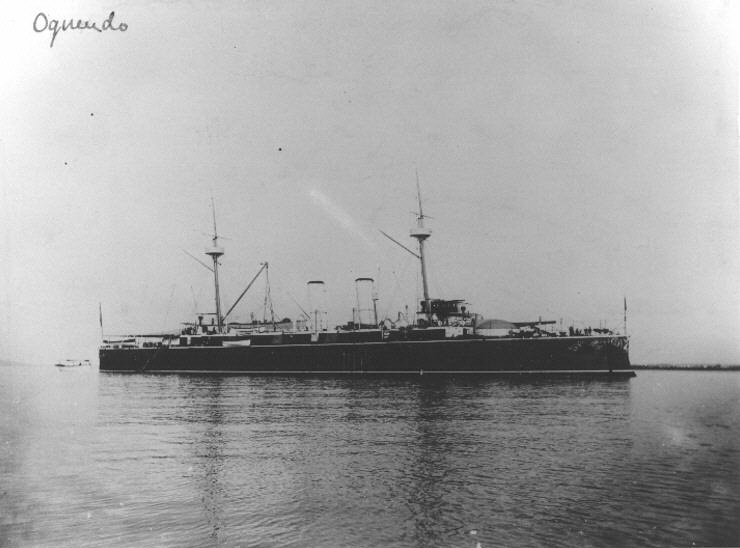
- Almirante Oquendo

History

Spain
- Name: Almirante Oquendo
- Namesake: Captain General Don Antonio de Oquendo (1577–1640)
- Builder: Sociedad Astilleros del Nervión, Sestao, Spain
- Laid down: 16 November 1889
- Launched: 3 October 1891
- Fate: Sunk 3 July 1898

General characteristics
- Class & type: Infanta Maria Teresa-class armored cruiser
- Displacement: 6,890 tons
- Length: 364 ft 0 in (110.95 m)
- Beam: 65 ft 2 in (19.86 m)
- Draft: 21 ft 6 in (6.55 m) maximum
- Installed power: 13,700 ihp (10,200 kW)
- Propulsion: 2-shaft vertical triple expansion
- Speed: 20.2 knots (37.4 km/h; 23.2 mph) (forced draft)
- Complement: 484 officers and enlisted
- Armament: 2 × 28 cm (11.0 in)/35 guns; 10 × 14 cm (5.5 in)/35 guns; 8 × 12 pdr quick-firing guns; 10 × 3 pdr Hotchkiss revolvers; 8 × Nordenfeld machine guns, 2 × Maxim machine guns, 8 × torpedo tubes (2 submerged)
- Armor: Belt 30.5–25.4 cm (12–10 in); Barbettes 22.9 cm (9 in); Conning tower 30.5 cm (12 in); Deck 5.1–7.6 cm (2–3 in)
- Notes: 1,050 tons of coal (normal)

Almirante Oquendo was an Infanta Maria Teresa-class armored cruiser of the Spanish Navy. Launched in 1891, she was named after Antonio de Oquendo, the Spanish naval commander who was decisively defeated at the Battle of the Downs in 1639. Almirante Oquendo was sunk by the United States Navy on 3 July 1898 at the Battle of Santiago de Cuba during the Spanish–American War.

== Construction and characteristics ==
The profile of Almirante Oquendo as she appeared in 1898

Almirante Oquendo and her sister ships Infanta Maria Teresa and Vizcaya were authorized in Spain's 1887 naval program. Inspired by the British Orlando-class armored cruisers, they were built to a design drawn up by Palmers Shipbuilding and Iron Company of Jarrow, England. They had two funnels and were fast and well armed. Their main armament was mounted on the center line in single barbettes fore and aft. Their armor was poor: their 11-inch (279 mm) guns had only lightly armored hoods, their 140-millimetre (5.5 in) guns were mounted in the open on the upper deck, their armor belt was thin and protected only two-thirds of their length, and they had a high, unprotected freeboard that took much damage during the Battle of Santiago de Cuba; one source suggests that despite their classification as armored cruisers, their lack of protection made them more akin to fast, heavily armed protected cruisers than to true armored cruisers. Like other 19th-century warships, they were heavily furnished and decorated with wood, which the Spanish failed to remove prior to combat and which fed fires during the battle.

Almirante Oquendo, Infanta Maria Teresa, and Vizcaya were built by Sociedad Astilleros del Nervión ("Nervión Shipyards") at Sestao, Spain. Almirante Oquendo was laid down on 16 November 1889, and launched on 3 October 1891. While she was fitting out, the shipyard began to experience increasing financial problems during 1891, and these brought the construction of all three cruisers to a standstill in April 1892, prompting the Spanish government to intervene and appoint Capitán de navío (Ship-of-the-line captain) Pascual Cervera y Topete to serve as director of the shipyard. The Spanish Navy decided to move the three incomplete ships to Ferrol to complete fitting-out. Almirante Oquendo departed Sestao under tow on 21 August 1895. The construction delays caused the cost of each cruiser, set at 15 million pesetas when they were ordered, to rise to about 20 million pesetas each by the time of their completion.

== Operational history ==
=== 1896–1898 ===
c. 1897 painting of Almirante Oquendo

When Counter-admiral José Reguera y González Polo took command of the Spanish Navy's Training Squadron in January 1896, it consisted of Almirante Oquendo, Infanta María Teresa, Vizcaya, and the battleship Pelayo. During the first half of August 1897, Almirante Oquendo, Infanta Maria Teresa, Vizcaya, and the torpedo gunboat Destructor visited the Arsenal de Ferrol to have their bottoms cleaned and painted. After loading coal, they departed Ferrol in mid-August for duty with the Training Squadron, by then under the overall command of Counter-admiral Segismundo Bermejo y Merelo, and proceeded to Cádiz, Spain, where the new armored cruiser Cristóbal Colón joined them. The ships subsequently made a cruise along the coast of Galicia before arriving at Lisbon, Portugal, on 23 September 1897. They then headed for Cádiz, which they reached in October 1897. Bermejo then relinquished command of the Training Squadron to take office as Minister of the Navy.

On 30 October 1897 Counter-admiral Pascual Cervera y Topete, a former Minister of the Navy, took charge of the Training Squadron. On 27 November 1897, the squadron – composed of Almirante Oquendo, Infanta María Teresa, Vizcaya (serving as Cervera's flagship), and Cristóbal Colón — got underway from Cádiz and began maneuvers focused on crew training and gunnery practice during a voyage to Levante. Destructor and the destroyers Furor and Terror remained behind in Cádiz until their bottoms were cleaned, but later joined the squadron at Santa Pola, as did the torpedo boats Ariete, Azor, and Rayo from Cartagena. Once all six of the smaller warships had rendezvoused with the cruisers, several exercises took place highlighting simulated night attacks against the other ships by the torpedo boats. The Ministry of the Navy recommended that Cervera keep the maneuvers to a minimum to "save fuel and projectiles," restricting the large-caliber guns of Cervera's cruisers to firing only two rounds each. Nonetheless, Cervera saw enough by the time the maneuvers ended on 22 December 1897 to conclude that his ships, and particularly their gunnery, were in a poor state of readiness for combat. After the maneuvers concluded, the Training Squadron anchored at Alicante on 23 December 1897, and a few days later it arrived at Cartagena.

On the evening of 12 February 1898, Almirante Oquendo got underway from Cartagena bound for Havana to reinforce the Spanish Navy squadron in the Antilles as tensions with the United States rose. On 15 February, the United States Navy armored cruiser USS Maine (often referred to as a "battleship") blew up and sank in Havana Harbor during a goodwill visit to Havana; Spanish authorities attributed the disaster to an accidental internal explosion, but the Americans blamed it on the detonation of a Spanish torpedo or mine. As relations with the United States continued to deteriorate, Vizcaya, which had made a goodwill visit to New York City, rendezvoused with Almirante Oquendo at Havana. Ordered back across the Atlantic Ocean as war approached, both ships were assigned to the Spanish Navy's 1st Squadron, which was concentrating at São Vicente in Portugal's Cape Verde Islands under Cervera's command. The two armored cruisers departed Havana on 1 April 1898 and arrived at São Vicente on 19 April. It was noted that Almirante Oquendo needed drydocking because of a badly fouled bottom which slowed her to a maximum speed of 12 to 14 knots (22 to 26 km/h; 14 to 16 mph) and that her 140-millimetre (5.5 in) guns had defective breech mechanisms and had been supplied with defective ammunition. As the ships gathered at São Vicente, the squadron found that it had a shortage of stokers.

=== Spanish-American War ===
The Spanish–American War began while Almirante Oquendo was at São Vicente when the United States declared war on Spain on 25 April 1898, stipulating that the declaration was restroactive to 21 April. Ordered by neutral Portugal in accordance with international law to leave São Vicente within 24 hours of the declaration of war, Almirante Oquendo and the rest of Cervera's squadron departed on 29 April 1898, bound for San Juan, Puerto Rico. Cervera's ships reached French-owned Martinique in the Lesser Antilles on 10 May 1898. While Almirante Oquendo and the other large ships loitered in international waters, two Spanish destroyers went into Fort-de-France to ask for coal. France was neutral and would not supply coal, so the Spanish squadron departed on 12 May 1898 for Dutch-owned Curaçao, where Cervera expected to meet a collier. Cervera arrived at Willemstad on 14 May, but the Netherlands also was neutral, and strictly enforced its neutrality by allowing only Infanta Maria Teresa and Vizcaya to enter port and permitting them to load only 600 tons of coal. On 15 May, Cervera's ships departed, no longer bound for San Juan, which by now was under a U.S. Navy blockade, but for as-yet unblockaded Santiago de Cuba on the southeastern coast of Cuba, arriving there on 19 May 1898. Cervera hoped to refit his ships there before he could be trapped.His squadron was still in the harbor of Santiago de Cuba when the U.S. Navy's Flying Squadron arrived on 27 May 1898 and began a blockade – reinforced by the arrival of the U.S. Navy's North Atlantic Squadron on 1 June— which would drag on for 37 days.

Almirante Oquendo and the other ships endured occasional American naval bombardments of the harbor. Almirante Oquendo still had one 140-millimetre (5.5 in) gun out of commission, 80 percent of her 140-millimetre (5.5 in) ammunition was defective, and nothing could be done under the circumstances about her fouled bottom. Some of her men joined others from the fleet in a Naval Brigade to fight ashore against a United States Army overland drive toward Santiago de Cuba.

By the beginning of July 1898, that drive threatened to capture Santiago de Cuba, and Cervera decided that his squadron's only hope was to try to escape into the open sea by running the blockade. The decision was made on 1 July 1898, with the break-out set for 3 July 1898. The crew of Almirante Oquendo spent 2 July 1898 returning from Naval Brigade service ashore and preparing for action. Almirante Oquendo was to be the fourth ship in line during the escape, following Cervera's flagship Infanta Maria Teresa, Vizcaya, and the armored cruiser Cristobal Colon, with the destroyers Furor and Pluton bringing up the rear. While Infanta Maria Teresa sacrificed herself by attacking the fastest American ship, the armored cruiser USS Brooklyn, Almirante Oquendo and the others were to put on all the speed they could and run westward for the open sea.

At about 08:45 on 3 July 1898, the Spanish ships got underway. The U.S. squadron sighted the Spanish ships in the channel at about 09:35, and the Battle of Santiago de Cuba began.

While Infanta Maria Teresa and Vizacaya charged Brooklyn and the two destroyers turned westward farther inshore, Almirante Oquendo followed Cristobal Colon in a dash to the west. When Brooklyn turned away to the east, Vizcaya and Infanta Maria Teresa also turned west, brushing past the last obstacle in the path of the four Spanish armored cruisers, the armed yacht USS Vixen.

Almirante Oquendo now found herself back in the line-ahead formation the squadron had formed when it left its anchorage, in fourth place behind the other three armored cruisers, although now without the following destroyers, which were being chased farther inshore. The U.S. squadron gave chase as the Spanish ships made an all-out break for the west, with the American ships about a mile to port of and slightly astern of the Spanish ships. At 1035, the sinking Infanta Maria Teresa was driven ashore with heavy damage and fires.

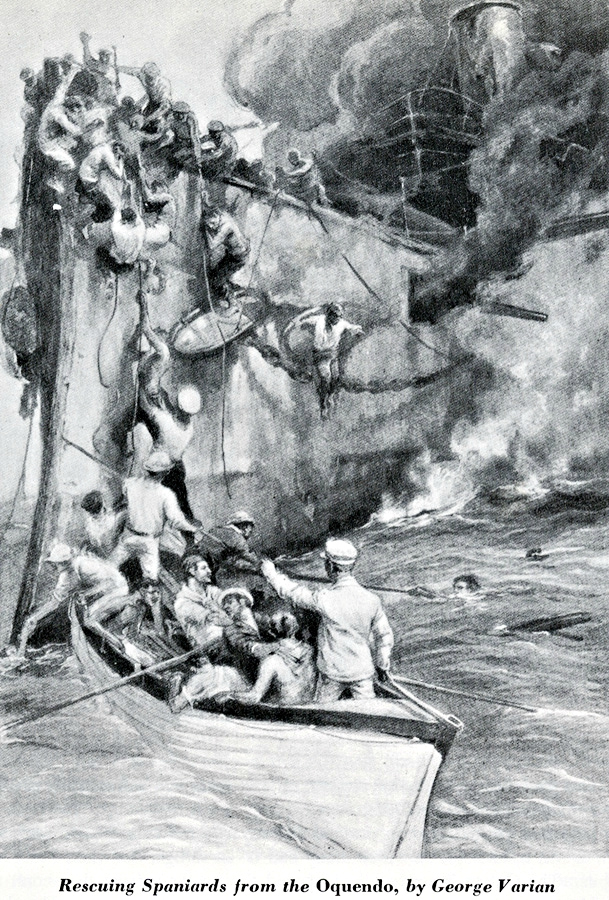
U.S. Navy sailors rescuing Almirante Oquendo′s crew from her wreck on 3 July 1898

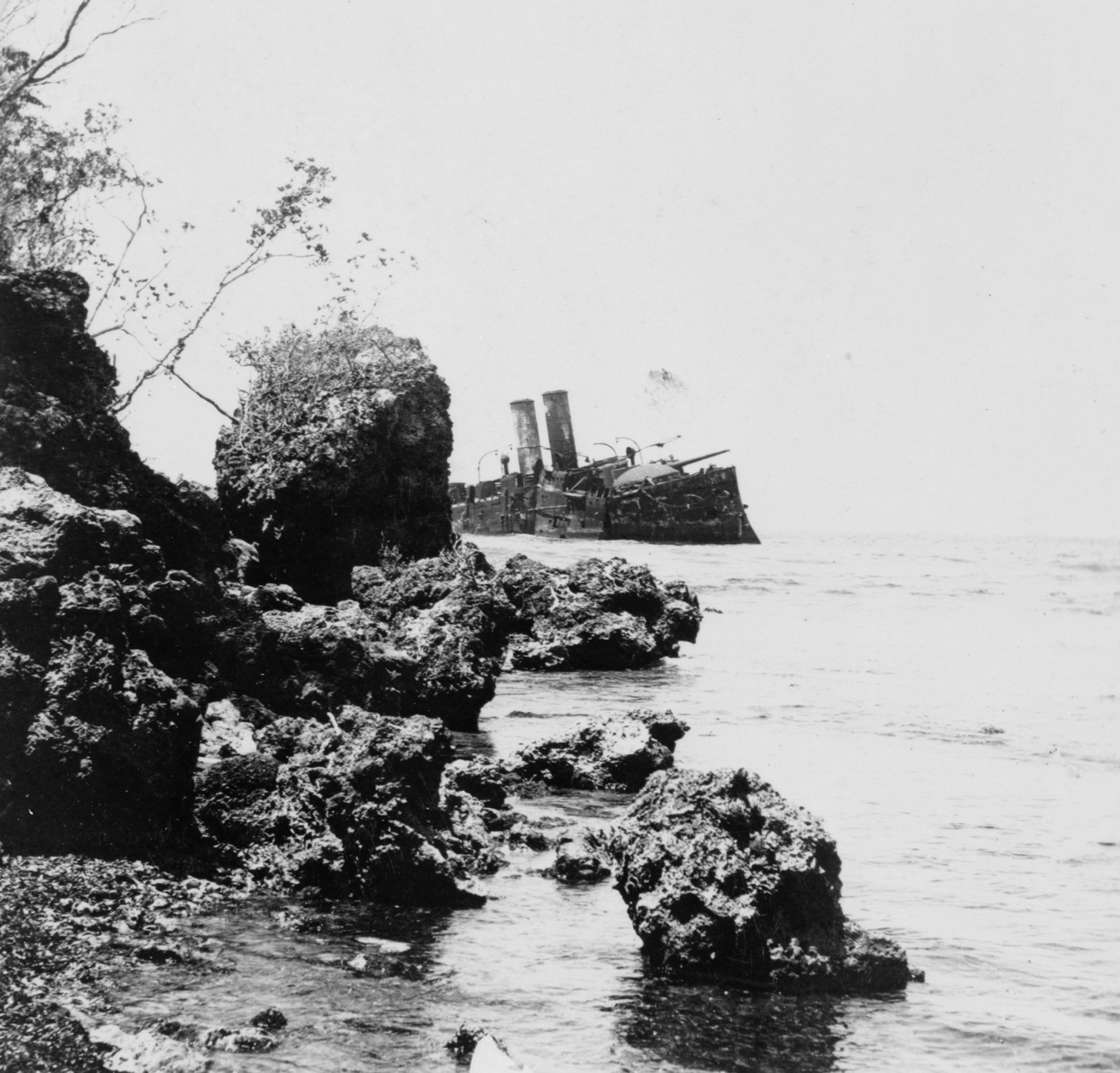
The wreck of Almirante Oquendo, circa 1899

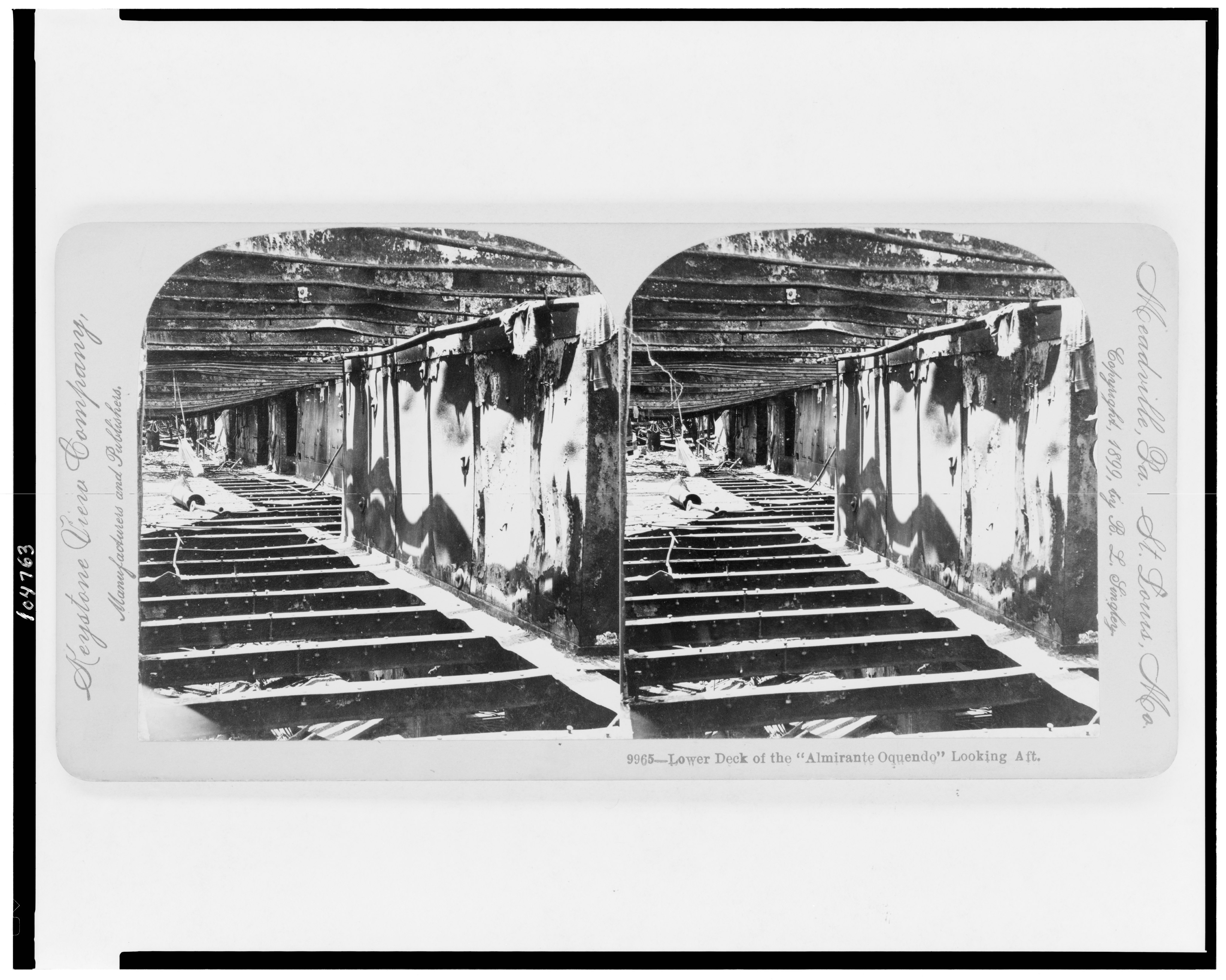
Both images of an 1899 stereograph of the lower deck of the wreck of Almirante Oquendo looking aft

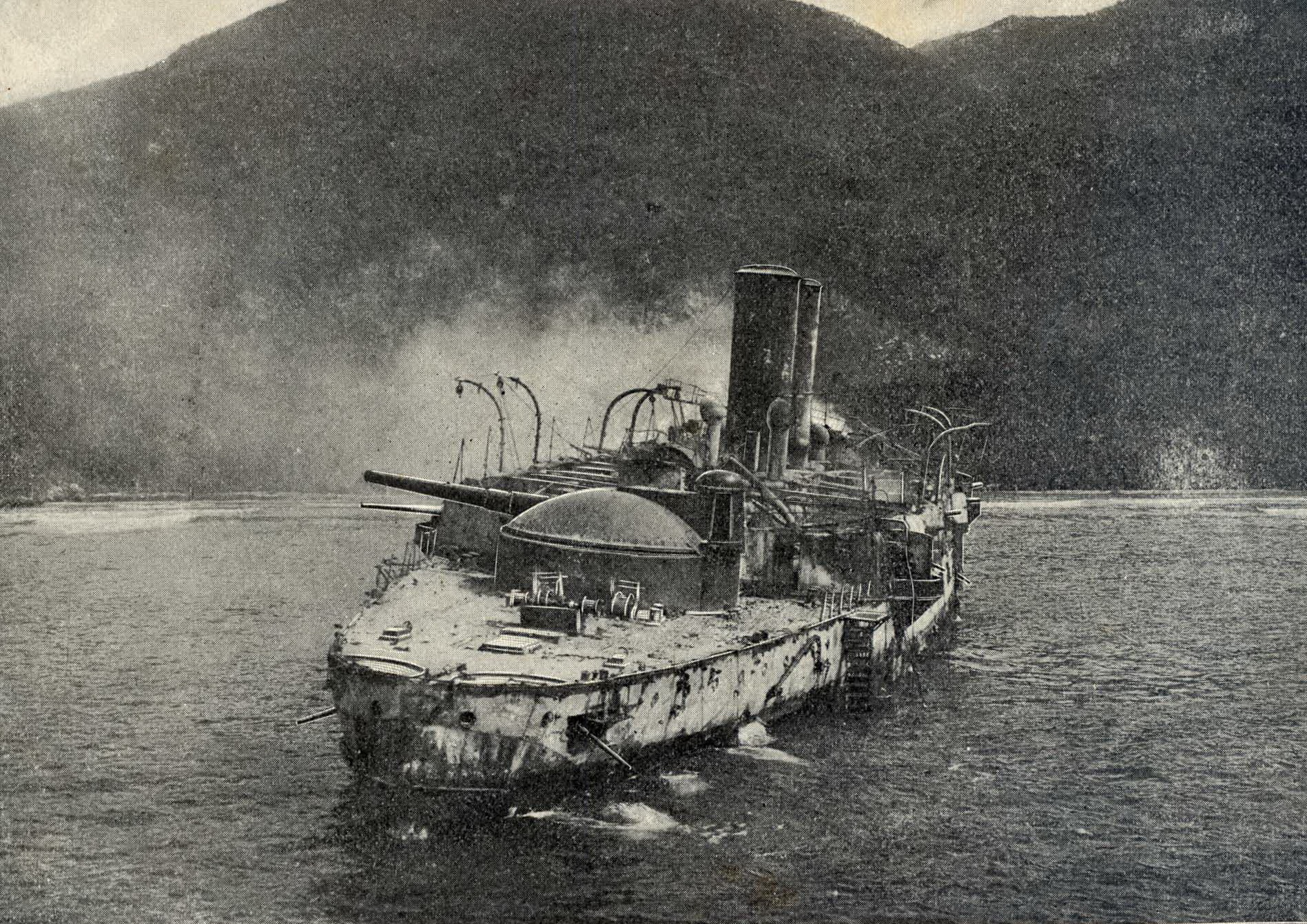
The wreck of Almirante Oquendo in 1898

As last ship in the Spanish line during a stern chase, Almirante Oquendo naturally drew more than her share of attention from her pursuers. The battleship USS Iowa was only 1,600 yards (1,500 m) off her port quarter, while the battleships USS Oregon and USS Indiana also were closing from that direction, and Brooklyn was on her port bow. Concentrated fire from the three battleships punished Almirante Oquendo. Iowa scored 43 six-pounder hits which killed or wounded most of the sailors on the Spanish cruiser's upper decks, where her 140-millimetre (5.5 in) guns were mounted without protection, and one of her own 140-millimetre (5.5 in) shells exploded prematurely in the gun's breach, killing the gun's crew. Almirante Oquendo drew admiration from her opponents by lashing back with a high volume of shell- and machine-gun fire. But she took three 8-inch (203 mm), one 6-inch (152 mm), one 5-inch (127 mm), and nine 4-inch (102 mm) hits, and soon a fire started in her after torpedo room that could not be brought under control and threatened to spark an ammunition explosion that would have wrecked the ship. Her commanding officer ordered her to be scuttled, and she turned out of the line and ran for shore, beaching about 700 metres (770 yards) offshore, a few hundred yards (meters) to the west of Infanta Maria Teresa and about 6.8 nautical miles (7.8 miles; 12.6 kilometres) west of Santiago de Cuba, at around 10:30.

Some of her sailors made it ashore, although they had to beware of Cuban insurgents, who began to shoot the survivors of the wrecked Spanish ships. Others were rescued by American sailors who brought small boats alongside the wrecks to take off survivors. Almirante Oquendo suffered 61 hits and lost 80 dead in the engagement, including her commanding officer; sources disagree on whether he suffered a heart attack or was mortally wounded.

Postwar, a U.S. Navy survey team evaluating Spanish wrecks for their potential for being raised and put in American service concluded that Almirante Oquendo was beyond salvage.

== Commemoration ==
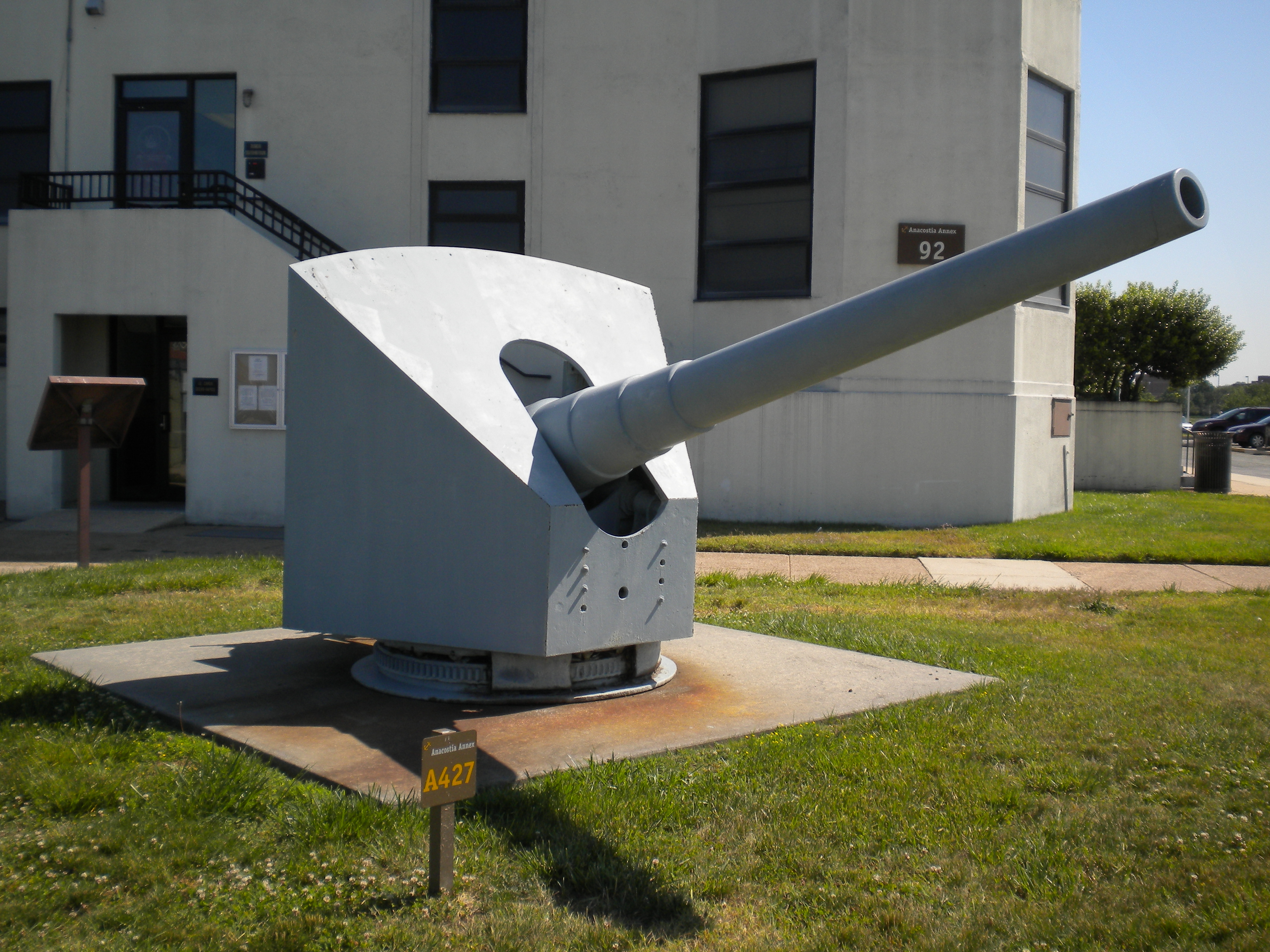
Hontoria 140-mm (5.5-inch) gun from Almirante Oquendo on display at Joint Base Anacostia–Bolling in Washington, D.C.

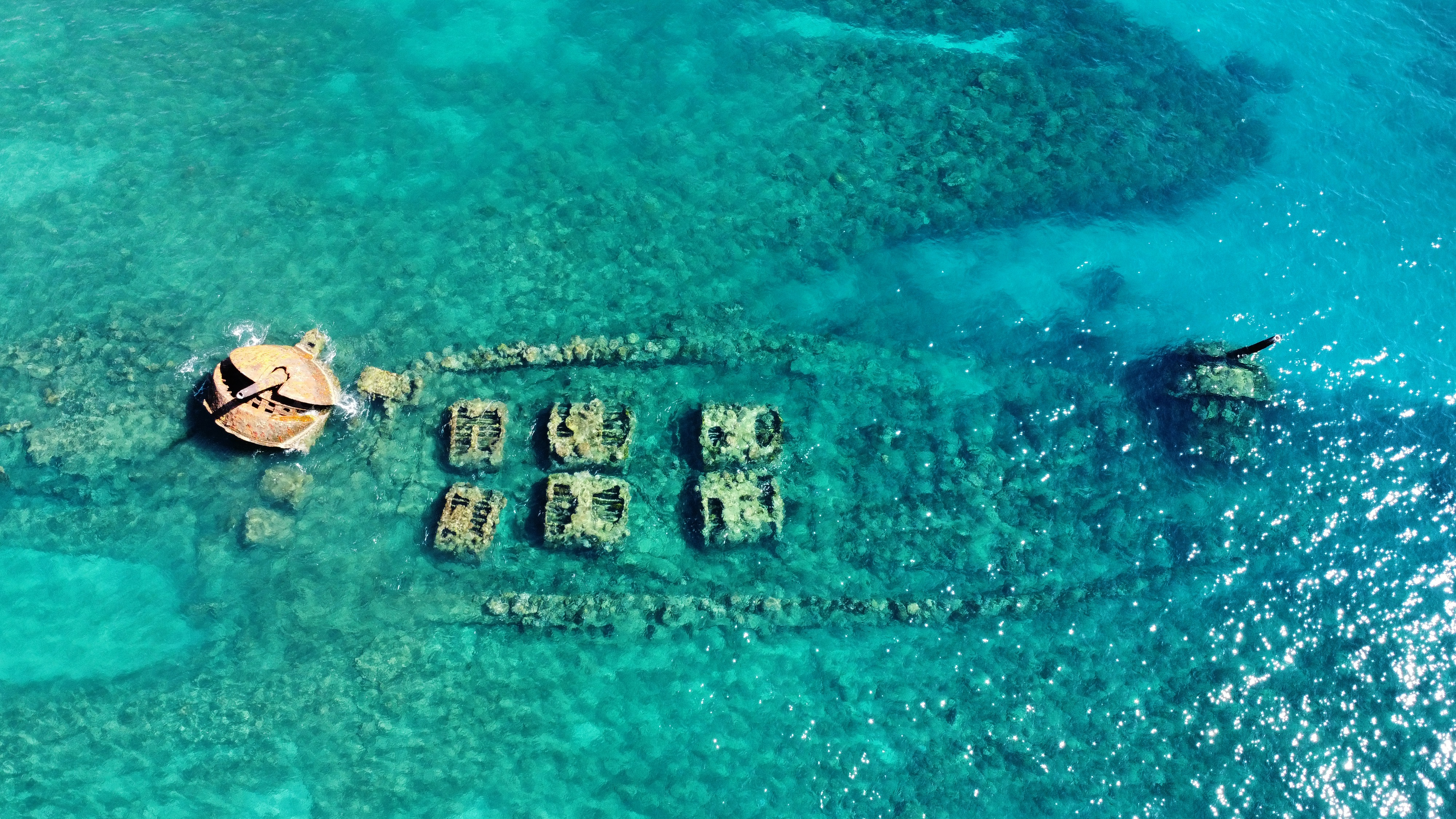
Aerial view of the wreck of Almirante Oquendo on 21 November 2022

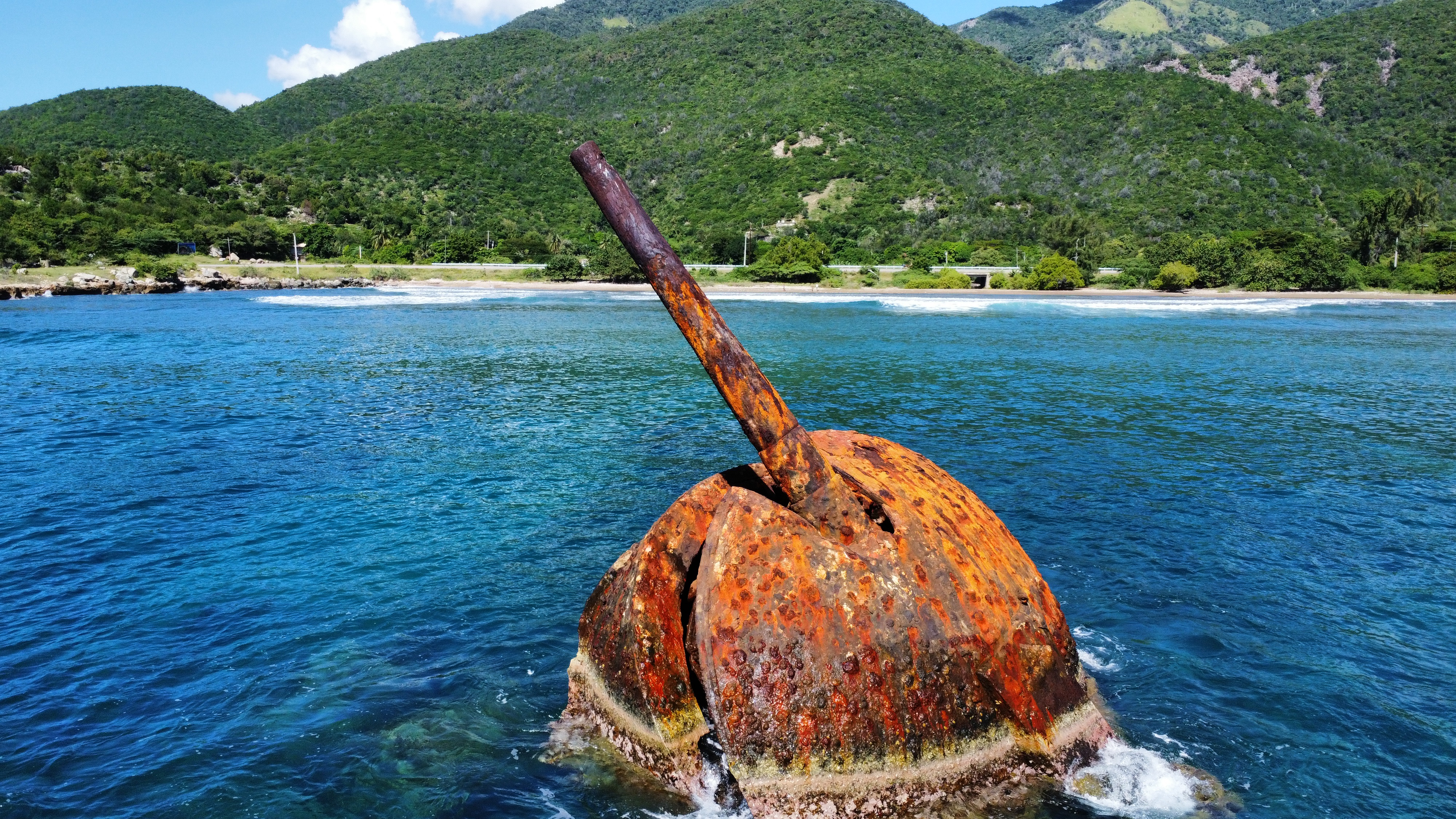
An 11-inch (279 mm) gun aboard the wreck of Almirante Oquendo on 21 November 2022

Three Hontoria 140-mm (5.5-inch) guns from Almirante Oquendo are on display in the United States. One – with damage to its shield incurred during the ship's final battle – is located outside the U.S. Navy Personnel Support Detachment office (Building 92) at Joint Base Anacostia–Bolling in Washington, D.C. A plaque mounted near the gun reads:

THE GUN

This Hontoria 140mm (5.5 in) naval gun was taken from the Spanish cruiser ALMIRANTE OQUENDO following her capture at the Battle of Santiago de Cuba on 3 July 1898 during the Spanish American War. ALMIRANTE OQUENDO, of the INFANTA MARIA TERESA class, was one of six Spanish ships which sortied from the Cuban port to avoid capture in the harbor. None escaped the blockading U.S. Naval Squadron. The hole in the gun's shield was inflicted by one of approximately 50 rounds which hit ALMIRANTE OQUENDO.

The gun was restored by sailors of Processing Division and General Detail, Naval District Washington, during 1982 and 1983.

Another gun is on display at the Jefferson Barracks Military Post in Missouri. The third gun, mounted in 1903 to commemorate Rear Admiral William T. Sampson – who was in overall operational command of the U.S. naval forces that fought in the Battle of Santiago de Cuba – is on display in a park in Palmyra, New York.

The Government of Cuba created Cuba's first underwater national monument, the Archaeological Park of the Natural and Cultural Underwater Heritage Battle of Santiago de Cuba, in 2015 along an approximately 120-kilometre (75 mi) stretch of Cuba's southern coast to preserve the wrecks of the ships remaining there and pay tribute to sailors who died in the Battle of Santiago de Cuba. Wreck diving is permitted in the park.
