= Infanta Maria Teresa-class cruiser =

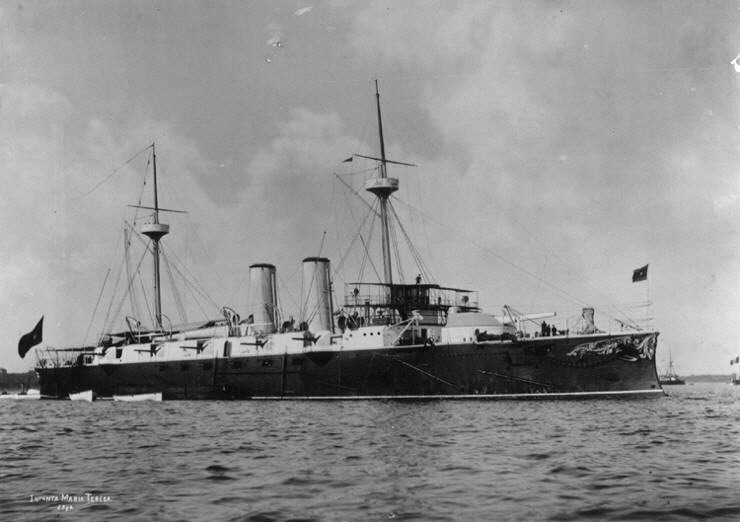
- Infanta Maria Teresa, probably in 1895 while attending opening ceremonies for the Kiel Canal in Germany

Class overview
- Name: Infanta Maria Teresa class
- Builders: Sociedad Astilleros del Nervión, Bilbao, Spain
- Operators: Spanish Navy
- Succeeded by: Emperador Carlos V
- Built: 1889–1893
- In commission: 1893–1898
- Planned: 3
- Completed: 3
- Lost: 3

General characteristics
- Type: Armored cruiser
- Displacement: 6,890 tons
- Length: 364 ft (111 m)
- Beam: 65 ft 2 in (19.86 m)
- Draft: 21 ft 6 in (6.55 m) maximum
- Speed: 20.2 knots (37.4 km/h)
- Complement: 484
- Armament: 2 × 28 cm (11.0 in)/35 guns; 10 × 14 cm (5.5 in)/35 guns; 10 × 12-pounder guns; 10 × 3-pounder Hotchkiss revolvers; 8 × Nordenfeld machine guns; 2 × Maxim machine guns; 8 × torpedo tubes (2 submerged)
- Armor: Belt 12–10 in (30.5–25.4 cm); Barbettes 9 in (22.9 cm); Conning tower 12 in (30.5 cm); Deck 2–3 in (5.1–7.6 cm)
- Notes: 1,050 tons of coal (normal)

The Infanta Maria Teresa class of three armored cruisers were built for the Spanish Navy between 1889 and 1893. All three were sunk in action against the United States Navy during the Battle of Santiago de Cuba in 1898.

== Description ==
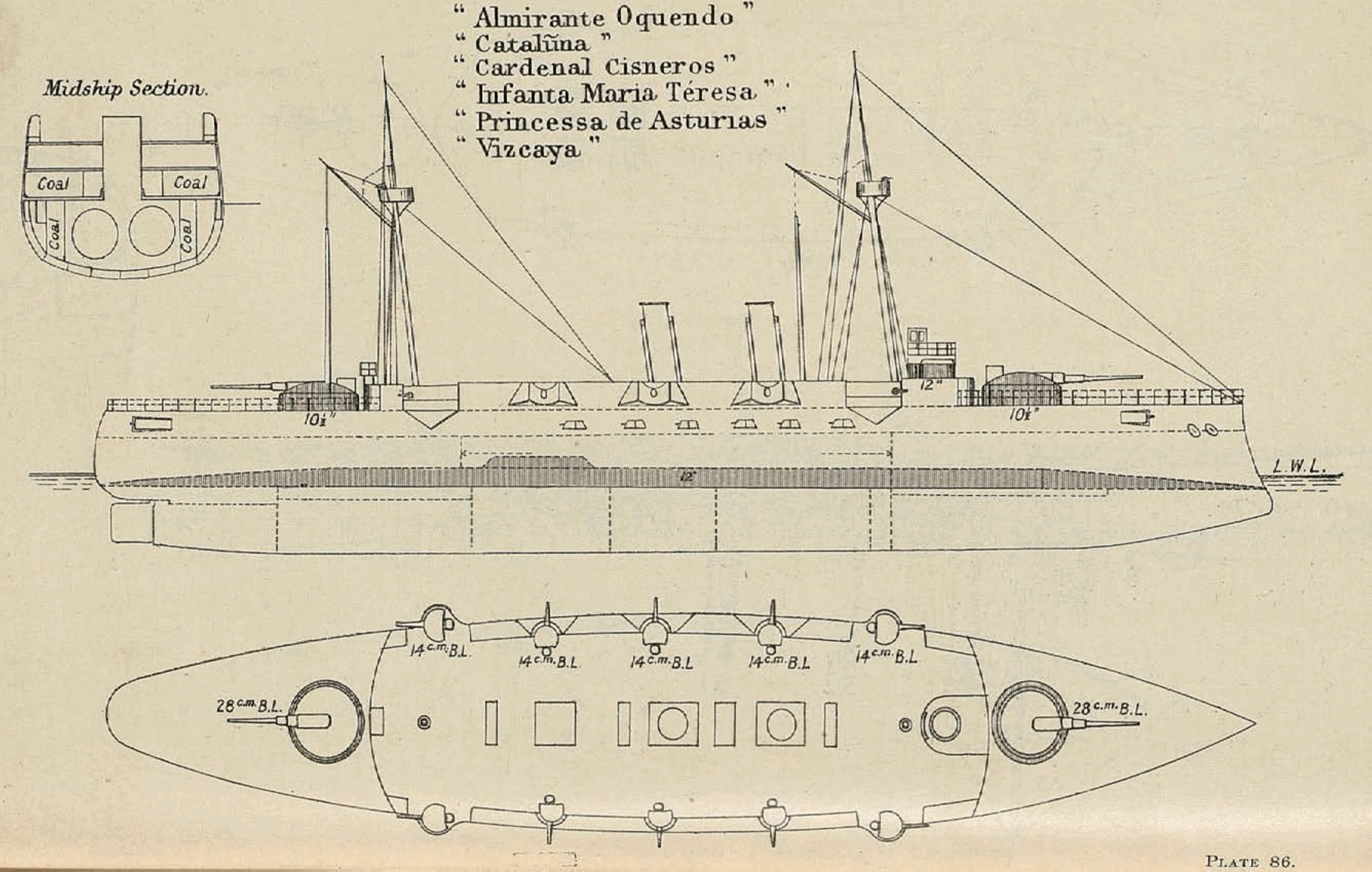
Right elevation, deck plan, and hull section as depicted in Brassey's Naval Annual of 1896.

The naval shipyard at Bilbao, Spain, built all three units of the Infanta Maria Teresa class. Originally, the Spanish Navy had planned to build sister ships of the battleship Pelayo, but a crisis with the German Empire in the Caroline Islands in 1885 caused Spain to divert money budgeted for the battleships to the Infanta Maria Teresa class instead. The armored cruisers were considered more desirable than additional battleships at the time because their greater speed and steaming range made them better suited for responses to colonial crises.

Infanta María Teresa and her two sister ships were versions inspired by the British armored cruisers of the Orlando class, with a larger size and more powerful artillery and displacing 5,000 tons, with armor based on the same principle.

The two-funnelled Infanta Maria Teresa class was fast and well-armed, with 11-inch (279 mm) (Hontoria) guns mounted in barbettes on the center line fore and aft and a large secondary battery of 5.5-inch (140 mm) guns. However, their protection was poor. The armor belt was narrow and stretched for only two-thirds of the length of the hulls, the main guns had only lightly armored hoods, the 5.5-inch guns were mounted in the open on the upper deck, and the ships had a high, unprotected freeboard. Their upper decks were planked-over beams without steel plating. The ships also were heavily decorated and furnished with wood, which the Spanish failed to remove before combat and which would feed fires after enemy shell hits.

== History ==
The Infanta Maria Teresa-class armored cruisers were active units, serving both in European and American waters. After the outbreak of the Spanish–American War, all three were assigned to the 1st Squadron, commanded by Vice Admiral Pascual Cervera y Topete, in which all three were sunk at the Battle of Santiago de Cuba.

== Ships in class ==
=== Infanta Maria Teresa ===
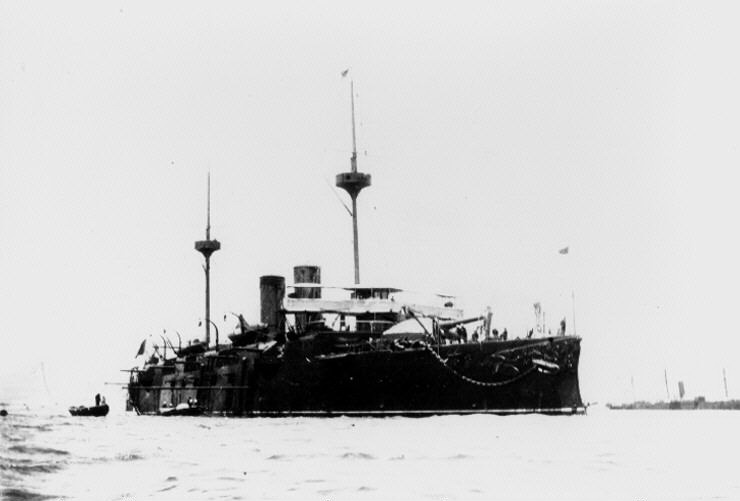
Infanta Maria Teresa in April 1898.

Ordered in 1889, laid down in 1890, launched on 30 August 1890 and completed in 1893, Infanta Maria Teresa was named for a Spanish princess. In Spain at the outbreak of the Spanish–American War in April 1898, she was sent along with her sisters to the Caribbean as part of Cervera's squadron, blockaded for 37 days in the harbor of Santiago de Cuba, and sunk in the Battle of Santiago de Cuba on 3 July 1898.

=== Vizcaya ===
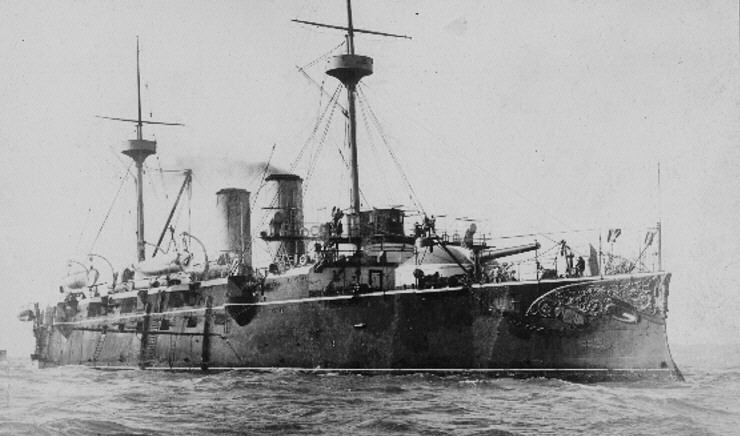
Vizcaya sometime between 1893 and 1898.

Ordered in 1889, launched on 8 July 1891, and completed in 1893, Vizcaya was named for a Spanish province. She was visiting New York City at the time of the destruction of armored cruiser USS Maine in February 1898. Ordered across the Atlantic to join Cervera in the Cape Verde Islands, she was sent along with her sisters to the Caribbean as part of Cervera's squadron, blockaded for 37 days in the harbor of Santiago de Cuba, and sunk in the Battle of Santiago de Cuba on 3 July 1898.

=== Almirante Oquendo ===
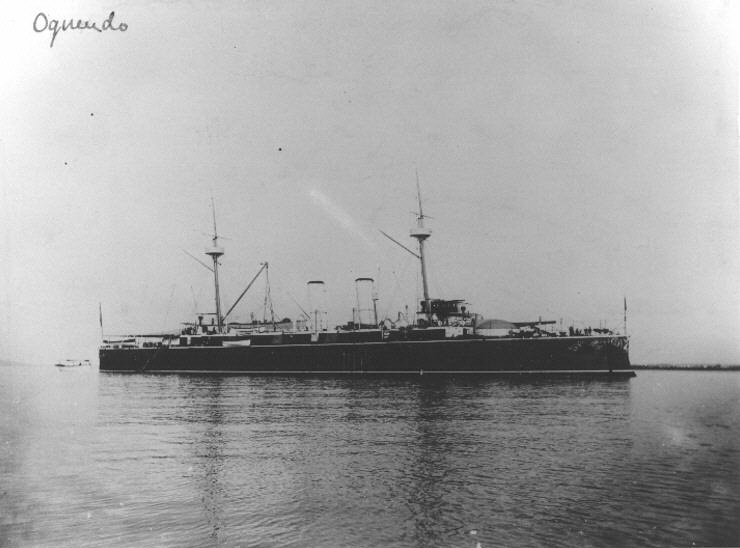
Almirante Oquendo sometime between 1893 and 1898.

Laid down in January 1889, launched in 1891, and completed in 1893, Almirante Oquendo was in Havana, Cuba when war with the United States became likely in the spring of 1898. Ordered across the Atlantic to join Cervera in the Cape Verde Islands, she was sent along with her sisters to the Caribbean as part of Cervera's squadron, blockaded for 37 days in the harbor of Santiago de Cuba, and sunk in the Battle of Santiago de Cuba on 3 July 1898.

== See also ==
- Princesa de Asturias-class cruiser: a class of three armoured cruisers that improved upon the Infanta Maria Teresa-class
