= Brownson =

Brownson is a surname. Notable people with the surname include:

- Callie Brownson (born 1989), American football coach
- Carleton Lewis Brownson (1866–1948), American educator
- Charles B. Brownson (1914–1988), American politician
- Derry Brownson (born 1970), English musician
- Deborah Brownson (born 1974), British autism campaigner
- Helen Brownson (1917–2017), American information scientist
- Isabella Brownson (born 1998), English actress
- James I. Brownson (1817–1899), American clergyman and academic
- John W. Brownson (New York politician) (1807–1860), American politician
- John W. Brownson (Wisconsin politician), (1842-?), American politician
- Mark Brownson (1975–2017), American baseball player
- Nathan Brownson (1742–1796), American physician and politician
- Oliver Brownson (1746–1815), American composer and publisher
- Orestes Brownson (1803–1876), American philosopher and writer
- Robert Brownson (1922–1975), American football and basketball coach
- Sarah Brownson (1839–1876), American writer
- Willard H. Brownson (1845–1935), American naval admiral

== See also ==
- Brownson Islands, outside the entrance to Cranton Bay
- USS Brownson (DD-518), aFletcher-class destroyer, launched in 1942 and sunk in action 1943
- USS Brownson (DD-868), a Gearing-class destroyer, launched in 1945 and struck in 1976
