= Action of 13 June 1898 =

- Part of the Spanish–American War
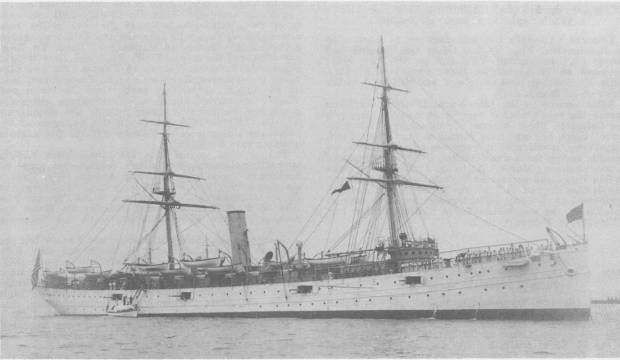
- USS Yankee, circa 1898
Date	13 June 1898
Location	Off Cienfuegos, Caribbean Sea
Result	Spanish victory

Belligerents
Spain	United States

Commanders and leaders
Juan de Carranza	Willard Brownson

Strength
3 gunboats	1 auxiliary cruiser

Casualties and losses
6 wounded 1 gunboat damaged	2 wounded 1 auxiliary cruiser damaged

The action of 13 June 1898 was a minor naval engagement of the Spanish–American War fought near Cienfuegos, Cuba, between the American auxiliary cruiser USS Yankee under Commander Willard Herbert Brownson and the Spanish gunboat Diego Velázquez under Teniente de Navío de 1ª clase Juan de Carranza, which had exited the port to inspect a suspicious steamer which proved to be Yankee. Diego Velázquez, markedly inferior to Yankee in armament, managed to return to Cienfuegos, where it was joined by the small gunboats Lince and Cometa. After the appearance of the latters, Yankee decided to withdraw.

== Background ==
At the outbreak of the Spanish–American War Cienfuegos was a strategically important port due to its facilities and good communications with Havana. Some prewar plans recommended its prompt capture, but instead it was blockaded, along with some other important ports of the southern coast of Cuba such as Santiago de Cuba and Manzanillo. The most powerful Spanish naval units of the island, meanwhile, had been gathered in Santiago, and submarine defenses consisting mainly of torpedoes had been installed in the major ports of Havana, Cienfuegos, Santiago and San Juan de Puerto Rico. The naval units based in Cienfuegos consisted of the 541-ton torpedo gunboat Galicia under Teniente de Navío de 1ª clase Ariño, the 300-ton torpedo gunboat Vasco Núñez de Balboa under Teniente de Navío de 1ª clase Izquierdo, the 318-ton torpedo gunboat Alsedo under Teniente de Navío Suences, and the 200-ton torpedo gunboat Diego Velázquez under Teniente de Navío de 1ª clase Carranza, plus the 179-ton gunboat Contramaestre and the 43-ton small gunboats Gaviota, Cometa, Lince and Satélite, commanded respectively by Tenientes de Navío Freire, Rivero, Gómez Aguado and Moreno Eliza.

Various engagements were fought near Cienfuegos during the war. On 29 April the American protected cruiser Marblehead and the auxiliary Eagle exchanged fire for half an hour with the Spanish small gunboats Satélite, Lince and Gaviota. On 2 May the gunboat Alcedo and the small gunboats Almendores and Gaviota escorted several transport vessels to Casilda, delivering to the town more than 3,000 men and about 800 horses and mules. A week later two small boats of Marblehead and the gunboat Nashville tried to cut telegraph cables linking Cienfuegos with Madrid. Two undersea cables were cut, but a third cable near the shore remained untouched. On 1 June a convoy of blockade runners and the transport María Cristina were successfully escorted into the port.

== Battle ==
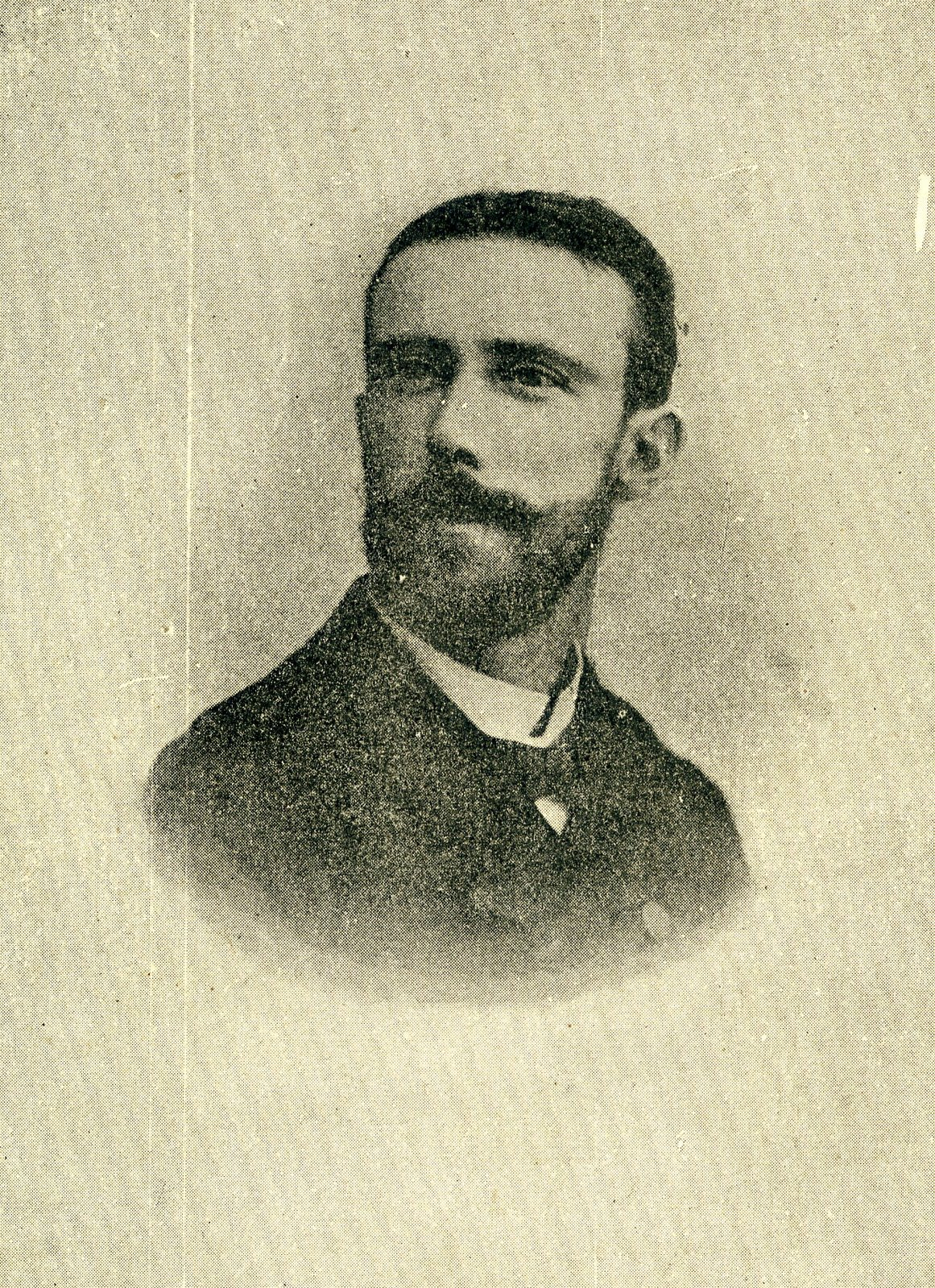
Teniente de Navío de 1ª clase Juan de Carranza, commander of Diego Velázquez.

On 13 June Teniente Carranza's Diego Velázquez was dispatched to inspect a steamer near the port thinking that it could be El Purísima Concepción, a blockade runner which was expected to arrive to Cienfuegos at that time. Carranza took precautions in case the suspicious steamer proved to be an American warship. Wooden objects were left ashore, and bags of coal were emplaced around the guns to protect their crews from the American fire. The unknown steamer was USS Yankee, a 6,888-ton auxiliary cruiser under Commander Willard H. Brownson armed with 10 5-inch guns, 6 6-pound guns and two Colt machine guns. Yankee was carrying out blockade tasks off the port, and was in fact waiting for the arrival of El Purísima Concepción in order to intercept it.

At about 1,400 meters range, the American ship put her helm over, unmasked her port battery, and opened fire. Diego Velázquez opted for a running fight, presenting the smallest possible target and only allowing Yankee to bring one or two of her guns to bear without turning away from her target's course. The Spanish gunboat was hit twice, receiving minor damage. A grenade entered through the starboard hawse and broke the retainers of the redbout, throwing up the parapet of coal. Another grenade pierced the hull of the cone that served as a carriage for one of the guns. Boatswain D. José Cacho Torres, cabo de mar de primera Eustaquio Bilbao, seamen Antonio Ferrer and José González, and gunners Francisco González and Ángel Bermudose were injured. Diego Velázquez fired 193 shots, some of which hit Yankee inflicting some casualties and causing a small fire on board which forced the gunfire to be temporarily suspended.

After 69 minutes of combat, Diego Velázquez reached Cienfuegos, where the wounded men were disembarked and reinforcements were requested to face Yankee, which was exchanging fire with the shore batteries of Cienfuegos. Diego Velázquez exited the port shortly after accompanied by the small gunboats Lince and Cometa. According to Spanish sources, the American ship decided to withdraw from the battle at this point, and the Spanish vessels returned to Cienfuegos. According to American sources, the Spanish gunboats withdrew to Cienfuegos harbor and Yankee continued firing on Sabanilla Battery until it withdrew at 1500 hours. Teniente Carranza was acclaimed as his force re-entered the port. The fierce opposition of his gunboat confused the Americans, whose commander Willard H. Brownson believed that the ship that he was facing was the torpedo gunboat Galicia, a ship almost three times larger than Diego Velázquez. El urísima Concepción eventually reached Cienfuegos without difficulties while Yankee set a course back to the eastern end of Cuba.

== Aftermath ==
The Action of 13 June 1898 was the last naval engagement fought near Cienfuegos. Land operations to capture the town, which remained open as a supply route to Havana and was the headquarters of one of the five corps in which Cuba had been divided, were recommended by the Cuban general Máximo Gómez to General William Shafer, but that plan was never carried out. The action of Cienfuegos was one of the events in which the Spanish coastguards successfully battled the American auxiliary fleet or Mosquito Squadron. At the end of the war Diego Velázquez sailed to the French colony of Martinique and then back to Spain, but was eventually sold to Venezuela on 17 July 1899. Named Miranda, she served in the Venezuelan Navy for many years. Juan de Carranza died from illness in Cuba in 1899.

== Order of battle ==
Spain

Gunboats

- Diego Velázquez
- Lince
- Cometa

United States

Auxiliary cruiser

- USS Yankee

== Bibliography ==
- Donald H. Dyal, Brian B. Carpenter, Mark A. Thomas, Historical dictionary of the Spanish American War. Greenwood Publishing Group (1996). ISBN 0-313-28852-6
- Hermenegildo Franco Castañón, El combate naval del 3 de julio: Un desastre anunciado, in Cuad. Monogr. Inst. Hist. Cult. Nav. Inst. de Historia y Cultura Naval, Madrid (1998).
- Agustín Ramón Rodríguez González, Buques de la armada española a través de la fotografía, 1849–1900. Agualarga (2001). ISBN 84-95088-37-1
- Agustín Ramón Rodríguez González, Bloqueo y Combates en La Habana y Cienfuegos in Revista General de Marina, Vol. 255 (2008). ISSN 0034-9569
- David Solar, Una guerra por encima de las posibilidades españolas, in Historia y Comunicación Social, nº 3: La guerra del 98 y los medios de comunicación. Departamento de Historia de la Comunicación Social, Servicio de Publicaciones, Universidad Complutense de Madrid (1998). ISSN 1137-0734
- El Mundo Naval Ilustrado. Hijos de M. G. Hernández, Madrid, (15/08/1898). ISSN 9954-8585
- Yankee in Dictionary of American Naval Fighting Ships. Navy Dept., Office of the Chief of Naval Operations, Naval History Division.
