= USS Brownson =

Two ships of the United States Navy have borne the name Brownson, in honor of Rear Admiral Willard H. Brownson:

- USS Brownson (DD-518), was a Fletcher-class destroyer, launched in 1942 and sunk in action 1943.
- USS Brownson (DD-868), was a Gearing-class destroyer, launched in 1945 and struck in 1976.
