= Juan de Carranza Fernández de la Reguera =

Spanish general (1857–1899)

Benemérito de la Patria Juan de Carranza Fernández de la Reguera
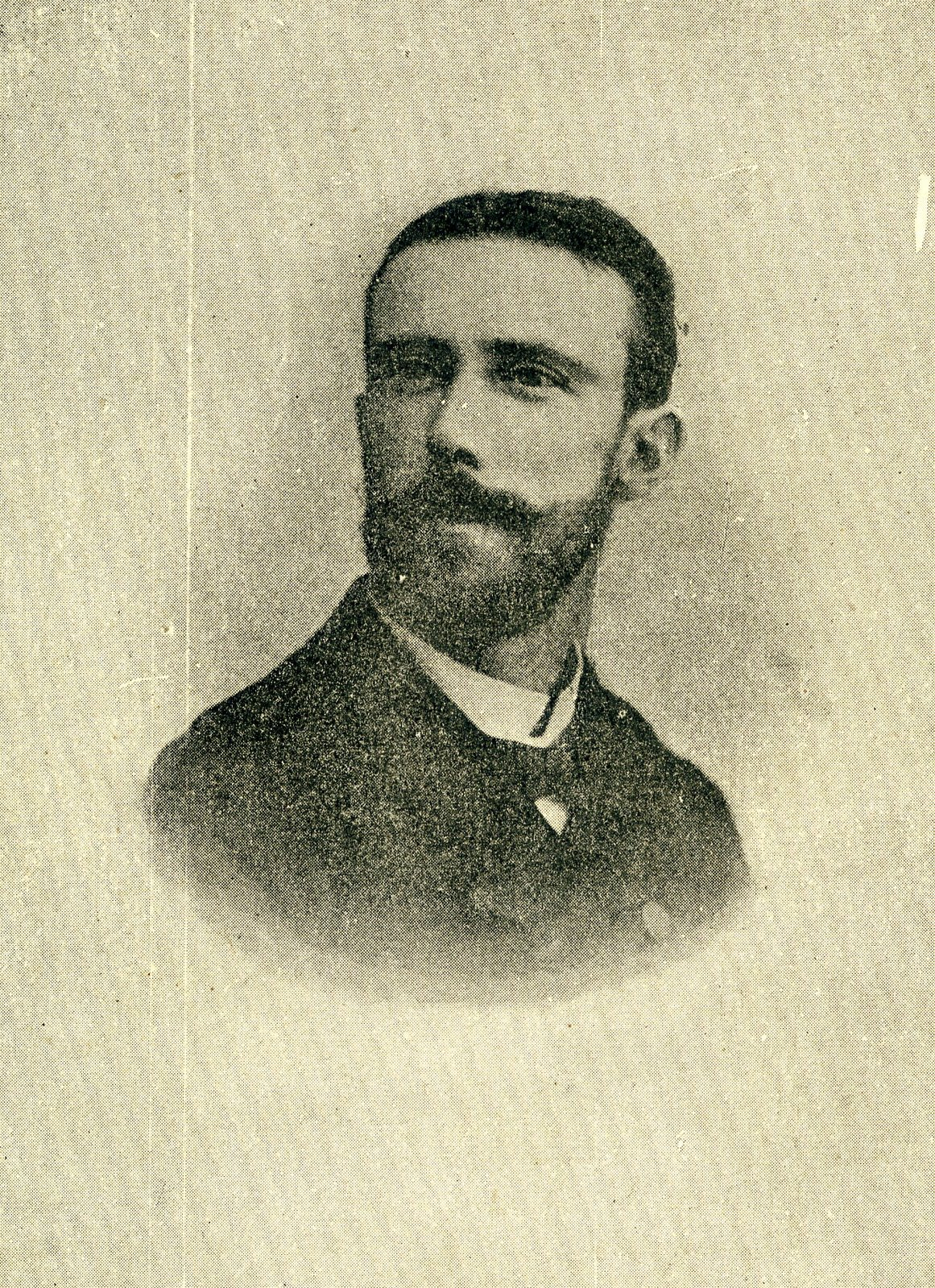
- Born: January 30, 1857; Ferrol, A Coruña, Spain
- Died: February 5, 1899 (aged 42); Fort-de-France, Martinique, France
- Alma mater: Naval Military Academy
- Military career
- Allegiance: Spain
- Branch: Spanish Navy
- Service years: 1873–1899
- Rank: Teniente de navío
- Commands: Diego Velázquez
- Conflicts: Third Carlist War; Spanish-American War: Santiago campaign; Action of 13 June 1898

Juan Manuel de Carranza Fernández de la Reguera (January 30, 1857 – February 5, 1899) was a Spanish ship-of-the-line lieutenant. He was known for commanding the Diego Velázquez during the Action of 13 June 1898 of the Spanish-American War.

== Origin ==
Juan was born on January 30, 1857, as the son of Vice Admiral José Juan de Carranza y de Echevarría who hailed from Nerja, Málaga Captain General of the Department of Ferrol while his mother was Carmen Fernández de la Reguera y González de la Pola who hailed from Santander, Cantabria. He was the eldest out of five children as his brothers Ramón and Fernando would join Juan in the navy, his brother José Ignacio joining the Spanish Marine Infantry and his sister Blanca would marry Juan Cisneros. His paternal grandparents were Juan Manuel De Carranza y Terol who hailed from Andratx and Anastasia de Echevarría y Maiz who hailed from Salvatierra, Alava. His maternal grandparents were Ignacio Reguera y Pillado who was also from Ferrol Clara González de la Pola who hailed from A Coruña.

== Early Military Career ==
De Carranza enrolled in the Naval Military Academy on January 15, 1873, aboard the Asturias across the Ria of Ferrol. He was then made 2nd Midshipman upon his graduation in 1875 as well as receiving the Red Cross of Naval Merit, 1st Class for his service throughout the Third Carlist War. In 1878, he was promoted to 1st Midshipman and to Ensign on February 8, 1879. In 1880, he was awarded the Medal of Alfonso XII and given the title of "Benemérito de la Patria" along with a promotion to captain in 1883 and awarded the Red Cross of Military Merit, 1st Class. On May 10, De Carranza embarked in the Gravina until he was sent to Ferrol on September 22. After being promoted to Lieutenant on September 15, 1885, he enrolled in the Torpedo School at Cartagena. He then embarked the Castilla by the next year before transferring to the Reina Regente in October 10. In 1888, he received the Medalla de la Campaña de Cuba and on June 11, he took office as the interim secretary to his father who was the General Commander in the Staff of the Instruction Squad.

On September 4, 1890, he joined the Escuela Naval Flotante as a language teacher aboard the Asturias at Ferrol where he remained until his appointment on August 8, 1891, as the commander of the Villa de Bilbao and on December 12, 1891, he returned to the Escuela Naval Flotante as a teacher. De Carranza would then be appointed as a military observer of the First Sino-Japanese War as he would take lessons from the Battle of the Yalu River.

== Scandal at Ferrol ==
In August 1895, his father was forced to be an arbitrator in a scandal at Ferrol after the warship Infanta María Teresa arrived at the port of Ferrol after a long journey but would break down off the coast. José de Carranza proposed that the ship sent to be repaired in Bilbao which was ratified by the Government. Protests soon arose from the crew's relatives for what it meant spending more time without seeing their relatives on board. This would lead to violent reactions, organizing to storm the ship and then from the City Council itself for what they considered an affront to the economic interests of the shipyards, resigning the councilors and creating a Defense Board, which would later be imprisoned. In October, El Correo Gallego reported on a rally organized by the Defense Board, created to oppose the transfer of the ship Infanta María Teresa to the Bilbao shipyards for repairs, a decision that for the people of Ferrol it was considered a very serious affront. The upset would expand to the crew as some sailors caused an upset and led to a fight between Juan De Carranzaand the director of the Ferrol newspaper who acted in self-defense. The account of the events, according to the newspaper itself, is as follows:

At seven thirty at night (day 10) when the work for today's number was finished, our beloved director D. Ceferino Doce Punín was conversing in this Newsroom with Messrs. Becerra Armesto, González Cal and Abizanda, he appeared visibly agitated D. Juan De Carranza, son of the Captain General of the Department, and stated addressing Mr. Abizanda that what was reported in the last of the two transcribed paragraphs was inaccurate. "Who is the author of that?" Don Doce." And without saying another word, De Carranza raised a cane that he had been equipped with, unloading it on the director, who in turn, taking hold of one of the canes that were nearby, "responded to the aggression with aggression and the taunts and mortifying qualifications, with the language that was typical of the case.

== Spanish-American War ==
Between 1897 and his death, De Carranza was credit for his contributions in the Spanish magazine "El mundo naval ilustrado". Later in April 1897, he received command of the gunboat Diego Velázquez which was located in Cienfuegos where he carried out several convoy escort services with troops and supplies along the southern Cuban coast, circumventing the American blockade which was at great risk given the negligible military value of the naval forces under his command compared to the vastly superior American forces. On June 1, 1898, he entered Cienfuegos, evading enemy surveillance once more. He was at said base, when on June 13, 1898, he was ordered to go out to reconnoiter a steamer near the port, thinking that it was a ship breaking through the blockade known as the Purísima Concepción. Prepared for the worst and after disembarking the wooden objects and defending the crews with sacks of coal, the Diego Velázquez left the port.

Despite the American forces outnumbering the Spanish, De Carranza took advantage of the shorter turning radius of his gunboat to always fire upon the smallest possible target and use most of his cannons and prevent the enemy from doing so. After 69 minutes, the Diego Velázquez re-entered Cienfuegos after having fired 193 projectiles, some of which visibly hit their targets, causing a small fire to their enemy, several casualties and causing them to suspend fire for a few moments. On her part, the gunboat had also received some impact, causing six injuries. De Carranza would later head out again, this time together with the boats Lince and Cometa which caused the USS Yankee to withdraw. The small gunboat would give a fiecrce fight to the point where the American Commander Willard H. Brownson mistook it for the Galicia, a ship nearly three times larger than the Diego Velázquez.

The next day, De Carranza gave the following address to his crew:

Never forget June 13, 1898; God was with us; educate your children in sentiments of devotion to duty, blind faith in discipline and enthusiastic love for the Fatherland; it is loyal advice given to you by your grateful Commander.

== Death and Burial ==
After the war had concluded, the Diego Velázquez would set sail to the French overseas department of Martinique as part of its return journey to the Spanish mainland but the gunboat wouldn't make it as around this time, the ship was sold to the Venezuelan Navy and De Carranza would die on February 5, 1899, while at Fort-de-France from declining health. He would have a funeral there with most of the stores closing that day out of respect. His remains would be reinterred by the Cabo Sillero to Ferrol on either June 23 or June 24 and be buried there.
