= John Hubbard (admiral) =

United States admiral

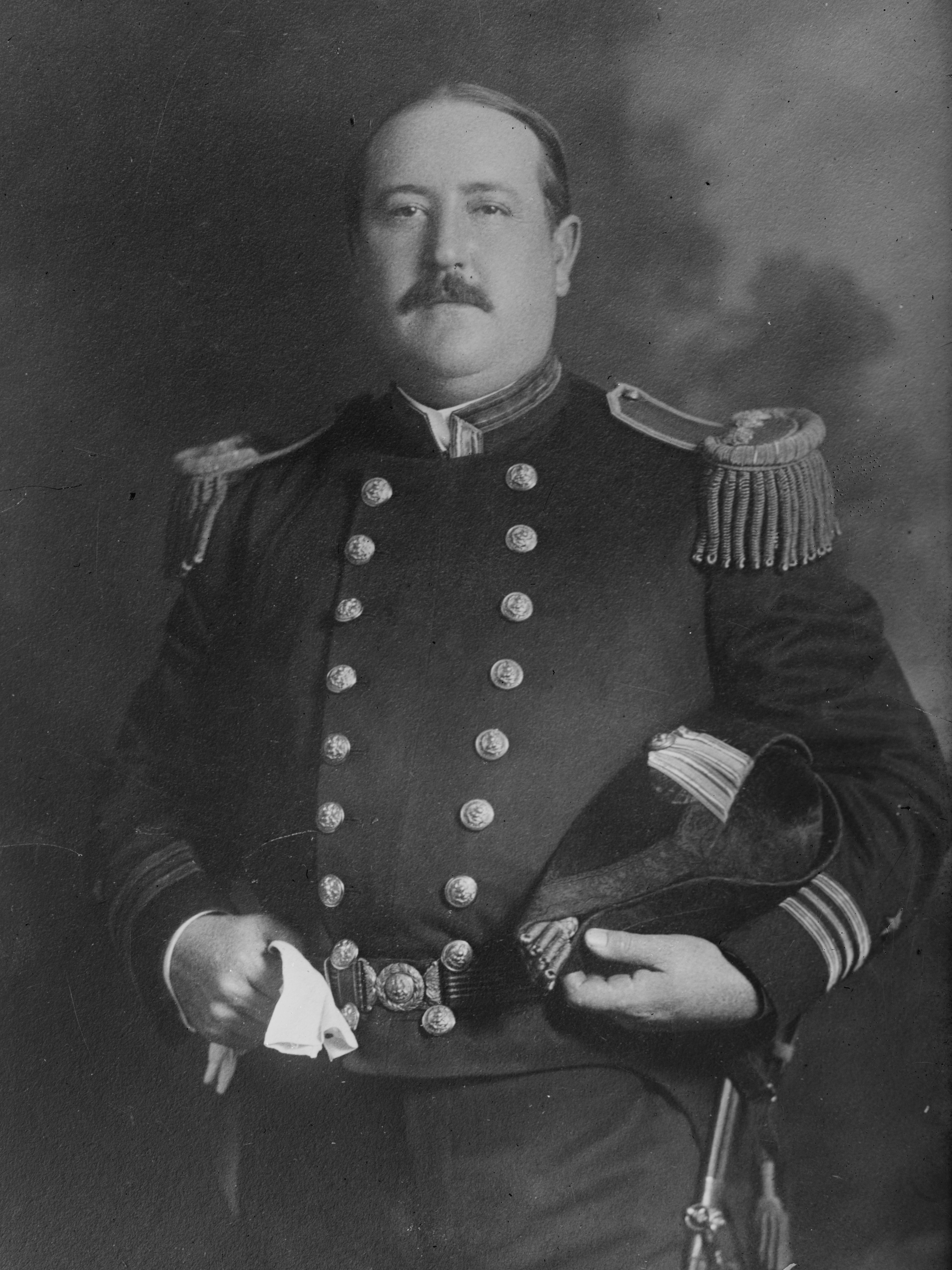
- Born: 19 May 1849; South Berwick, Maine, U.S.
- Died: 28 May 1932 (aged 83); Washington, D.C., U.S.
- Military career
- Allegiance: United States of America
- Branch: United States Navy
- Service years: 1870–1911
- Rank: Rear Admiral
- Commands: USS Nashville (PG-7); USS Minnesota (BB-22); 3rd Division, United States Pacific Fleet; United States Asiatic Fleet
- Conflicts: Spanish–American War; Battle of Guantánamo Bay; Action off Casilda; Action off Cienfuegos; Banana Wars; Separation of Panama from Colombia

Rear Admiral John Hubbard (19 May 1849 – 28May 1932) was an officer in the United States Navy. He fought in the Spanish–American War, played a prominent role in the independence of Panama from Colombia in 1903, and served as Commander-in-Chief of the United States Asiatic Fleet.

== Naval career ==
Hubbard was born in South Berwick, Maine, on 19 May 1849, the son of John Hubbard and the former Eleanor Augusta Tucker, and entered the United States Naval Academy on 27 July 1866. While there, he led the Academy's rowing team to victory in 1870, serving as stroke oar on a Navy crew. He graduated on 7 June 1870.

Hubbard served aboard the sloop-of-war USS Brooklyn on the European Station from 1871 to 1874, being promoted to ensign on 13 July 1871 and to master on 15 September 1873. He was assigned to the United States Coast Survey from 1874 to 1877, then served on special duty aboard the steamer USS Supply from 1877 to 1879 – being promoted to lieutenant on 28 December 1878 – before moving to the Asiatic Station for duty aboard the sloop-of-war USS Swatara from 1879 to 1883.

After duty at the Naval Torpedo Station in Newport, Rhode Island, in 1883, Hubbard served at the Bureau of Navigation in Washington, D.C., from 1883 to 1884. He was on lighthouse duty from 1884 to 1886, then on special duty at the United States Department of the Navy from 1887 to 1888.

Hubbard returned to sea in 1889 aboard the protected cruiser USS Chicago in the Squadron of Evolution, serving aboard her until July 1892 when he became Inspector of Ordnance. Leaving that duty in July 1895, he was assigned to the training ship USS Essex.

On the eve of the Spanish–American War, Hubbard left Essex and reported aboard the auxiliary cruiser USS Yankee, then fitting out at New York City, in March 1898. Yankee was commissioned on 14 April 1898, and during the Spanish–American War participated in the blockade of Cuba, the Battle of Guantánamo Bay, and actions off Casilda and Cienfuegos. After the war, Hubbard left Yankee in October 1898 and was promoted to lieutenant commander on 6 October 1898.

Hubbard's next duty was as ordnance officer at the New York Navy Yard in Brooklyn, New York, from November 1898 until January 1900, when he began a tour aboard the monitor USS Amphitrite, which was serving as a gunnery training ship. In February 1901 he left Amphitrite to begin a second tour on lighthouse duty. He was promoted to commander in April 1901.

By November 1903, Hubbard was the commanding officer of the gunboat USS Nashville operating off the Isthmus of Panama. He played a prominent role in blocking interference by Colombian troops in the separation of Panama from Colombia that month, and was noted for his leadership in preventing European countries, particularly the German Empire, from asserting authority in Panama as it became an independent country.

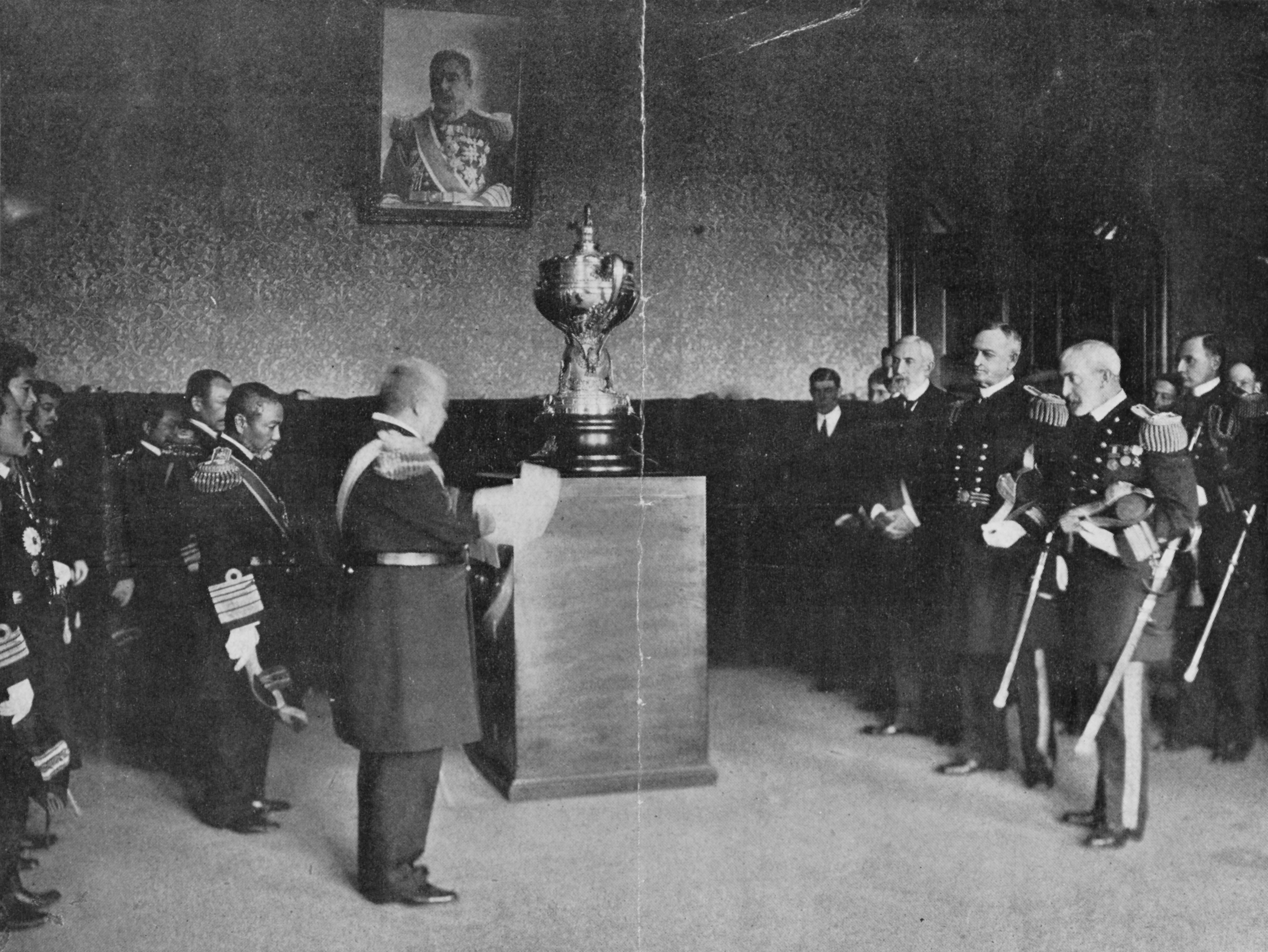
Hubbard (right foreground) presents a loving cup to the Imperial Japanese Navy on behalf of the U.S. Atlantic Fleet in Tokyo, Japan, in January 1910 in recognition of the courtesy extended to the "Great White Fleet" during its October 1908 visit to Japan

Promoted to captain on 8 July 1905, Hubbard became the first commanding officer of the battleship USS Minnesota when she was commissioned on 9 March 1907. He commanded Minnesota during her duties related to the Jamestown Exposition in Norfolk, Virginia, from 22 April 1907 to 3 September 1907 and during her voyage around the world as part of the "Great White Fleet" between 16 December 1907 and 22 February 1909.

Hubbard later performed special duty at the Department of the Navy and served as a member of the General Board of the United States Navy, and was promoted to rear admiral on 25 October 1909. He was serving as Commander, 3rd Division, United States Pacific Fleet, when he visited Tokyo, Japan, in January 1910 to present a loving cup to the Imperial Japanese Navy on behalf of the United States Atlantic Fleet in recognition of the courtesy Japan had extended to the "Great White Fleet" during its visit to Japan in October 1908; Japanese Admiral Saitō Makoto accepted the cup as a number of dignitaries – including Admiral Heihachiro Togo and United States Ambassador to Japan Thomas J. O'Brien – looked on. Hubbard became Commander-in-Chief of the United States Asiatic Fleet on 16 February 1910.

Relinquishing command of the Asiatic Fleet on 16 May 1911, Hubbard retired from the Navy upon reaching the mandatory retirement age of 62 on 19 May 1911. He died in Washington, D.C., on 30 May 1932.

== Commemoration ==
Hubbard Hall, also known as "The Boat House," on Dorsey Creek at the U.S. Naval Academy in Annapolis, Maryland, is named for Hubbard. It is the home of the Academy's rowing teams. Opened in 1930, it was the first building at the Academy to be named after a living person.

== See also ==
- Great White Fleet
- History of Panama
- Separation of Panama from Colombia
- United States Asiatic Fleet
- USS Minnesota (BB-22)

== Notes ==
Military offices
Preceded by Willard H. Brownson*	Commander-in-Chief, United States Asiatic Fleet; 19 February 1910 – 16 May 1911	Succeeded by Joseph B. Murdock
