= William Jewett Tenney =

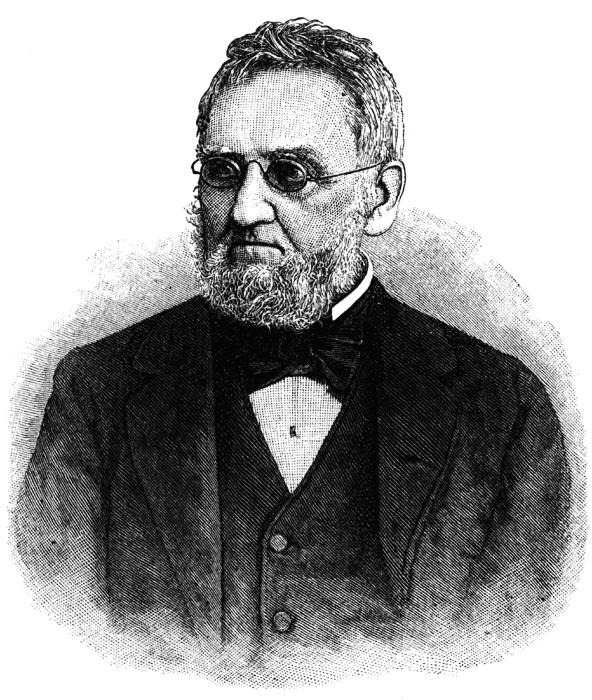
- Born: 1814; Newport, Rhode Island
- Died: September 20, 1883 (aged 68–69); Newark, New Jersey
- Occupations: American author, editor and encyclopedist
- Spouse: Sarah Brownson

William Jewett Tenney (1814 at Newport, Rhode Island – 20 September 1883, at Newark, New Jersey) was an American author, editor and encyclopedist.

== Life ==
Graduating from Yale University in 1832 he studied medicine, but abandoned it for the law and, on being admitted to the bar, opened an office in New York. He then tried journalism on the editorial staff of the Journal of Commerce, and contributed editorially to the Evening Post, during 1841-43 and 1847–48.

In 1853 he entered the service of D. Appleton & Company, publishers, as editor, and, in addition to a large amount of literary and critical work, began for them, in 1861, the compilation of the Annual Cyclopædia which he continued till his death.

During a long residence at Elizabeth, New Jersey, he held several local public offices including that of collector of the port during James Buchanan's presidential administration. He became a convert to the Catholic faith and married, as his second wife, Sarah Brownson, daughter of Orestes A. Brownson.

== Works ==
He indexed T. H. Benton's "Abridgment of the Debates of Congress" and added a sixteenth volume to the series (New York 1857–60). He edited the "Queens of England" (1852); and wrote a "Military and Naval History of the Rebellion in the U. S." (1865), and a "Grammatical Analysis" (1866).
