= Santo Domingo Affair =

Military incident in the Dominican Republic involving the United States

Coordinates: 18.4764°N 69.8933°W

- Part of the Banana Wars
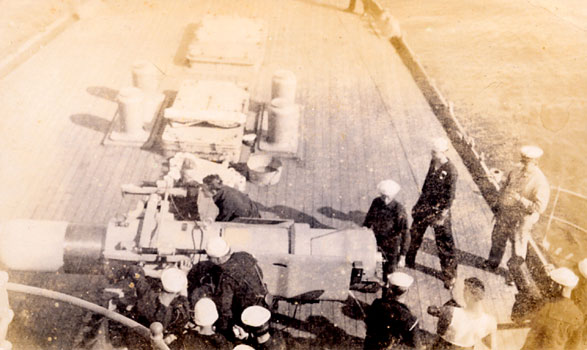
- "After the first shot has been fired. USS Columbia"
Date	1 February 1904 – 11 February 1904 (1 week and 3 days)
Location	Santo Domingo, Dominican Republic, Caribbean Sea
Result	American victory

Belligerents
United States	Dominican Republic

Commanders and leaders
(United States) Richard Wainwright (United States) Albert S. Mclemore	(Dominican Republic) Carlos Morales Languasco (Dominican Republic) Juan Isidro Jimenes

Strength
Land: 80 marines 250 sailors Sea: 2 protected cruisers 1 auxiliary cruiser 1 steamship	100 militia 1 fort

Casualties and losses
1 killed 1 wounded 1 steamer damaged 1 launch damaged	Unknown; 1 fort captured

The Santo Domingo Affair, or the Santo Domingo Crisis, refers to an incident from 1 February 1904 to 11 February 1904 involving the United States and Dominican militia forces in the Dominican Republic. After the death of a seaman from the USS Yankee on February 1, the U.S. military launched a punitive expedition which routed the Dominican forces.

== Background ==
During the Banana Wars era, revolution in Central America was widespread. In order to protect American citizens and their interests in these war zones, the United States Navy patrolled the hostile coasts. Rebels in the city of Santo Domingo had previously fired on two American merchant ships and damaged property at the American-owned sugar cane plantations. USS Detroit had also landed sailors and marines beginning in November 1903, but they were withdrawn when the situation appeared stable. On February 1, 1904, the auxiliary cruiser USS Yankee was on patrol off Santo Domingo, observing the fighting between government and rebel troops loyal to Carlos F. Morales and General Juan Isidro Jiminez. The American captain decided to put some men in a launch and send them ashore to make contact with the Dominicans, but when it drew away from Yankee the insurgents attacked it with small arms fire and Seaman J. C. Johnston was mortally wounded. In response, President Theodore Roosevelt ordered the protected cruisers USS Columbia and USS Newark to proceed to the islands and exact an apology. The temporary commander of the Brazil Squadron, Captain Richard Wainwright, was placed in charge of the operation on board the Newark.

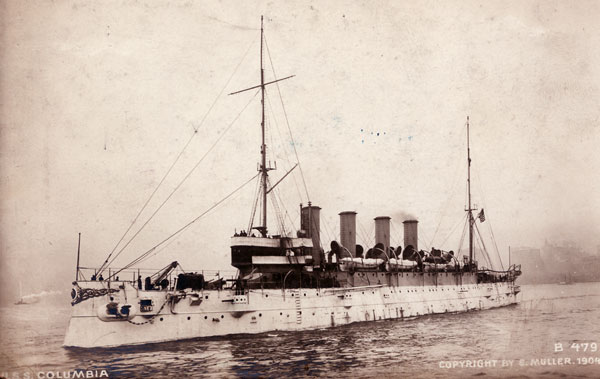
USS Columbia in 1904

== Incident ==
Wainwright arrived at Santo Domingo on the 10 February, finding that the USS Columbia had arrived on 8 February. The Columbia was under the command of Captain James M. Miller who was senior to Wainwright. Miller was anchored near the SS New York, one of the merchant ships attacked in November 1903 by the Dominican cruiser Presidente. On February 11, the launch from the Columbia, flying the American flag, was sent in toward the docks escorting the New York whose crew intended to offload their cargo. As they did so, the insurgents violated a pre-established armistice by opening fire with their small arms. Several shots hit the steamer and a few grazed the navy launch but there were no casualties. The two American vessels withdrew. Wainwright, having informed his superiors and gotten their approval, launched an amphibious assault and naval bombardment after first warning the American consul and civilians living in the city. Newark opened fire with her broadside at 3:25 pm, while the Columbia covered the landing. Ten minutes later the bombardment ceased and a force of 375 Americans headed to the beach. The landing party was under the direct command of Lieutenant Commander James P. Parker, the executive officer on the Columbia; the marines were led by Captain Albert S. Mclemore.

At least 100 armed rebels were using the old Fort Ozama as a base. The Americans received some enemy rifle fire while still on the water and when they landed at 4:30 pm, they attacked and routed the rebels. When the men on board Columbia observed the gunfire, Captain Wainwright ordered his gunners to open fire until 4:47, though the Newark continued the attack until 5:00. With the battle over, the Americans returned to their ships between 9:00 and 10:00 pm. Morales, Jiminez, and Wainwright signed another armistice and later a peace treaty which ended the hostilities. Only one American was hurt in the engagement when he accidentally fired his revolver into his foot; Dominican casualties are not known. The United States Marine Corps maintains a small cemetery in Santo Domingo. Seaman Johnston was the first to be buried there, followed by other men killed on the island during the Banana Wars.

The coffin and the American force that was to pay military honors to the body were brought from the cruiser U.S.S. Yankee" in four of its boats towed by a steam launch.

At the dock, the procession was arranged as follows: Four officers from the Military Quarters of the President of the Republic; the Yankee's brass band; two sections of American marines; an American flag with crape; the coffin, carried on the shoulders of four sailors; a sea force of about sixty men, among whom were several of African descent.

== See also ==
- Mary Carver Affair
- Rio de Janeiro Affair
- First Sumatran Expedition
- Second Sumatran Expedition
- First Fiji Expedition
- Second Fiji Expedition
- Formosa Expedition

== Sources ==
- Ellsworth, Harry A. (1974). One Hundred Eight Landings of United States Marines 1800-1934. Washington D.C.: US Marines History and Museums Division.
- Rodríguez, Roberto (2025). The Santo Domingo Affair, 1904. La primera Intervención Militar de EE. UU. en República Dominicana. Dominican Republic: Municipedia.
