= James P. Parker =

United States Navy admiral (1855–1942)

- Born: 25 September 1855 near Enfield, North Carolina, US
- Died: 18 January 1942 (aged 86)
- Burial place: United States Naval Academy Cemetery
- Military career
- Allegiance: United States of America
- Branch: United States Navy
- Service years: 1877–1912; 1917–1919
- Rank: Commodore
- Commands: USS Florida (BM-9); USS Hancock (AP-3); Acting President of the Naval War College
- Conflicts: Spanish–American War; Philippine–American War; Banana Wars; Santo Domingo Affair; World War I

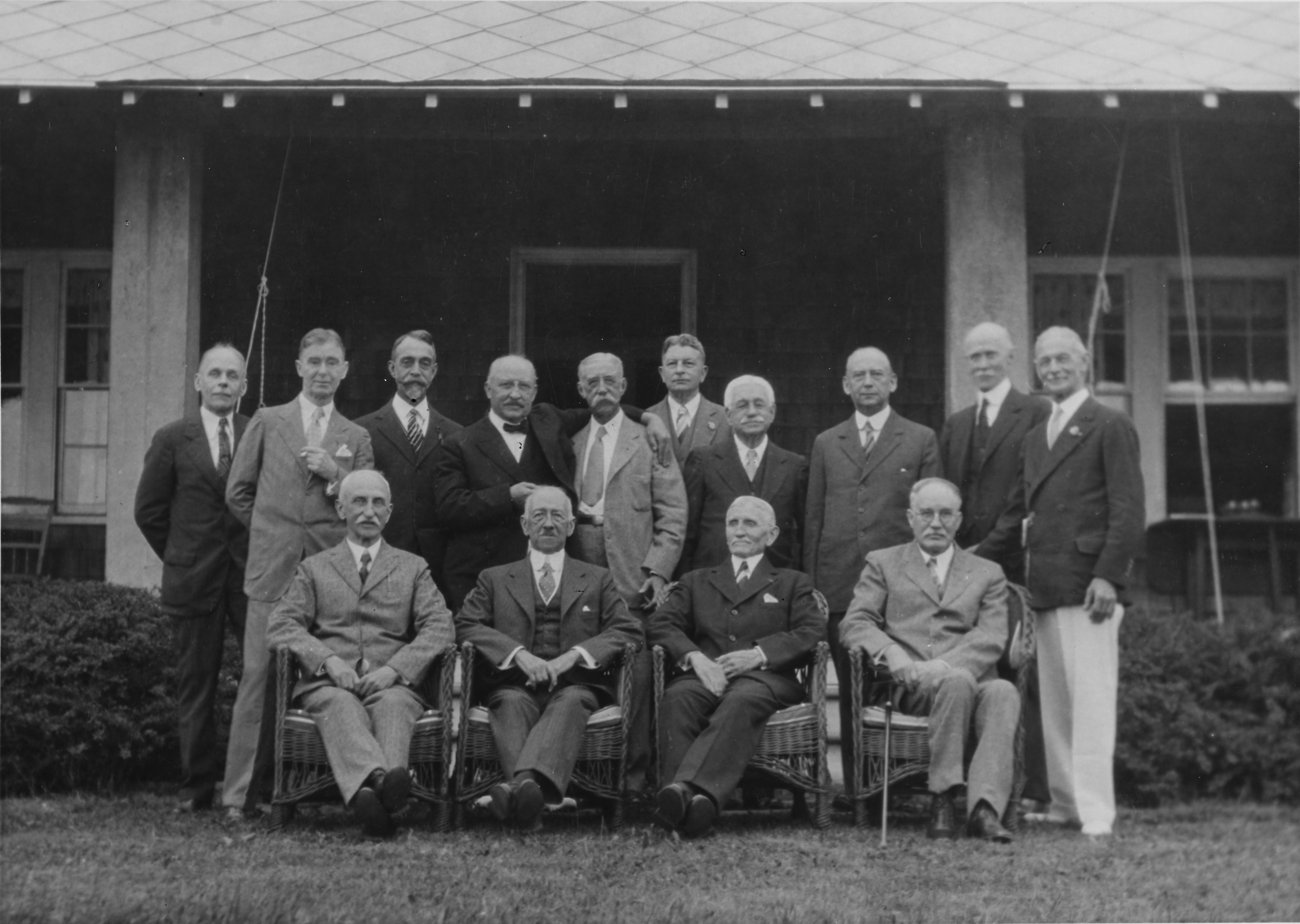
Parker is standing second from right in this photo of retired admirals and other retirees taken at the home of Rear Admiral Spencer S. Wood at Jamestown, Rhode Island, on 7 August 1928.

Commodore James Philips Parker (25 September 1855 – 18 January 1942) was a United States Navy officer. His career included service in the Spanish–American War, the Philippine–American War, and the Santo Domingo Affair, and he was recalled from retirement to serve as an Acting President of the Naval War College during World War I.

== Early life ==
Parker was born on 25 September 1855 near Enfield, North Carolina, where his parents owned a plantation. He was the second of nine children of Francis Marion "Frank" Parker and the former Sarah Tart "Sally" Philips. His father fought on the Confederate side during the American Civil War from 1861 until forced out of service by a wound in May 1864, mostly as a colonel commanding the 30th North Carolina Regiment.

== Naval career ==
Parker entered the United States Naval Academy at Annapolis, Maryland, as a cadet midshipman on 5 June 1873 and graduated on 18 June 1877. His first assignment was aboard the flagship of the South Atlantic Squadron, the screw sloop-of-war USS Hartford, from 1877 to 1879, after which he stood for his final examination and completed his studies. He then served aboard the screw sloop-of-war USS Swatara in the Asiatic Squadron from 1879 to 1882, and was promoted to ensign while aboard her on 10 January 1881.

Parker next spent several years on hydrographic work. He began with duty aboard survey ships of the United States Coast and Geodetic Survey for surveying work along the United States East Coast, first aboard USC&GS Endeavor in 1883 and then on USC&GS A. D. Bache from 1883 to 1884. He then served aboard the U.S. Navy survey ship USS Ranger for additional surveying work along the United States West Coast from 1884 to 1887. Promoted to lieutenant, junior grade, on 30 June 1887, his next assignment was to the Branch Hydrographic Office in Baltimore, Maryland, from 1887 to 1890.

From October 1890 to October 1893, Parker was aboard the gunboat USS Alert, operating in the Bering Sea and in the Asiatic Squadron, and he was promoted to lieutenant on 25 January 1893 while aboard her. He returned to the Naval Academy to serve as an instructor from October 1893 to 1896, then reported aboard the new monitor USS Monadnock in the Pacific Squadron in July 1896. After the outbreak of the Spanish–American War in April 1898, Monadnock was ordered to the Philippine Islands to reinforce the Asiatic Squadron there, and departed San Francisco, California, on 23 June 1898 for a voyage across the Pacific Ocean, stopping in Hawaii in early July before arriving in Manila Bay on 16 August 1898 at the close of the war and commencing blockade duty there.

Leaving Monadnock in December 1898, Parker transferred to the gunboat USS Petrel in January 1899, seeing action against Filipino insurgents during the Philippine–American War. He left Petrel in August 1899 and was assigned to the hospital ship USS Solace in September 1899, on which he returned to the United States in October 1899. He began another tour as an instructor at the Naval Academy on 19 October 1899 and was promoted to lieutenant commander on 30 June 1900.

On 11 June 1902, Parker reported for duty in the Atlantic Training Squadron aboard the auxiliary cruiser and troop transport USS Panther. By November 1903 he had transferred to the protected cruiser USS Columbia in the same squadron as her executive officer. During his tour aboard Columbia, he took part in the Santo Domingo Affair when he led a landing party ashore in Santo Domingo in the Dominican Republic on 11 February 1904 to join another landing party from the protected cruiser USS Newark and gunfire from the ships themselves in quelling unrest in the city. Detaching from Columbia in March 1905, he was promoted to commander on 1 July 1905, and on 14 October 1905 he began a tour as equipment and ordnance officer at the Portsmouth Navy Yard in Kittery, Maine. On 27 August 1907, he became commanding officer of the monitor USS Florida, then in reserve and used for training activities but activated from May to July 1908 for ordnance tests of superfiring gun turrets.

Promoted to captain on 1 July 1909, Parker became the captain of the yard at the Norfolk Navy Yard in Portsmouth, Virginia, on 24 August 1909. On 27 December 1911, he took command of the troop transport USS Hancock, with additional duty on the general court martial at the New York Navy Yard in Brooklyn, New York.

Parker retired from the Navy as a commodore on 30 June 1912.

After the United States entered World War I in April 1917, Parker was recalled to active duty. He served as acting president of the Naval War College in Newport, Rhode Island, from 21 November 1917 to 17 March 1919, the second of three acting presidents to oversee the college while its academic activities were shut down for the war between April 1917 and April 1919.

== Personal life ==
Parker was married to the former Mary McPherson (29 August 1862 – 16 July 1937).

== Death ==
Parker died on 18 January 1942 and is buried with his wife at the United States Naval Academy Cemetery in Annapolis, Maryland.
