= 1954 Ashland Eagles football team =

American college football season

1954 Ashland Eagles football

MOL champion
- Conference: Mid-Ohio League
- Record: 7–0 (4–0 MOL)
- Head coach: Robert Brownson (1st season)
- Home stadium: Myers Field

1954 Mid-Ohio League football standings
	Conf.					Overall
Team	W		L		T	W		L		T
Ashland $	4	–	0	–	0	7	–	0	–	0
Findlay	3	–	2	–	0	3	–	4	–	0
Wilmington (OH)	1	–	1	–	0	4	–	3	–	0
Bluffton	2	–	2	–	0	4	–	4	–	0
Defiance	2	–	3	–	0	4	–	4	–	0
Ohio Northern	0	–	4	–	0	1	–	7	–	0
$ – Conference champion

The 1954 Ashland Eagles football team was an American football team that represented Ashland University as a member of the Mid-Ohio League (MOL) during the 1954 college football season. In their first year under head coach Robert Brownson, the Eagles compiled a perfect 7–0 record (4–0 in conference games), won the MOL championship, and outscored opponents by a total of 119 to 28.

The team played its home games at Myers Field and Redwood Stadium in Ashland, Ohio.

== Schedule ==
Date	Opponent	Site	Result	Attendance	Source
September 25	Kenyon	Myers Field; Ashland, OH	W 40–0	4,000	
October 2	at Ohio Northern	Ada, OH	W 13–0		
October 9	Slippery Rock	Redwood Stadium; Ashland, OH	W 21–6	3,500	
October 16	Indiana Central	Myers Field; Ashland, OH	W 6–0	2,500	
October 23	Bluffton^{†}	Myers Field; Ashland, OH	W 7–0	5,000	
October 30	Findlay	Myers Field; Ashland, OH	W 19–13	3,500	
November 6	at Defiance	Defiance, OH	W 13–9		
^{†}Homecoming
