= Hubbard Hall (Annapolis, Maryland) =

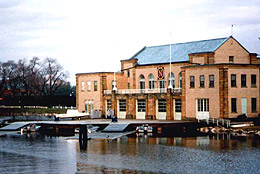
- Interactive map of the Hubbard Hall area

General information
- Location: Annapolis, Maryland, United States
- Coordinates: 38.9865007°N 76.4932942°W
- Construction started: 1929
- Completed: 1930

Design and construction
- Architect: Bureau of Yards and Docks

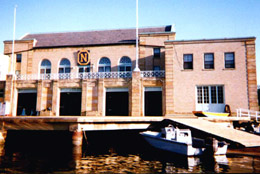

Hubbard Hall, often called "The Boat House," is the historic home of the United States Naval Academy's rowing teams in Annapolis, Maryland. Located on Dorsey Creek, off of the Severn River, it was completed in 1930 for the 40-man heavyweight rowing team. It supports the men's lightweight and heavyweight teams and the women's team with over 200 members. The Academy is in the process of completing a new US$20 million renovation of the entire building including the rowing tank.

Funds for the building were appropriated in 1928, construction began in 1929 and was completed in 1930. The building was designed by architects in the Bureau of Yards and Docks under Rear Admiral Luther E. Gregory.

Hubbard Hall is named for Rear Admiral John Hubbard (1849-1932), a member of the Naval Academy's Class of 1870 who as stroke led a Navy crew to victory in 1870. The Hall was the first building at the Academy to be named after a living person.

== See also ==
- USNA #Halls and principal buildings
- Navy Midshipmen#Facilities
