= Brownson Islands =

Islands in Antarctica

Coordinates: 74°10′S 103°36′W

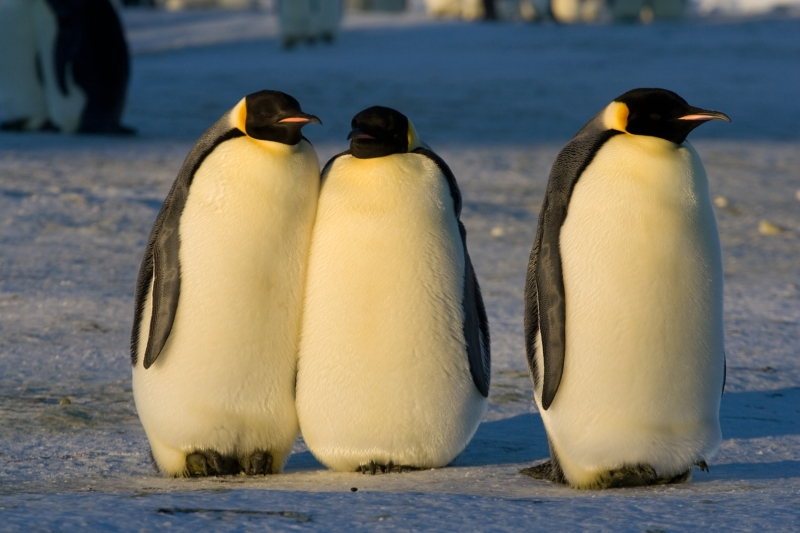
Emperor penguins breed in the IBA

The Brownson Islands are a group of about 20 small islands which lie just outside the entrance to Cranton Bay, about 14 nautical miles (26 km) southwest of the southwest tip of the Canisteo Peninsula. They comprises four main islands surrounded by manysmaller islets and rocks, and are largely ice-free in summer. They were delineated from aerial photographs taken by U.S. Navy Operation Highjump in December 1946, and named by the Advisory Committee on Antarctic Names for the USS Brownson, a vessel of the eastern task group of this expedition.

== Important Bird Area ==
The islands have been identified as a 792 ha Important Bird Area (IBA) by BirdLife International because they support breeding colonies of emperor penguins (containing about 6,000 individuals, in an estimate based on 2009 satellite imagery) and Adélie penguins (some 16,000 pairs, from 2011 satellite imagery).

== See also ==
- List of Antarctic and sub-Antarctic islands
