= Sarah Brownson =

Sarah Mary Brownson (June 7, 1839, Chelsea, Massachusetts – October 30, 1876, Elizabeth, New Jersey) was an American writer.

She was the daughter of Orestes A. Brownson and the wife of William J. Tenney, whom she married in 1873. She and Tenney had two daughters: Ruth Channing Tenney and Mary Brownson Tenney.

== Works ==
She is best known for her Life of Demetrius Augustine Gallitzin, Prince and Priest (F. Pustet & Co,, New York, 1873, Didier & Cie., París, 1880).

She wrote literary criticism for her father's "Review", and many articles, stories, and poems which appeared mainly in Catholic magazines. Other works included:

- Marian Elwood, or How Girls Live (E. Dunigan, New York, 1859, D. & J. Sadlier & Co., New York, 1863, 1866, P.J. Kenedy, New York, 18--)
- At Anchor; a story of our Civil War (D. Appleton and Co., New York, 1865)
- "Heremore Brandon; or the Fortunes of a Newsboy" (The Catholic World, 1869).
