= USS Brownson (DD-518) =

Fletcher-class destroyer

Coordinates: 5°20′S 148°25′E

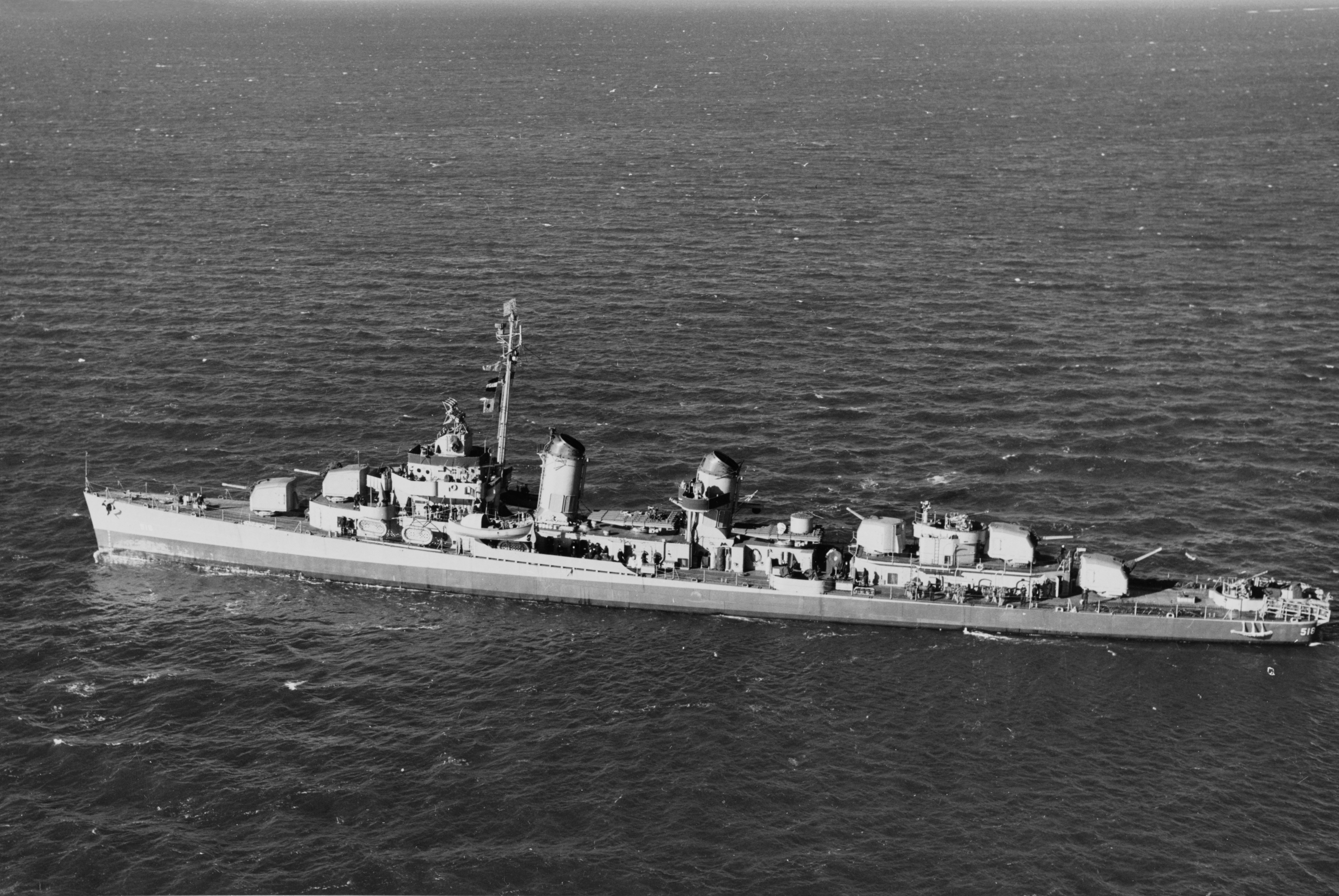
- Brownson in early 1943

History

United States
- Namesake: Willard H. Brownson
- Builder: Bethlehem Mariners Harbor, Staten Island, New York
- Laid down: 15 February 1942
- Launched: 24 September 1942
- Commissioned: 3 February 1943
- Honours and awards: 1 Battle Star
- Fate: Sunk by Japanese aircraft off Cape Gloucester on 26 December 1943

General characteristics
- Class & type: Fletcher-class destroyer
- Displacement: 2,050 tons
- Length: 376 ft 6 in (114.7 m)
- Beam: 39 ft 8 in (12.1 m)
- Draft: 17 ft 9 in (5.4 m)
- Propulsion: 60,000 shp (45 MW); 2 propellers
- Speed: 35 knots (65 km/h; 40 mph)
- Range: 6500 nmi. (12,000 km) at 15 kt
- Complement: 336
- Armament: 5 × single Mk 12 5 in (127 mm)/38 guns; 5 × twin 40 mm (1.6 in) Bofors AA guns; 7 × single 20 mm (0.8 in) Oerlikon AA guns; 2 × quintuple 21 in (533 mm) torpedo tubes; 6 × single depth charge throwers; 2 × depth charge racks

USS Brownson (DD-518) was a Fletcher-class destroyer of the United States Navy commissioned on 3 February 1943. She was sunk by Japanese aircraft off Cape Gloucester, New Britain on 26 December 1943.

== Construction ==
Brownson was the first ship of the U.S. Navy to be named for Rear Admiral Willard H. Brownson (1846–1935). She was also the first of the Fletcher class to be built with a "square-bridge" configuration, which allowed greater all-around visibility than the earlier ships of the class, which had a "round bridge" or "high bridge" configuration.

Brownson was launched on 24 September 1942 by Bethlehem Steel Co., Staten Island, N.Y., sponsored by Mrs. Cleland S. Baxter, granddaughter of Admiral Brownson.

== Operational history ==
Commissioned on 3 February 1943, at the New York Navy Yard, Brooklyn, N.Y., the new destroyer fitted out there. Shortly thereafter, on 14 February, the steamship Pearson struck Brownson while she was loading ammunition at Gravesend Bay, Long Island, N.Y., in preparation for shakedown training. Fortunately, the collision only resulted in superficial damage and the destroyer proceeded on her shakedown cruise to Guantanamo Bay, Cuba, after undergoing a brief inspection.

Brownson concluded training off Cuba on 17 March 1943, and steamed for the New York Navy Yard, where she arrived on 20 March for post-shakedown availability, after which she spent a month transiting between New York, Cape Cod Bay and Buzzards Bay, Mass., Casco Bay, Maine, Norfolk, Va., and Melville, R.I. During this time, she conducted anti-submarine patrols and participated in various antiaircraft drills and gunnery exercises.

On 21 April 1943, Brownson received orders to participate in the search for the crew of a Consolidated B-24 Liberator that had crashed off the coast of Md., in the approximate position of 38°15' N, 79°18' W. The ocean tug USCGC Carrabassett (WAT-55) relieved her of search duties the following day and she steamed for New York.

Brownson shifted to Bayonne, N.J., on 28 April 1943, to commence deperming and returned to New York that evening. Early the next morning, she joined an anti-submarine screen with convoy UGF-8 as part of Task Force (TF) 67 and departed for Casablanca, French Morocco.

On the morning of 3 May 1943, while steaming to Casablanca, Brownson received orders from her screen commander to assist in the search for the two-man crew of a Vought OS2N-1 Kingfisher (BuNo 01507) whose aircraft had capsized while attempting to land astern of the battleship Texas (BB-35). She quickly changed course and proceeded at flank speed to screen Thatcher (DD-514), Carmick (DD-493) and the oiler Merrimack (AO-37) as they patrolled the vicinity where the OS2N had overturned. After locating and rescuing both men, Lt. (j.g.) W. A. Turner and RM1/c T.J. Vaughan, Brownson, Thatcher, Carmick, and Merrimack rejoined UGF-8.

Nearly three and a half hours later, an accident that occurred during an attempted underway replenishment resulted in another emergency. At 1453 on 3 May 1943, Brownson maneuvered to take a position astern of Merrimack and received from the oiler a towing line messenger with a fuel hose unit. The messenger was too large to fit through the snatch block and had to be cleared. Lt. Harry L. Champlain, D-V(G), stepped outboard of the messenger just before the snatch block cleared and a heavy strain in the line snapped it forward and up over the towing bit, catching the officer behind the knees and knocking him overboard on the port side. Brownson and Merrimack each threw two life buoys into the water and contacted Thatcher via low frequency voice radio (TBS) to request assistance with a search and rescue operation. The three ships searched for Lt. Champlain for more than half an hour but failed to locate him. After making the difficult decision to end their rescue efforts, Brownson resumed replenishing, and the ships returned to their stations in the convoy.

Shortly after 0600 on 10 May 1943, in accordance with orders from the Commander of Task Force (CTF) 67, the ships of UGF-8 reduced speed and commenced dividing into Convoys I and II. Convoy II received orders to steam for Point Europa, Gibraltar, U.K., and Convoy I continued on to Casablanca. Assigned to Convoy II, Brownson reported to the British destroyer Ilex (D.61) for duty as part of an escort screen. At 2100, after transiting the Strait of Gibraltar and coming to within three miles of the Point Europa Light, Brownson and Guest (DD-472) were detached from Convoy II, came about, and got underway for Casablanca, arriving the following morning.

Early on 12 May 1943, Brownson weighed anchor and spent the day patrolling the entrance to Casablanca harbor in search of enemy submarines. Thatcher relieved the destroyer of patrol duties shortly after 0900 the next morning and she moored at Berth 14 in Casablanca's inner harbor. On 15 May, she got underway with Guest and Thatcher, met with Convoy OS-47 west of Rabat, French Morocco, and escorted a detachment of five merchant ships from the convoy back to Casablanca on 17 May.

Brownson joined an anti-submarine screen as part of TF 67 and departed Casablanca on 19 May 1943, to escort convoy GUF-8 to New York. In the early morning hours of 31 May, the ships of the convoy stood up Ambrose Channel and entered New York Harbor. Brownson proceeded on to Gravesend Bay to offload ammunition and then transited to the New York Navy Yard that afternoon and entered Dry Dock No. 2 for an availability (31 May–2 June).

On 7 June 1943, the destroyer returned to Gravesend Bay to load ammunition before turning her prow northward and proceeding to Casco Bay, where she anchored in Berth H the following day. She participated in various training operations locally with Destroyer Divisions (DesDivs) 47 and 48 until 11 June when she and Thatcher got underway for Delaware Bay to rendezvous with the small aircraft carrier Independence (CV-22). The two ships stood in to Delaware Bay just after 0800 on 13 June and anchored briefly before getting underway again early that afternoon to escort Independence to the Panama Canal.

On 18 June 1943, she transited the Panama Canal arriving in California on the 28th. Brownson moored starboard side to Pier 18 at Balboa, Panama Canal Zone, that evening. She weighed anchor in the morning hours of 21 June, and joined Task Group (TG) 52.1, consisting of Independence, Mobile (CL-63), Spence (DD-512), Thatcher, Fullam (DD-474), and Schroeder (DD-501). The task group cleared the Pacific entrance to the Panama Canal at 0730 and set course for San Diego, Calif.

TG 52.1 stood in to San Diego Harbor on 28 June 1943 and Brownson moored starboard side to Broadway Pier. From 4–6 July, the destroyer conducted gunnery and torpedo firing exercises, and fired shore bombardment practice at designated targets on San Clemente Island, Calif., with Trathen (DD-530) and Bradford (DD-545). On 6 July, Brownson sailed for San Francisco, Calif., where she arrived the following morning and remained until 11 July 1943, when she met with Bush (DD-529), Mullany (DD-528), and Ammen (DD-527), and took a station in an anti-submarine screen for Convoy No. 2045 as part of Task Group (TG) 96.11. The convoy formed into three columns and got underway that evening en route to an assigned ocean rendezvous point located south of Anchorage, Territory of Alaska, and west of British Columbia, Canada. On 18 July 1943, Phelps (DD-360), Dale (DD-353), Dewey (DD-349) and Hull (DD-350) relieved Brownson, Bush, Mullany, and Ammen of screening duties and the ships were then detached from Convoy No. 2045 to return to San Francisco, where they arrived on 21 July. Brownson departed San Francisco the following morning and got underway to escort the transport ship U.S. Grant (AP-29) to Adak, Aleutian Islands, Territory of Alaska.

Brownson transited the Amukta Pass with U.S. Grant during the evening of 29 July 1943 and stood in to Kuluk Bay, Adak, the next morning. The destroyer then escorted merchantmen and transports between Adak and Amchitka, Aleutian Islands, until 10 August, when she got underway in accordance with orders from TG 16.4, to act as a screen for a transport group as part of a simulated bombardment run on Great Sitkin Island, Aleutian Islands (10–11 August).

On 13 August 1943, Brownson reported to TG 16.3 and joined company with the ships of Task Unit (TU) 16.4.3, made up of battleships Tennessee (BB-43) and Pennsylvania (BB-38), destroyers Bache (DD-470) and Ammen, and light cruiser Santa Fe (CL-60). In accordance with Secret Operation Order No. 15-43, Ser. 00134, of ComAmphibPac, Commander Attack Force 16, the ships then departed Adak and proceeded to the southern fire support area off Kiska Island, T.A., to take part in the assault and invasion of Japanese-held Kiska and Little Kiska Islands.

During the early morning hours of 15 August 1943, Brownson and Santa Fe left the formation and proceeded independently to assume their designated fire support stations for the scheduled shore bombardment on Kiska Island. Brownson screened Santa Fe as she executed two bombardments on the Gertrude Cove Area. Beginning with the first salvo at 0730, each bombardment included three firing runs. Upon conclusion of the second bombardment in the early afternoon, both ships transited to a designated retirement area located approximately 20,000 yards southeast of Gertrude Cove. The next day, Brownson steamed in formation with TU 16.4.3 and countermarched between the fire support area and the retirement area patrolling for enemy vessels. On 17 August, she and Tennessee detached from the task unit and got underway to rendezvous with Idaho (BB-42) and Hutchins (DD-476) off Cape Sudak, Tanaga Island, Aleutian Islands, before steaming to Adak.

While moored at Adak on 18 August 1943, Brownson embarked Assistant Secretary of War John J. McCloy, Lt. Gen. John L. DeWitt, Commanding General, Western Defense Command and Fourth Army, Maj. Gen. George R. Pearkes, Canadian Army, and Col. William P. Scobey, General Staff Corps, Executive Officer to Assistant Secretary of War. The destroyer then got underway to transport the passengers to Kiska for a conference on board Pennsylvania with Commander Amphibious Forces, Pacific (ComPhibPac). At 0830 the following morning, Brownson transferred the men to Pennsylvania north of Kiska, before forming an anti-submarine screen with Ammen and escorting the battleship into Kiska Harbor. That evening, following the conference, she embarked Assistant Secretary of War McCloy and his party, along with 18 officers and 5 enlisted men from the U.S. Navy, Army, and Marine Corps, and got underway for Adak, arriving the following day (20 August).

Brownson operated in Alaskan waters transiting between the Aleutian Islands, Kodiak, and Dutch Harbor, Amaknak Island, Unalaska, conducting escort and patrol duties and participating in training operations. She departed for Pearl Harbor, Oahu, Territory of Hawaii, on 21 October, in company with Mullany, and arrived on 26 October.

On 2 November 1943, Brownson entered Dry Dock No. 3 at Pearl Harbor to undergo an availability. After exiting dry dock on 8 November, she conducted various exercises in assigned operating areas off Oahu until rendezvousing with Mullany on 9 November and getting underway to return to the Aleutian Islands. Brownson and Mullany reached Kuluk Bay, Adak, on 15 November, but adverse weather forced them to put to sea to ride out the storm. Once the high winds and rough seas subsided the following day, the two ships returned to Adak.

Serving as an escort, Brownson transited between the Aleutian Islands and the Komandorski Islands [Commander Islands], USSR, in company with the light cruisers Richmond (CL-9), Raleigh (CL-7), and Detroit (CL-8), and destroyers Bush, Mullany, Bache, and Ammen, as part of TF 94 (16–29 November 1943). At 1017 on 29 November, she got underway for Pearl Harbor, with Mullany, and the submarine chasers PC-582, PC-581, PC-578, PC-603, SC-1025, SC-1028, SC-1033, and SC-1068, arriving the morning of 6 December.

Brownson departed Pearl Harbor for the Southwest Pacific in company with Bache on 11 December 1943 to participate in operations in the Bismarck Archipelago. After making a brief stop at Funafuti [Tuvalu], on 16 December, both ships got underway the following day for Espíritu Santo Island, New Hebrides [Vanautu], where they refueled on 19 December and proceeded on to Milne Bay, Papua New Guinea, in company with Mullany. The three destroyers anchored in Milne Bay on 21 December, four days before Christmas, where they joined the Seventh Fleet. Brownson shifted to Buna Roads, Papua New Guinea, in accordance with CTF 76, Operation Order 3B-43 on 23 December and conducted anti-submarine patrol off Cape Ward Hunt (24–25 December) en route to Cape Cretin, Papua New Guinea.

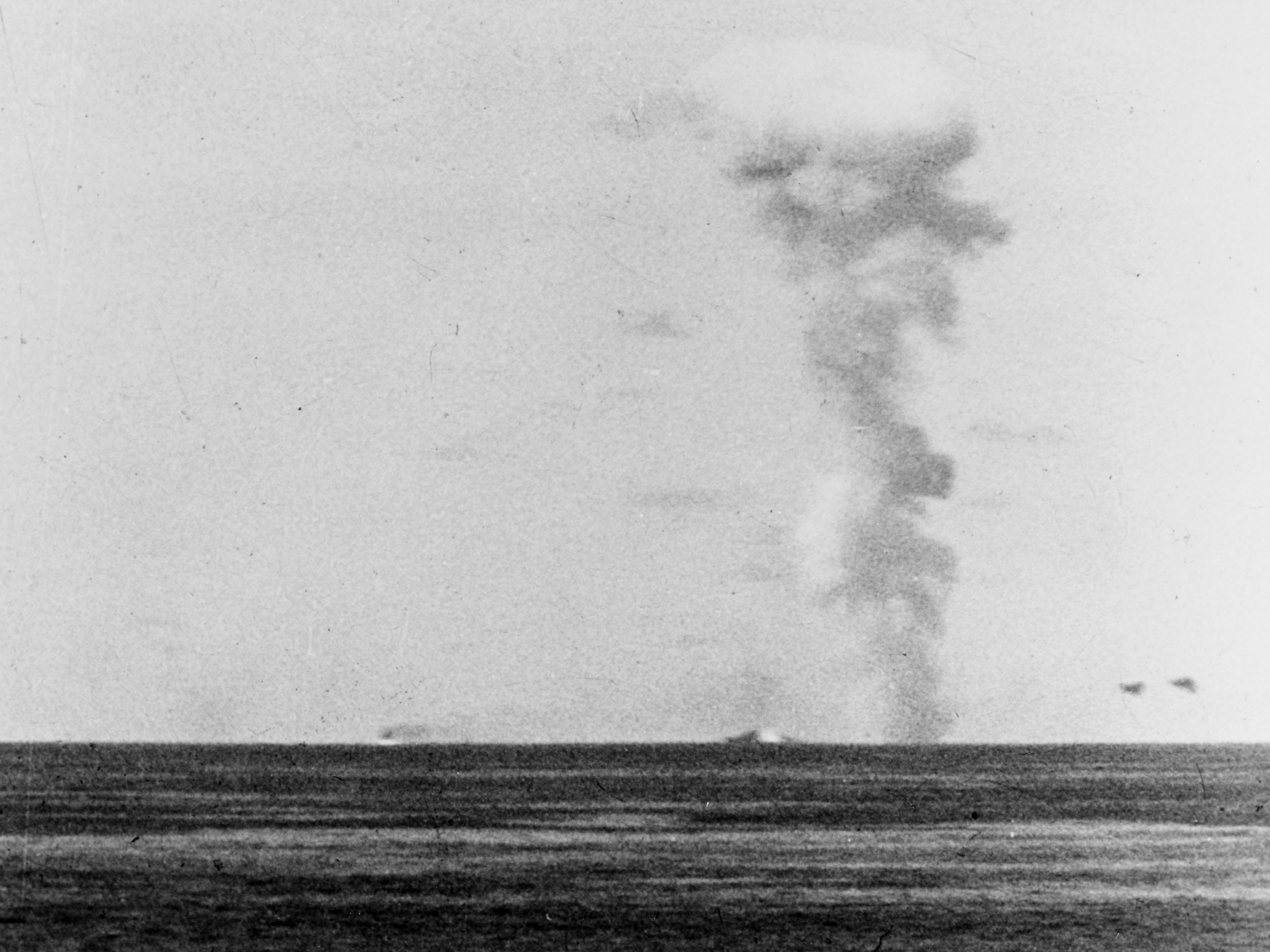
Brownson exploding off Cape Gloucester, 26 December 1943.

On 26 December 1943, Brownson departed Cape Cretin in company with Hutchins, Beale (DD-471), and Daly (DD-519), and began escorting the fleet tug Sonoma (AT-12) and seven tank landing ships to Borgen Bay while screening the landings on Cape Gloucester, New Britain as part of Operation Backhander.

At approximately 14:42, 26 December 1943, Brownson was hit by two bombs from a Japanese Aichi D3A Type 99 carrier dive bomber. The bombs struck to starboard of the centerline, near number two stack. A tremendous explosion followed, and the entire structure above the main deck as well as the deck plating, was gone. The ship listed 10 to 15 degrees to starboard, and settled rapidly amidships with the bow and stern canted upward.

The wounded were placed in rafts and at 14:50, the order was given by Lt. Cmdr. Maher to abandon ship. The amidships section was entirely underwater at that time. There was a single ripple like a depth charge explosion and the ship sank at 14:59. Brownson suffered the loss of 108 of her crew. The remainder were rescued by USS Daly and USS Lamson.

Footage of the sinking is included in Attack! The Battle of New Britain (at ~49m:57s) along with some footage of wounded survivors. Japanese losses in this action are estimated in the film as at 60 planes with a "dozen" friendly planes also lost.

== Honors ==
Brownson received one battle star for her World War II service.
