= Robert Brownson =

American football and basketball coach (1922–1975)

Biographical details
- Born: December 19, 1922
- Died: October 17, 1975 (aged 52); Cleveland, Ohio, U.S.

Playing career

Football
- c. 1946: Ashland

Coaching career (HC unless noted)

Football
- 1951–1952: New London HS (OH)
- 1953–1954: Portsmouth HS (OH)
- 1954–1957: Ashland

Basketball
- 1946–1947: Jeromesville HS (OH)
- 1954–1958: Ashland

Administrative career (AD unless noted)
- 1959–1971: Ashland

Head coaching record
- Overall: 21–10–1 (college football); 28–45 (college basketball)

Accomplishments and honors

Championships
- Football; 2 Mid-Ohio (1954–1955)

Awards
- Mid-Ohio Coach of the Year (1954)

Robert W. Brownson (December 19, 1922 – October 17, 1975) was an American football and basketball coach. He served as the head football coach at Ashland College—now known as Ashland University—in Ashland, Ohio from 1954 to 1957, compiling a record of 21–10–1. Brownson was also the head basketball coach at Ashland from 1954 to 1958, tallying a mark of 28–45. He was the athletic director at Ashland from 1959 to 1971.

Brownson died on at the age of 52, on October 17, 1975, at the Cleveland Clinic in Cleveland, Ohio.

== Head coaching record ==
=== College football ===
Year	Team	Overall	Conference	Standing	Bowl/playoffs
Ashland Eagles (Mid-Ohio League) (1954–1957)
1954	Ashland	7–0	4–0	1st	
1955	Ashland	7–2	5–0	1st	
1956	Ashland	3–5	2–3	4th	
1957	Ashland	4–3–1	3–1–1	2nd	
Ashland:		21–10–1	14–4–1		
Total:		21–10–1			
National championship Conference title Conference division title or championship game berth
