= Oliver Brownson =

American classical composer

Oliver Brownson (13 May 1746, in Bolton, Connecticut — 20 October 1815, in Smithfield, New York) was an American composer and music editor, who lived in Connecticut for much of his life. In 1775 he married Sarah Merrels, and they had at least one child. Oliver Brownson was a singing master in Connecticut during the last quarter of the 18th Century.

Among his most well-known tunes are: Colchester ("Great God, the heav'ns well-ordered frame"); Norfolk ("Alas, the brittle clay"); Salisbury ("God of my salvation, hear"); and Virginia ("Thy words the raging wind control").

== Publications ==
- Select Harmony, Containing the Necessary Rules of Psalmody, Together With a Collection of Approved Psalm Tunes, Hymns and Anthems, by Oliver Brownson. Hartford, Connecticut, 1783. 100 pp.
- A new Collection of Sacred Harmony. Simsbury, Connecticut, 1797.
