= USS Yankee (1892) =

Ship used in the Spanish–American War

Coordinates: 43°00′18″N 70°20′36″W

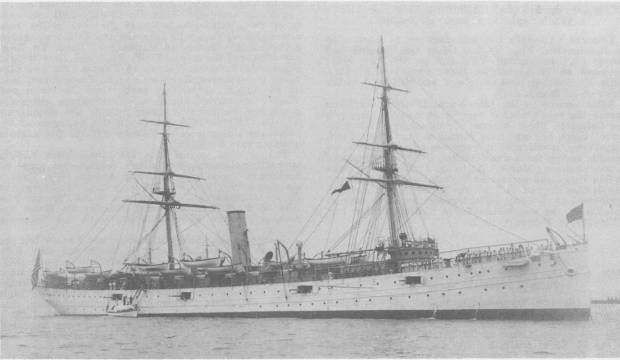
- Yankee as a training ship in the early 1900s.

History

United States
- Name: USS Yankee
- Launched: 14 June 1892
- Completed: 15 August 1892
- Acquired: 6 April 1898
- Commissioned: 14 April 1898; 1 May 1903; 15 June 1908
- Decommissioned: 16 March 1899; 25 September 1906
- Stricken: 17 April 1912
- Fate: Sunk 4 December 1908

General characteristics
- Displacement: 6,225 long tons (6,325 t) (full)
- Length: 406 ft 1.5 in (123.787 m)
- Beam: 48 ft 4.5 in (14.745 m)
- Draft: 21 ft 1 in (6.43 m) (aft)
- Speed: 14.5 kn (16.7 mph; 26.9 km/h)
- Complement: 282
- Armament: 10 × 5 in (130 mm) guns; 6 × QF 6-pounder Hotchkiss guns; 2 × Colt machine guns
- Notes: Spanish–American War; Battle of Guantánamo Bay; Action off Cienfuegos; Action off Casilda; Blockade of Cuba; Occupation of the Dominican Republic; Santo Domingo Affair

USS Yankee was originally El Norte, a steamer launched 14 June 1892 and delivered 15 August 1892 at Newport News, Virginia, by the Newport News Shipbuilding & Drydock Co. for the Southern Pacific Railroad's Morgan Line. The ship was acquired by the United States Navy from the Southern Pacific Company on 6 April 1898. The ship was renamed and commissioned at New York on 14 April 1898, Commander Willard H. Brownson in command.

== Career ==
=== Spanish–American War ===
After fitting out as an auxiliary cruiser, the ship joined in the Spanish–American War and patrolled the coastal waters between Block Island and Cape Henlopen until 27 May. That day, Yankee stopped at Tompkinsville, New York to coal ship. On 29 May, she returned to sea and shaped a southerly course to join the fleet off Cuba. En route, she touched briefly at St. Nicholas Mole, Haiti, on the evening of 2 June and then continued on toward Cuba. Early the following morning, Yankee joined the blockade off Santiago de Cuba and conducted patrols there for the next five days.

==== Battle of Guantánamo Bay ====
On the morning of 6 June, she dueled shore batteries briefly and, near Santiago and on 7 June, joined Marblehead and St. Louis for a cable cutting incursion into Guantanamo Bay. While St. Louis dragged for and cut the three cables, Yankee and Marblehead covered her activities by engaging the Spanish gunboats Alvarado and Sandoval. After putting the Spanish gunboats to flight, the two American warships turned their attention toward the fort at Caimanera which had been making a nuisance of itself with its single large-caliber gun—a venerable, smooth-bore muzzleloader. As Yankee and Marblehead silenced their last adversary, St. Louis completed her cable-cutting mission; and the three ships exited the bay.

Yankee then briefly resumed blockade duty off Santiago, but on 8 June got underway for St. Nicholas Mole with dispatches. On 9 June, just before she arrived at her destination, the auxiliary cruiser stopped two merchantmen and inspected them. They turned out to be the Norwegian SS Norse and the British SS Ely, so Yankee allowed them to proceed on their way. She completed her mission at Haiti and returned to Santiago early the following morning. At about noon on 10 June, Yankee set a course for Port Antonio, Jamaica, to deliver dispatches and to search for the suspected blockade runner SS Purissima Concepcion. After delivering the dispatches at Port Antonio on 10 June. and visiting Montego Bay in search of Purissima Concepcion, the warship returned to the Santiago area on 12 June. However, that same day, she received orders to move again, this time to Cienfuegos, about halfway up the southern coast of Cuba from Santiago, to stand guard there against Purissima Concepcion's expected run.

==== Action off Cienfuegos ====
The auxiliary cruiser arrived off Cienfuegos on 13 June and began patrolling the approaches to the harbor. At about 13:15 that afternoon, she spied a steamer standing out of the port toward her. Identifying the stranger as the Spanish gunboat Diego Velázquez, Yankee cleared for action and closed the enemy. At about 1,500 yd (1,400 m) range, the American ship put her helm over, unmasked her port battery, and opened fire. The Spanish gunboat, markedly inferior to Yankee in armament, opted for a running fight in which she presented the smallest possible target and in which Yankee could bring only one or two of her guns to bear without turning away from her target's course. Consequently, Diego Velázquez came about and headed back toward Cienfuegos, firing as she went. Yankee followed, shooting her port forecastle gun constantly and periodically turning to starboard to unmask her entire port battery. Ultimately, Diego Velázquez reached safety under the protection of Sabanilla Battery, and the gunboat Lince came out to join her in the fray. Yankee continued to fire her port battery as she passed the two gunboats and shore battery abeam at about 4,000 yd (3,700 m) range. She completed one pass and then put the helm to port and came about for another pass, this time bringing her starboard battery into action for the first time. During Yankee's second pass, Diego Velázquez and Lince abandoned the fight and sought refuge in Cienfuegos harbor. Yankee continued firing on Sabanilla Battery until 15:00 and then withdrew to her blockade station off the harbor.

Yankee remained off Cienfuegos for two days. On 14 June, there was a brief moment of anxiety when a large man-of-war started out of the harbor. Yankee cleared for action and stood in toward the warship, but all hands breathed a sigh of relief when the newcomer was identified as the neutral German SMS Geier. The following afternoon, the auxiliary cruiser gave up her vigil for Purissima Concepcion off Cienfuegos and set a course back to the eastern end of Cuba. She rejoined the Santiago blockade on 16 June but put into the anchorage at Guantanamo Bay the following day to take on coal. Late on 18 June, the ship returned to sea bound once more for blockade duty off Cienfuegos. On 19 June, during the passage from Guantanamo Bay to Cienfuegos, Yankee stopped and inspected two sailing vessels—a British schooner and a Norwegian bark—and a steamer, the British SS Adula. All three had their papers in order, and the auxiliary cruiser allowed them to proceed unmolested. That evening, she arrived off Cienfuegos and began cruising on blockade station between that port and Casilda.

==== Action off Casilda ====
At about 08:30 on the morning of 20 June, Yankee sighted a steamer lying in Casilda harbor closely fitting the description of Purissima Concepcion. The American ship stood in as close to the shoals as she dared and then fired a shot across the steamer's bow in an unsuccessful effort to make her show her colors. Instead, the merchantman began preparations for getting underway. Yankee responded by opening a steady fire at extreme range. As the supposed Spanish steamer moved farther into shoal water and disappeared behind some islets, Yankee shifted fire to an enemy gunboat and a floating battery, both of which had opened an ineffective fire upon her. The extreme range—in excess of 5,000 yd (4,600 m)—made the gunfire from both sides so ineffective that Yankee broke off the engagement and resumed her patrols between Casilda and Cienfuegos. The auxiliary cruiser continued her blockade of that stretch of the Cuban coast until 24 June, when her dwindling supply of coal forced her to head for Key West. En route to that base, she visited the Isle of Pines where she captured and destroyed five Spanish fishing vessels on 25 June.

==== Blockade of Cuba ====
Yankee arrived in Key West on 27 June and began taking on coal. She completed her refueling operation and departed Key West on 3 July, bound for New York, where she arrived two days later. She remained at New York until 12 July, taking on ammunition for transportation to the Eastern Squadron on the Cuban blockade. On 13 July, she reached Norfolk, where she spent another four days taking on additional ammunition for the ships of the blockading squadron. Yankee left Hampton Roads on 17 July and arrived in Guantanamo Bay four days later. There, she began the tedious but dangerous job of transferring her cargo of ammunition to the various warships in the anchorage. The ship remained at Guantanamo Bay until 11 August, when she resumed blockade duty, patrolling initially in search of the armed merchant ship Montserrat. Three days later, while she cruised the northern coast of Cuba, Yankee received word of the cessation of hostilities in response to Spain's suit for peace. She reentered Guantanamo Bay on the afternoon of 15 August and remained there until 24 August when she headed home.

=== Training ship ===
Yankee stopped briefly at Tompkinsville at the end of August and then made a round-trip voyage to League Island, and back to Tompkinsville at the beginning of September. She returned to League Island on 19 September. There, her crew of New York Naval Militia reservists left the ship to return home via train for mustering out. Though she remained in commission technically until decommissioned on 16 March 1899, Yankee spent the interim at League Island. That location also remained her home for the more than three years she spent in reserve. Her inactivity ended when she was placed back in commission on 1 May 1903, Commander G. P. Colvocoressee in command.

Following recommissioning, Yankee served along the east coast between Chesapeake Bay and the Maine coast training landsmen in the ways of the sea. Early in December 1903, she headed south for winter maneuvers and gunnery drills with the North Atlantic Fleet in the gulf and the Caribbean around Hispaniola. Yankee served at Santo Domingo to help restore order and to straighten out the country's financial muddle. On 1 February, the ship was fired upon by rebel troops. In response, the United States sent the protected cruisers USS Columbia and USS Newark. In the Santo Domingo Affair, the two ships bombarded the city and sent a landing party ashore on 11 February.

After visiting a number of West Indian ports in conjunction with the exercises, she returned north late in March 1904, and on 6 April, was moored to a pier at League Island where she remained until October. On 16 October, she got underway for Newport News to embark 400 landsmen there before resuming her training schedule.

In December, Yankee made a round-trip voyage to Panama to exchange marine garrisons in the Canal Zone. She disembarked some of the returning marines at Hampton Roads on 31 December 1904 and on New Year's Day 1905 pushed on toward Tompkinsville to deliver the remainder. After a return voyage to Newport News, she headed for League Island where she entered the navy yard for repairs on 13 January.

=== Occupation of the Dominican Republic ===
The ship completed those repairs on 9 March and loaded men, stores, and ammunition at Tompkinsville from 10 to 12 March before getting underway for the West Indies. For the next seventeen months, the island of Hispaniola, Cuba's neighbor to the east, became her center of operations. Successive coups since assassination of the dictator Heureaux in 1899 had added civil strife and anarchy to the list of woes of a country already racked by desperate financial problems. Yankee spent most of her time in Dominican waters and ports, departing infrequently for replenishment stops at such American bases as Key West and Guantanamo Bay and made one voyage back to New York in July 1905 for repairs at the New York Navy Yard.

On 20 August 1906 she had a very minor collision with a float being towed by Transfer No. 16 in the East River. The ship, by then classified as a transport, left for Santo Domingo on 21 August 1906 and after participating in the Presidential Naval Review held at Oyster Bay from 2 to 4 September, she unloaded stores at New York in preparation for inactivation. On 25 September, Yankee was again placed out of commission at Portsmouth, New Hampshire. Sometime during the next two years, she was moved to the Boston Navy Yard, for it was at that location that she was once again commissioned on 15 June 1908, Commander Charles C. Marsh in command.

=== Sinking ===
After shakedown early in July, the ship resumed a familiar duty—training. With naval militia reservists or Naval Academy midshipmen embarked, she spent the summer of 1908 cruising the Atlantic coast between Boston and Chesapeake Bay. On 23 September 1908, during one such training exercise, Yankee ran aground on Spindle Rock near Hen and Chickens lightship. She remained there until refloated on 4 December by the Arbuckle Wrecking Company. Her reprieve however, was short-lived. While being towed to New Bedford on the day she was refloated, she sank in Buzzards Bay. Yankee's name was finally struck from the Naval Vessel Register on 17 April 1912. Her boilers and other equipment were salvaged in 1917–1918.

Side Scan Sonar Image of the Wreck

== Awards ==
- Sampson Medal
- Navy Expeditionary Medal
- Spanish Campaign Medal
