= USS Brownson (DD-868) =

Gearing-class destroyer

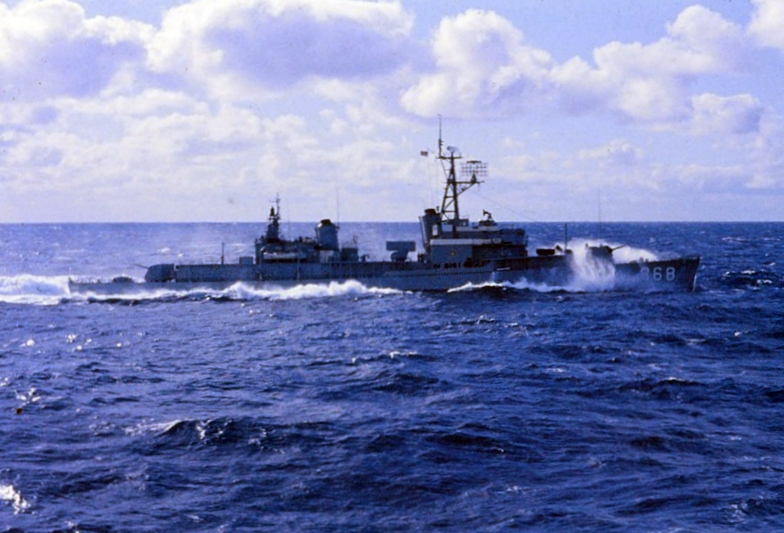
- USS Brownson in the Atlantic, December 1964

History

United States
- Name: Brownson
- Builder: Bethlehem Mariners Harbor, Staten Island, New York
- Laid down: 13 February 1945
- Launched: 7 July 1945
- Sponsored by: Miss Caroline Brownson Hart
- Christened: 7 July 1945
- Commissioned: 17 November 1945
- Decommissioned: 30 September 1976
- Stricken: 30 September 1976
- Home port: Newport, Rhode Island
- Identification: Callsign: NBGN; Hull number: DD-868
- Motto: VIRTUTE ET AUDACIA
- Nickname(s): The Bouncing B
- Fate: Scrapped

General characteristics
- Class & type: Gearing-class destroyer

USS Brownson (DD-868) was a Gearing-class destroyer and the second ship of the United States Navy to be named for Rear Admiral Willard H. Brownson, USN (1845–1935).

== Design and launch ==
Brownson was designed by Gibbs and Cox, Naval Architects, New York office. Its keel was laid down by the Bethlehem Steel Corporation at Staten Island in New York on 13 February 1945; launched on 7 July 1945, sponsored by Ensign Caroline Brownson Hart, USNR, granddaughter of Admiral Brownson; and commissioned on 17 November 1945.

== Operations ==
Brownson conducted shakedown in the Atlantic and Caribbean and was then placed in a reduced operational status at Bath, Maine for six months. Resuming active operations in October 1946, she participated in Operation Highjump between November 1946 and April 1947. On 10 February 1947, a boat party attempted to make a landing in the Antarctic on Charcot Island but was unsuccessful because of heavy field ice within three miles of the coastline.

Brownson spent the summer and fall of 1947 operating out of Naval Station Newport, Rhode Island. In February 1948 she took part in the 2nd Fleet exercises in the Caribbean and then Joined the 6th Fleet in the Mediterranean. She returned to Newport in June 1948 and spent June 1948 to May 1949 conducting reserve cruises.

In May 1949 she entered Boston Naval Shipyard for an extensive modernization which lasted until March 1950. She conducted refresher training in the Caribbean and in the summer of 1950 made a Midshipman cruise in the Caribbean. She then participated in fleet exercises, operating out of Newport.

During night operations on Bermuda on 8 November 1950 Brownson collided with USS Charles H. Roan. She returned to Boston for repairs and further modernization. Leaving the yard in February 1951 she joined the 6th Fleet in the Mediterranean. The period between October 1951 and August 1952 was spent in the vicinity of Newport. In August 1952 she went to the North Atlantic with the 2nd Fleet for NATO's Operation Mainbrace. In October 1952 she rejoined the 6th Fleet in the Mediterranean. Returning to Newport in February 1953, she operated along the Atlantic seaboard and in the Caribbean until August 1954, with the exception of one Midshipmen cruise and participation in Operation Springboard.

She departed Newport 2 August for an extended tour in the Far East with the 7th Fleet. In the Far East Brownson cruised in Japanese, Philippine, and Korean waters until January 1955. Departing the Far East she returned to the east coast, via the Suez Canal, arriving at Newport 14 March 1955.

== 1955–1976 ==
Brownson was fitted with a variable depth sonar receiver which could be lowered into the sea from a boom attached to the fantail of the ship. The purpose of the sonar pod was to detect submarines under a thermal layer which would hide their presence from a hulled placed sonar receiver. Brownson evaluated this sonar along the northern coastal area, where submarines could hide in trenches. In 1962 the ship transferred to Cuban waters during the period of tension that culminated in the Cuban quarantine (the Cuban Missile Crisis). Brownson returned to home port in November 1962, then entered a Boston shipyard to receive the FRAM I modification in 1962–63. This included removal of gun mount 52, where anti-submarine torpedo launchers were placed, with a DASH (Drone Antisubmarine Helicopter) deck/hangar added aft. The ship received ASROC among other upgrades. It returned from service in Vietnam via the Suez Canal in 1967. It was later modified in the Boston NSY in 1967 with a large, low frequency, rubberized, prototype sonar dome just forward of midships and a smaller sonar receiver, aft but also along the keel, to achieve "3D" sonar "pictures". Later, in 1967 Sonarmen Paul Kronfield and Robert Devon reported for duty aboard Brownson. They later attended PAIR factory school conducted by Sperry Rand, the manufacturers of the new AN/SQQ-23X sonar. Brownson spent several years operating out of Newport with DESDEVGRU-2 (Destroyer Development Group Two) evaluating the sonar system. After a brief shipyard in Boston, the NIXIE anti torpedo system was installed and further tested at sea on multiple cruises. Brownson was required to operate during heavy storms to evaluate the new rubber dome under conditions of high sea states. It underwent REFTRA (Refresher Training) in Gitmo in winter 1971–72, joined the Sixth Fleet north of Egypt that spring, and participated in NATO fleet exercises.

Brownson was decommissioned and stricken from the Naval Vessel Register on 30 September 1976 and sold for scrap on 10 June 1977.
