= Willard H. Brownson =

American admiral (1845–1935)

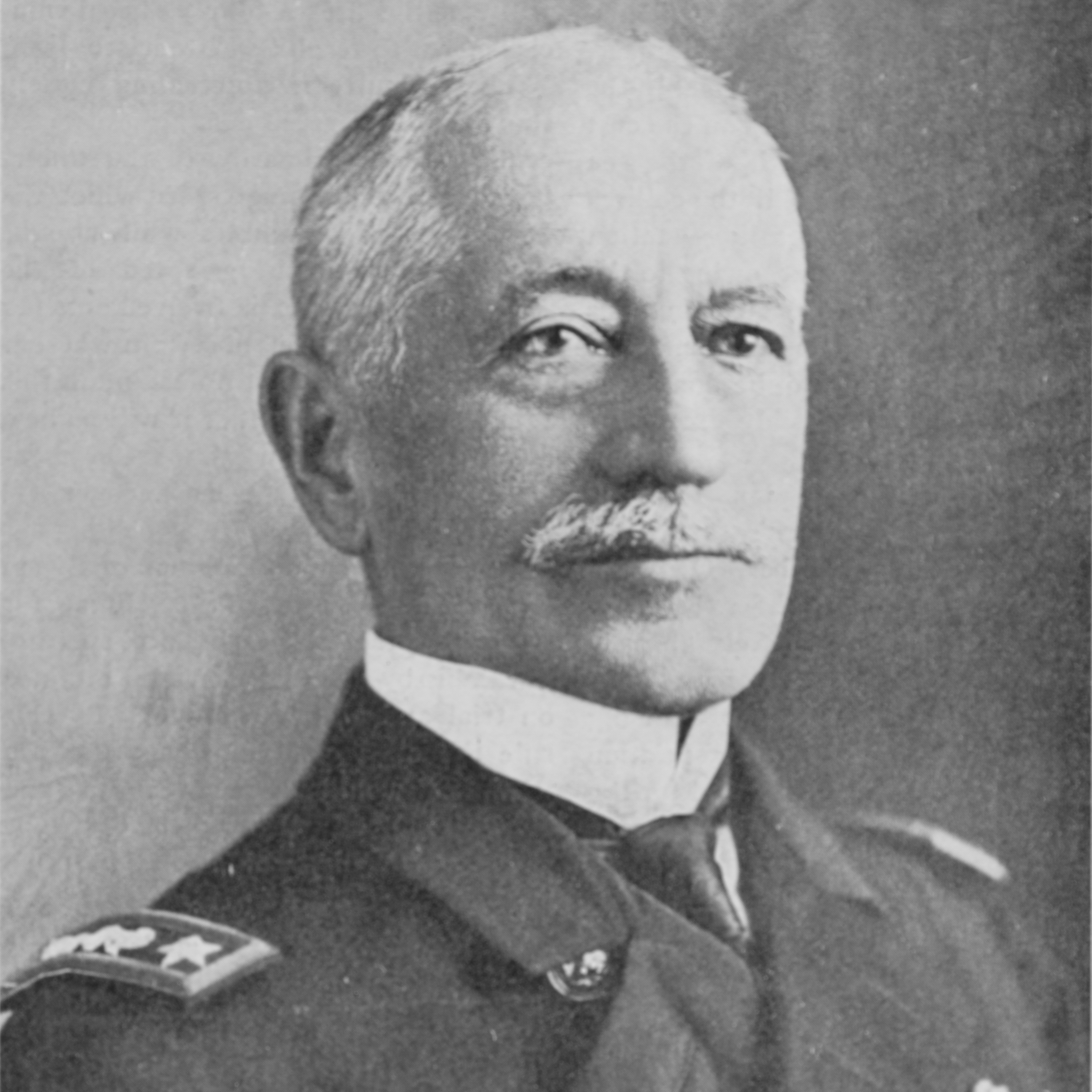
- Brownson c. 1900 – c. 1909
- Born: July 8, 1845; Lyons, New York, U.S.
- Died: March 16, 1935 (aged 89); Washington, D.C., U.S.
- Military career
- Allegiance: United States
- Branch: United States Navy
- Service years: 1865–1907
- Rank: Rear Admiral
- Commands: USC&GS George S. Blake; USS Detroit (C-10); USS Yankee; USS Alabama (BB-8); Superintendent, United States Naval Academy; 4th Division, North Atlantic Fleet; Special Service Squadron; United States Asiatic Fleet; Chief of the Bureau of Navigation
- Conflicts: Brownson Expedition: Battle of Boca Teacapan; Brazilian Naval Revolt: Rio de Janeiro Affair; Spanish–American War: Battle of Guantánamo Bay

Rear-Admiral Willard Herbert Brownson (July 8, 1845 – March 16, 1935), was a United States Navy officer whose career included service against pirates in Mexico and service during the Spanish–American War. He also served a term as Superintendent of the United States Naval Academy.

== Early life and career ==
A native of Lyons, New York, Brownson graduated from the US Naval Academy in 1865. He served in the North Atlantic Squadron until 1868, when he was assigned to the Pacific Squadron. In 1870, during his tour of duty on the steam sloop-of-war USS Mohican, Brownson and a detachment of men fought the Battle of Boca Teacapan against the pirate ship Forward in Mexican waters. During the fighting, United States Marines and U.S. Navy sailors captured the enemy ship and defeated a superior force of pirates positioned at a shore battery.

In 1872, Brownson reported for duty at the Naval Academy's Department of Mathematics. Three years later, he was sent as a young lieutenant to the Asiatic Station. Brownson returned to the Naval Academy in 1878 as Assistant Commandant of Cadets. In 1881, he was ordered to the United States Coast and Geodetic Survey as a lieutenant commander, where he commanded the survey ship USC&GS George S. Blake until 1884. After brief duty as executive officer of the steam frigate USS Powhatan, he was named Inspector of Hydrography for the Coast Survey.

After a return to the Naval Academy as Commandant of Cadets, Brownson served for two years on the Board of Inspection and Survey. He commanded the auxiliary cruiser USS Yankee during the Spanish–American War of 1898, seeing action in the Battle of Guantánamo Bay.

In 1899 Brownson achieved the rank of captain and command of the battleship USS Alabama, and from 1902 to 1905 was Superintendent of the Naval Academy.

Brownson was promoted to rear admiral in 1905, when he hoisted his flag on board the armored cruiser USS West Virginia as Commander, 4th Division, North Atlantic Fleet. He served as Commander, Special Service Squadron in Central American waters and was Commander-in-Chief of the United States Asiatic Fleet from 15 October 1906 to 31 March 1907.

In 1907, Brownson was assigned as Chief of the Bureau of Navigation, which handled the U.S. Navy's personnel matters. In July 1907, he was transferred to the retired list, but continued to serve in his post at the Bureau of Navigation until December 1907. That month, President Theodore Roosevelt decided to give command of hospital ships to U.S. Navy doctors, against the advice of Brownson, who then resigned from the Navy. A storm of protest arose from within the Navy and from the public, but Brownson's active naval career was over.

Brownson married Isabella Robinson Roberts in July 1872. Their first child, Henry was born in 1874 and died in 1876 shortly after his father left for the Asiatic Station. The following spring his daughter Harriet was born. In 1878 another son, Roswell, was born and in 1894 a second daughter, Caroline Robinson, was born. Caroline Brownson married Thomas C. Hart, later an admiral and the last Commander-in-Chief of the Asiatic Fleet. Harriet married Admiral Charles Lincoln Hussey, who as an ensign received the Navy Cross during the Spanish–American War.

Brownson died at Washington, D.C., on 16 March 1935.

== Namesakes ==
Two U.S. Navy destroyers have been named USS Brownson in Brownson's honor.

== Gallery ==
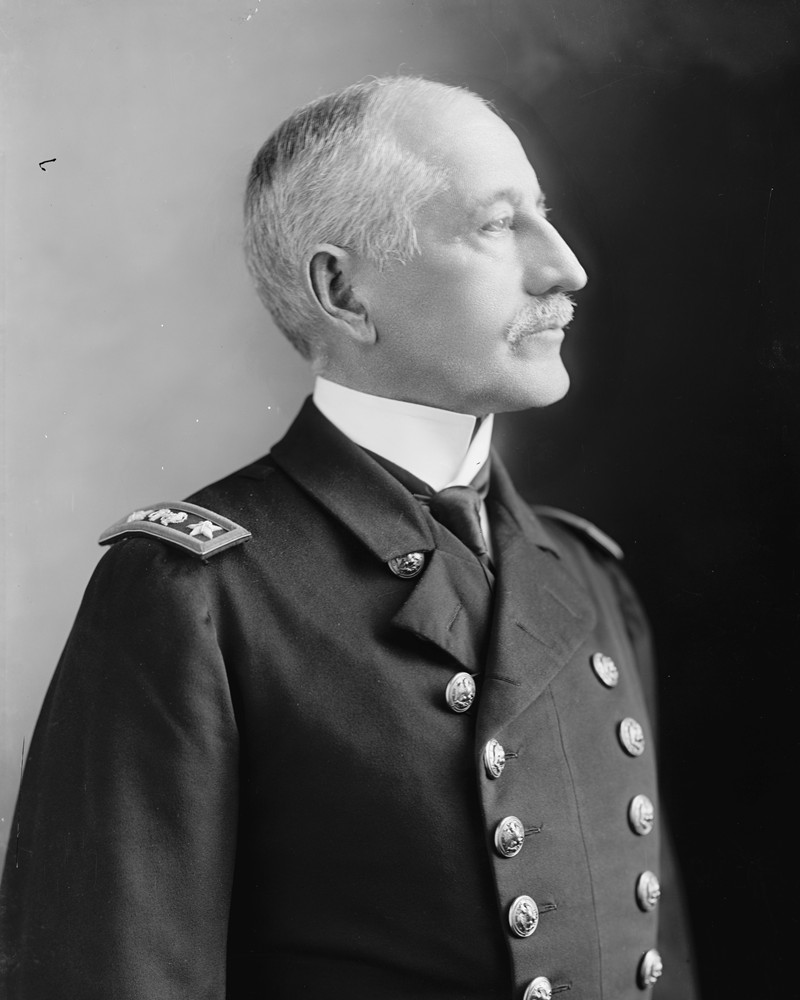

== See also ==
- List of superintendents of the United States Naval Academy

== Attribution ==
Military offices
Preceded by Richard Wainwright	Superintendent of United States Naval Academy; 1902–1905	Succeeded by James H. Sands
Preceded by Charles J. Train	Commander-in-Chief, United States Asiatic Fleet; 15 October 1906 – 31 March 1907	Succeeded by John Hubbard*
