= USS Detroit (C-10) =

Montgomery-class unprotected cruiser of the United States Navy

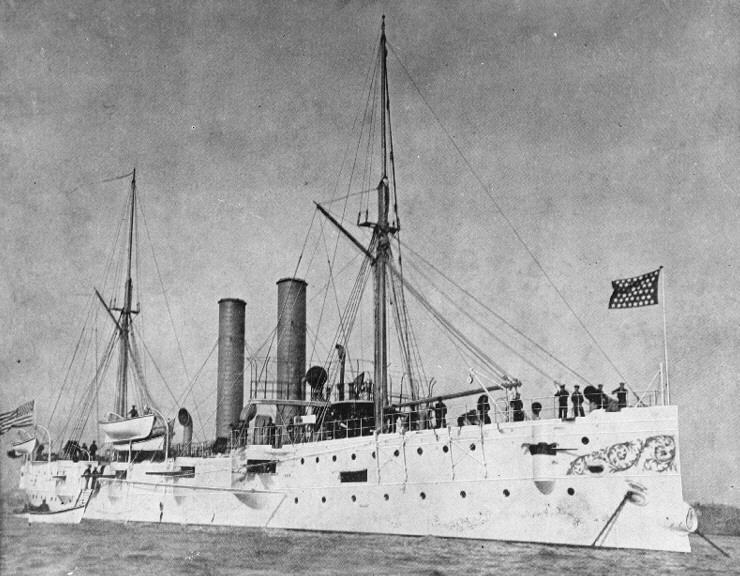
- USS Detroit (C-10) circa 1890s

History

United States
- Name: Detroit
- Namesake: City of Detroit, Michigan
- Builder: Columbian Iron Works, Baltimore, Maryland
- Launched: 28 October 1891
- Sponsored by: Miss F. Malster
- Commissioned: 20 July 1893
- Decommissioned: 1 August 1905
- Stricken: 12 July 1910
- Identification: Hull symbol: C-10
- Fate: Sold for scrap, 22 December 1910

General characteristics (as built)
- Class & type: Montgomery-class unprotected cruiser
- Displacement: 2,094 long tons (2,128 t) (standard); 2,235 long tons (2,271 t) (full load)
- Length: 269 ft 6 in (82.14 m)
- Beam: 37 ft (11 m)
- Draft: 14 ft 7 in (4.45 m) (mean); 16 ft 8 in (5.08 m) (max)
- Installed power: 5,400 ihp (4,000 kW)
- Propulsion: 2 × vertical triple expansion reciprocating engines; 2 × screws
- Sail plan: Schooner
- Speed: 17 knots (31 km/h; 20 mph)
- Armament: 2 × 6 in (152 mm)/40 caliber guns; 8 × 5 in (127 mm)/40 caliber guns; 6 × 6-pounder (57 mm (2.2 in)) guns; 2 × 1-pounder (37 mm (1.5 in)) guns; 2 × Gatling guns; 3 × 18-inch (450 mm) Torpedo tubes
- Armor: Deck: 7/16 in (11 mm); Conning tower: 2 in (51 mm)

USS Detroit (C-10) was a Montgomery-class unprotected cruiser of the United States Navy which was authorized by an Act of Congress in September 1888. Detroit was launched on 28 October 1891 at Columbian Iron Works, Baltimore, Maryland, sponsored by Miss F. Malster. The cruiser was commissioned on 20 July 1893. It was the third ship to be named for Detroit, Michigan.

== Brazilian Naval Revolt ==
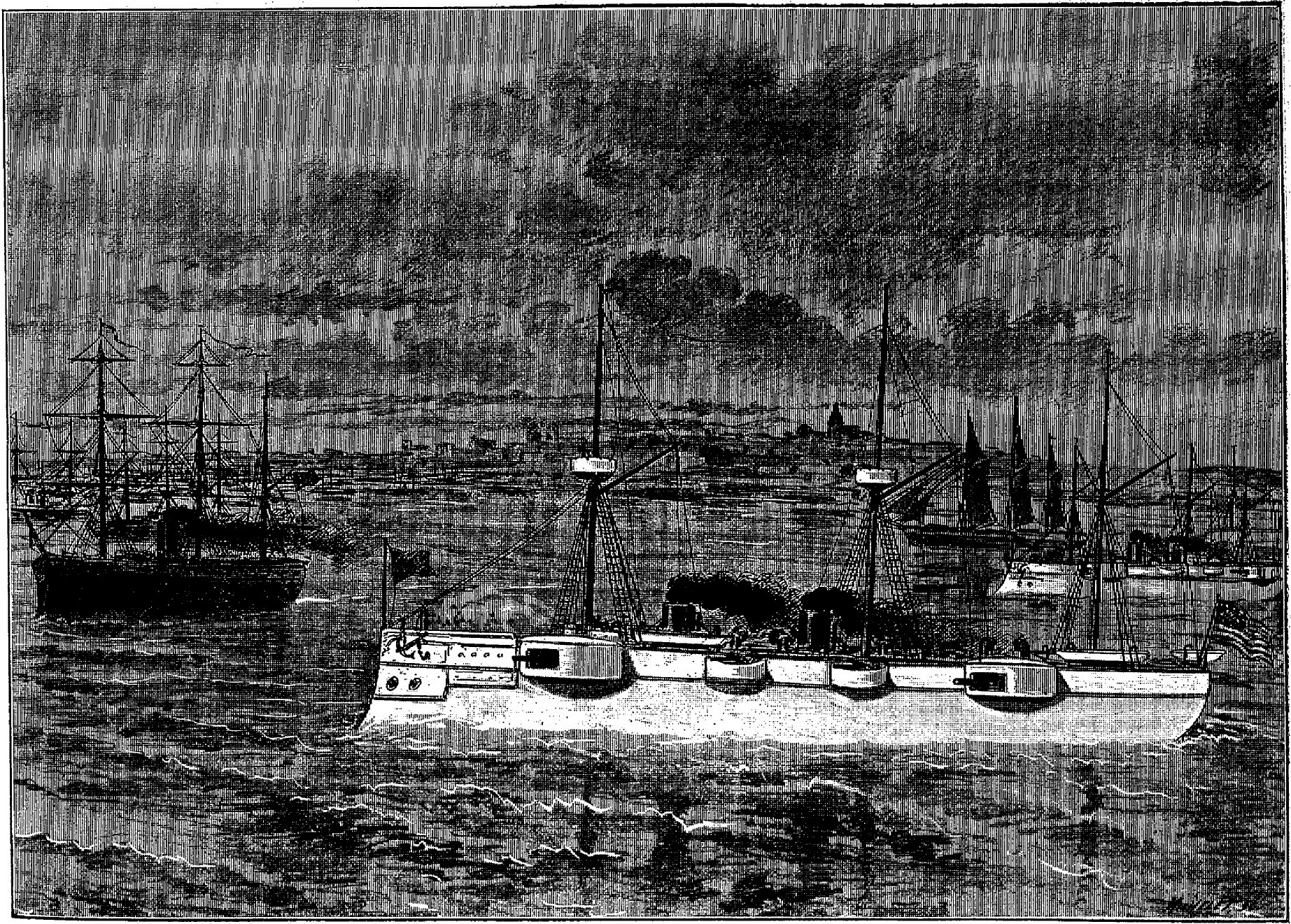
Detroit in the Guanabara Bay, during the Rio de Janeiro Affair at the Brazilian Naval Revolt (L'Univers illustré, Levy (Paris), nº 2.029, 10 February 1894).

Detroit sailed from Norfolk 5 October 1893 for Rio de Janeiro, Brazil, and lay at anchor in the harbor to protect American citizens and interests during revolutionary disturbances in Brazil, during which she engaged the rebel cruiser Trajano in a short and bloodless action. After, Detroit returned to Norfolk, Virginia on 24 April 1894. She sailed on 16 October to serve on the Asiatic Station for two years, cruising along the Chinese coast, and visiting ports in Japan and Korea.

== Overhaul and Spanish–American War ==
Detroit returned to New York City on 17 May 1897, and after overhaul, sailed for Key West where she was based from 16 October 1897, in view of the increasingly tense situation in the Caribbean. During the Spanish–American War Detroit was part of a US naval squadron that shelled Fort San Cristobal, Castillo San Felipe del Morro, and several shore batteries as part of the bombardment of San Juan on 12 May 1898.

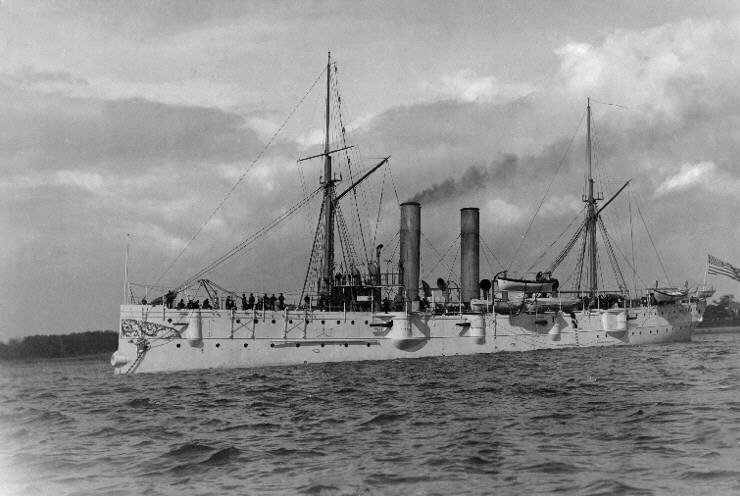
USS Detroit at anchor

== Nicaragua and Venezuela and decommission ==
Detroit returned to the Caribbean in February 1899. She protected American interests in Nicaragua, and then in September during the revolutionary movements in Venezuela. She remained at anchor at La Guaira during October and November, then returned to her base at Key West 21 December 1899. Except for two short cruises in 1900 into the Caribbean, she remained at Key West until May when she sailed to Portsmouth, New Hampshire and was taken out of commission on 23 May 1900.

== Recommission and South America ==
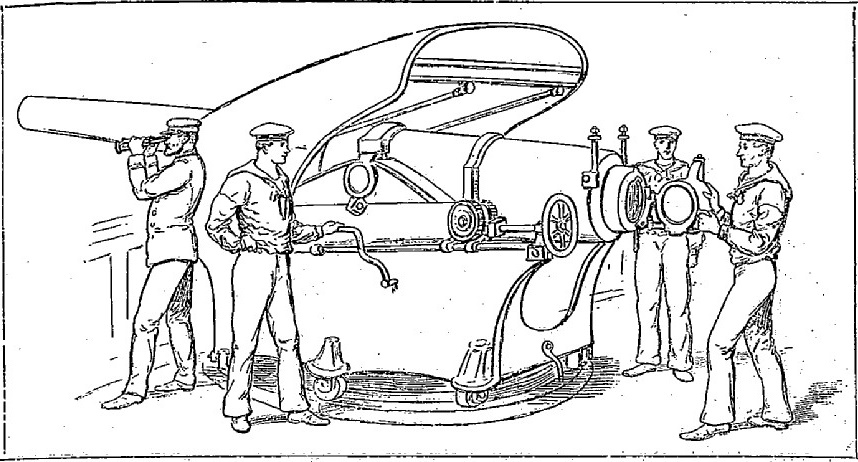
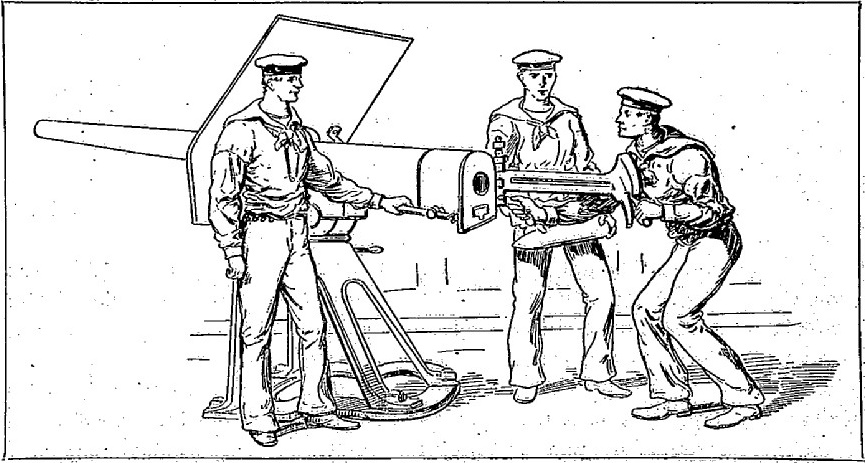
Combat preparations on board Detroit (L'Univers Illustré, 1894).

Recommissioned on 23 September 1902, Detroit sailed for the Caribbean in November for squadron maneuvers at Culebra and San Juan. She joined Fortune at Port of Spain, Trinidad, in January 1903, and towed her around the coast of South America to Talcahuana, Chile. Detroit operated between Montevideo, Uruguay, and Bahia and Santos, Brazil, until January 1904 when she arrived at Puerto Plata, Santo Domingo, to protect American interests in the revolution-torn island. Her diplomatic offices resulted in a peace conference in June, after which the insurgent army capitulated at Monte Cristi.

== Final decommission ==
Except for a brief cruise to Boston and on to Nova Scotia and New Brunswick in the summer of 1904, Detroit remained off troubled Santo Domingo. She returned to Boston in July 1905, was placed out of commission 1 August 1905, and sold on 22 December 1910.
