= Rio de Janeiro Affair =

- Part of the Brazilian Naval Revolt
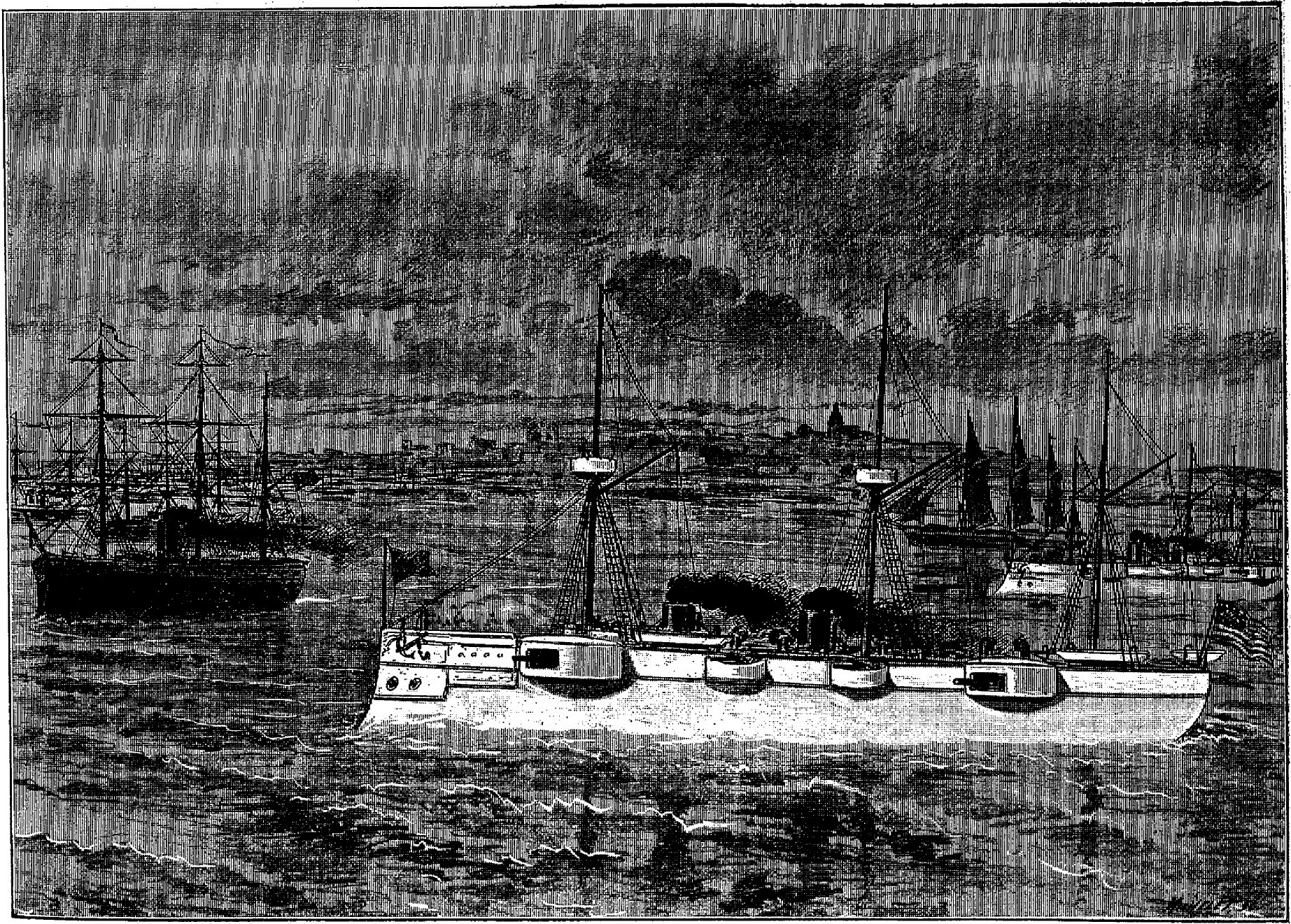
- Cruiser Detroit in the Guanabara Bay, during the Brazilian Naval Revolt (L'Univers illustré, Levy (Paris), nº 2.029, 10 February 1894).
Date	9–21 January 1894
Location	Guanabara Bay, Rio de Janeiro, Brazil
Result	American victory: End of the rebel blockade; Rio de Janeiro reopened to American commerce

Belligerents
United States	Brazilian navy rebels

Commanders and leaders
(United States) Andrew Benham (United States) Willard Brownson	Saldanha da Gama (surrendered)

Strength
2 gunboats 3 cruisers	Land: 1 fort Sea: 2 coastal battleships 4 cruisers 1 monitor 1 gunboat 7 torpedo boats 9 auxiliary cruisers

Casualties and losses
None	1 ironclad heavily damaged
- 2 American merchant ships received slight damage from rifle fire

The Rio de Janeiro Affair refers to a series of incidents during the Brazilian Naval Revolt in January 1894. Following three attacks on American merchant ships in the harbour of Rio de Janeiro, a bloodless naval engagement occurred between a United States Navy warship and an ironclad of Rear Admiral Saldanha da Gama's rebel fleet. Ultimately the Americans completed their objective, and Gama offered to surrender his fleet to the Americans, but the offer was never pursued.

== Affair ==
The incidents which led to the short engagement began on 21 January 1894, when the 586 ton American bark SS Julia Rollins was fired on with rifles from a fort on Cobras Island, while heading to Gamboa. Brazilian fire was heavy though nobody was harmed; the American crewmen were forced to take cover and maneuver their ship out of the fort's range, where they laid anchor. The Brazilian rebels then opened fire again, but this time with the guns of the ironclad cruisers Trajano and Guanabara. Julia Rollins moved once more until finding a safe anchorage, then a boat with a few sailors was lowered and sent to inform admiral Andrew E. K. Benham, who was in command of three cruisers at Rio de Janeiro with orders to protect American interests and observe the rebel blockade of the city. On 26 January, another incident occurred when the bark Agate was fired at with rifles and naval guns from Cobras Island and the rebel cruisers. Again nobody was hurt, but admiral Benham, who was busy communicating with Gama, warned him not to attack American vessels. USS Detroit, under commander Willard H. Brownson, was one of the modern cruisers in Benham's squadron. The other two were the USS San Francisco and USS Newark. Admiral Saldanha da Gama's fleet of twenty-four ships was much stronger, as most of the rebel navy was stationed at Rio de Janeiro, though only the Trajano, the cruiser Guanabara and the gunboat Liberdade were directly involved. The 1,400 ton Trajano was armed with twelve guns and the much larger 2,200 ton Guanabara mounted eight. Liberdade was only 250 tons but armed with eight guns. It was Gama's flagship and patrolled back and forth between the two cruisers and the main fleet. Brazilian commanders expected a battle against the American squadron so men from other ships were used to reinforce the Trajano and the Guanabara.

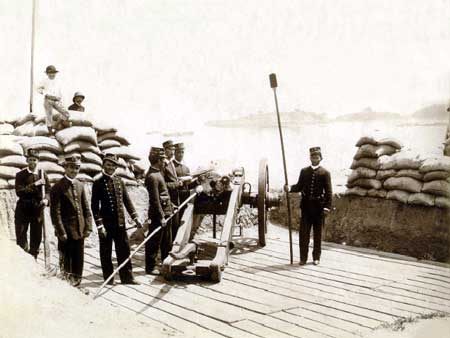
A Brazilian army shore battery at Rio de Janeiro in 1894.

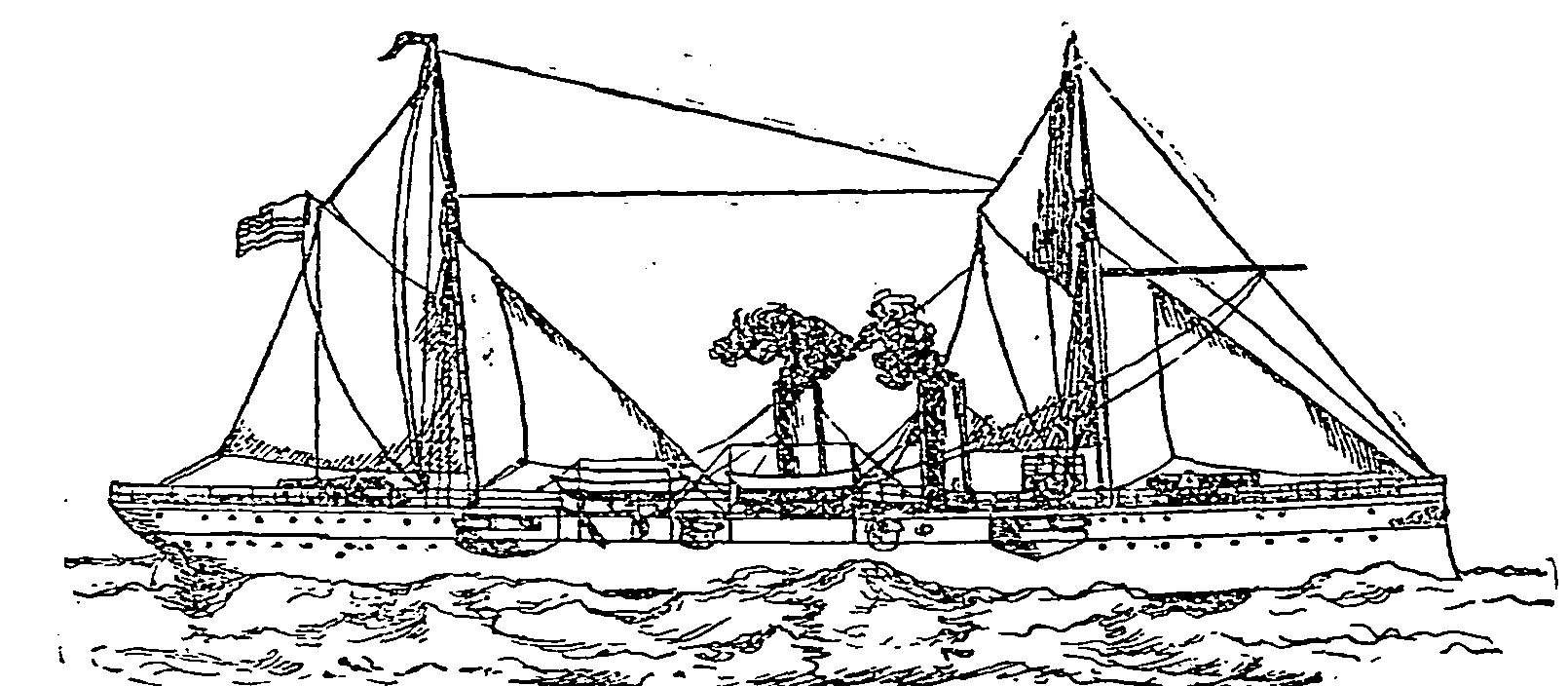
"The War Ship Detroit", 29 January 1894, New York Times.

The affair climaxed on 29 January when Benham ordered commander Brownson to escort the American merchantmen into the wharves, where their cargoes would be unloaded, and to attack the first Brazilian ship to open fire. So at 6:00 am the Detroit headed in, followed by the Julia Rollins, the Agate and the barks Amy and Good News. The Detroit was cleared for action and at 6:20 the crew was at battle stations with guns loaded. But just then, while sailing between Cobras and Enchadas Island, lookouts observed two or three Brazilian auxiliary cruisers which were beginning a bombardment of the federal shore batteries near Santa Barbara Island. Commander Brownson decided to wait for the engagement to end so he did not violate neutrality, and as soon as the armed tugs hauled off the American ships were underway. The Trajano and Guanabara were not far away, the two cruisers were moored to a buoy in line of battle, and Admiral Gama's flagship was nowhere in sight. By 7:00 am, Detroit and her escortees were within gun range of the rebels and at about that time the Trajano fired a warning shot over the Amy's bow which temporarily stopped her. In order to get the ships moving, Commander Brownson had to assure the merchantmen that he would protect them if there was any more fire. An attack came a few minutes later; at 7:04 the Amy received a round from the Trajano's naval musket. Immediately Detroit returned fire with one of her 6-inch (150 mm) guns and a shot hit the Trajano's stern about two or three feet from the starboard bow, causing light damage. Brownson then hailed the Brazilians, who were less than sixty yards away, and the commander declared that "If you fire again l will return the fire, and if you persist in firing I will sink you''. However, Trajano's crew opened fire again with a full broadside from the starboard battery; one near miss went over the Detroit and another over the Amy but no damage was caused.

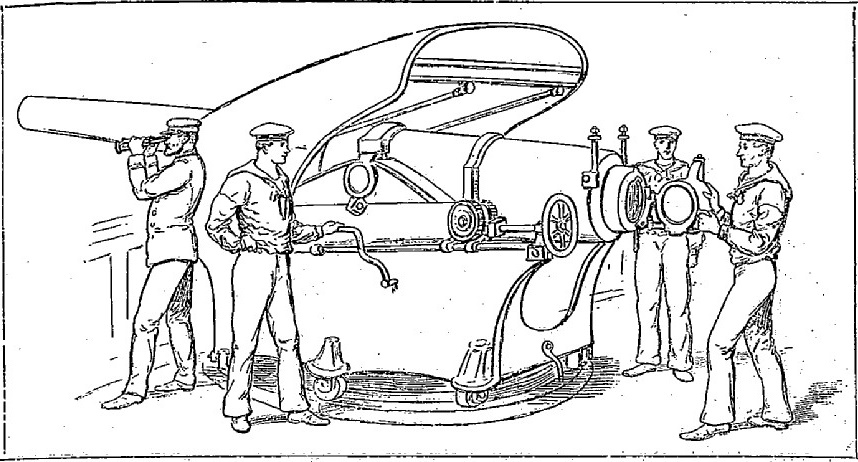
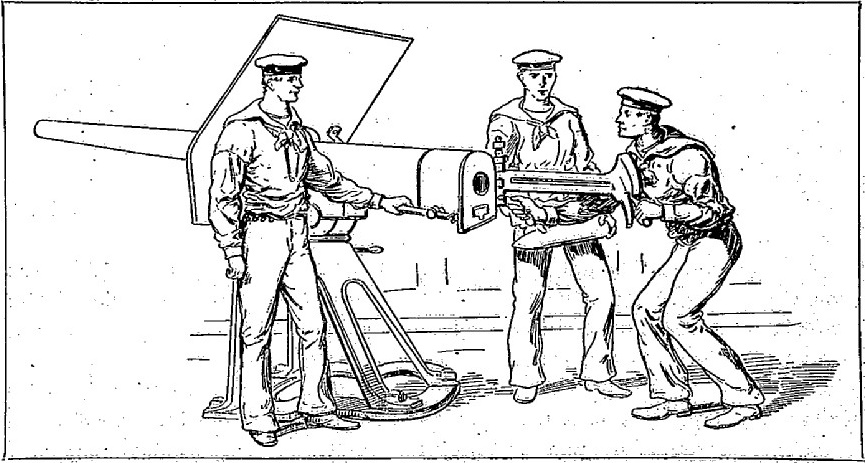
Combat preparations aboard the Detroit (L'Univers Illustré, 1894).

For the next several moments the Detroit maneuvered, and at 7:16 am Brownson found himself in a good position to rake the enemy vessels from 200 yards away. That morning the sea was rough, so the anchor was dropped and preparations were made to slip the cable if necessary. The American barks were directed to continue on to the wharves. At 7:32 am the Trajano fired another broadside at the Amy; all shots missed. USS Detroit responded and a second round struck the Trajano under the counter, near her sternpost. Following this the rebels ceased firing and the engagement was over, after about a half an hour. Admiral Gama only found out that there had been an exchange of fire when he anchored the Liberdade and two of the tugs near the Guanabara. Captain Brownson sent an officer aboard the Liberdade to ensure a ceasefire. Gama said that he had not ordered the attacks on the American barks, and that only blank rounds had been used during the first incidents in order to scare off the merchants and not actually harm them; however minor damage from rifle fire to the Agate and the Julia Rollins proved otherwise. Gama also offered to surrender his fleet to admiral Benham, but the offer was not pursued. American reports make no indication of casualties on either side and the affair did not go any further. In the end, Detroit successfully reopened Rio de Janeiro to American commerce, and Brownson's bold actions are credited with preventing any more attacks on United States flagged ships during the revolt, which ended in March 1894. The captain became known for the engagement, and newspapers across the United States reported the story.

== See also ==
- Bahia Incident
- Callao Affair
- First Battle of Topolobampo
