= USS Marblehead (C-11) =

Montgomery-class unprotected cruiser of the United States Navy

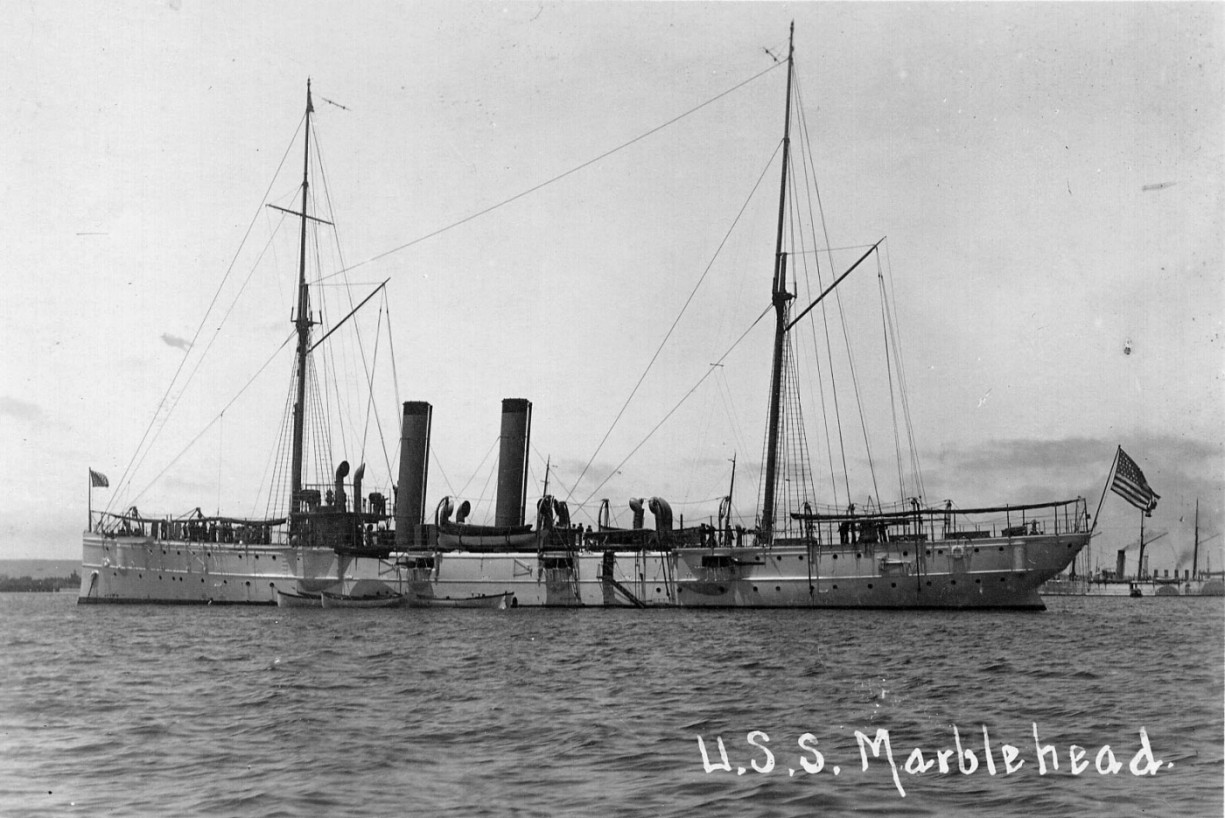
- USS Marblehead (C-11), port quarter view at anchor.

History

United States
- Name: Marblehead
- Namesake: Town of Marblehead, Massachusetts
- Ordered: 7 September 1888
- Awarded: 2 November 1889
- Builder: City Point Iron Works, Boston, Massachusetts
- Cost: $674,000 (contract price of hull and machinery)
- Laid down: October 1890
- Launched: 11 August 1892
- Completed: 11 May 1892
- Acquired: 8 Jan 1894
- Commissioned: 2 April 1894
- Decommissioned: 21 August 1919
- Reclassified: PG-27, 7 July 1920
- Stricken: 5 August 1921
- Identification: Hull symbol:C-11; Hull symbol:PG-27
- Fate: Sold for scrap, 5 August 1921

General characteristics (as built)
- Class & type: Montgomery-class cruiser
- Type: unprotected cruiser
- Displacement: 2,072 long tons (2,105 t) (standard); 2,212 long tons (2,247 t) (full load)
- Length: 269 ft 10 in (82.25 m)
- Beam: 37 ft (11 m)
- Draft: 14 ft 6 in (4.42 m) (mean)
- Installed power: 3 × Double expansion boilers; 2 × Single expansion boilers; 5,400 ihp (4,000 kW)
- Propulsion: 2 × vertical triple expansion reciprocating engines; 2 × screws
- Sail plan: Schooner
- Speed: 18 knots (33 km/h; 21 mph); 18.44 knots (34.15 km/h; 21.22 mph) (Speed on Trial)
- Complement: 30 officers 249 enlisted
- Armament: 2 × 6 in (152 mm)/40 caliber guns; 8 × 5 in (127 mm)/40 caliber guns; 6 × 6-pounder (57 mm (2.2 in)) guns; 2 × 1-pounder (37 mm (1.5 in)) guns; 2 × Gatling guns; 3 × 18 inch (450 mm) Torpedo tubes
- Armor: Deck: 7/16 in (11 mm) (slope); 5/16 in (7.9 mm) (flat); Conning Tower: 2 in (51 mm)

General characteristics (1920)
- Armament: 8 × 4 in (102 mm)/40 caliber guns; 1 × 3 in (76 mm)/50 caliber anti-aircraft guns

The second USS Marblehead (C-11/PG-27) was a Montgomery-class unprotected cruiser in the United States Navy, authorized in the naval appropriations bill of September 7, 1888. Marblehead served in the Spanish–American War and World War I, and was the last ship of her class in service.

Marblehead was laid down in October 1890 by City Point Iron Works, Boston, Massachusetts; launched 11 August 1892; sponsored by Mrs. C. F. Allen; and commissioned 2 April 1894, Commander Charles O'Neil in command. She was named for the seaport Marblehead, Massachusetts.

== Service history ==
=== Pre-Spanish–American War ===
Assigned to the North Atlantic Station, Marblehead departed New York 6 June 1894, for the Caribbean in response to a change of government in Nicaragua. The ship arrived in port 19 June at Bluefields and found that city to be the point of greatest danger. On 7 July, in response to dispatches from the American consul, she put ashore a landing party of Marines and bluejackets to protect American interests. Reinforced by a second party 31 July, this force remained ashore until 7 August. Five days later, Marblehead departed Bluefields to continue cruising the Caribbean, showing the flag in Latin American waters until 26 November, when she departed Port Royal, Jamaica, for Hampton Roads, Virginia, arriving on 6 December.

The cruiser stood out from Norfolk 4 March 1895, for duty on the European Station. Sailing via the Azores, the ship arrived at Gibraltar 31 March. During April and May, she cruised the Mediterranean, spending much time on patrol in Syrian waters, and then steamed for Germany to represent the U.S. at the 20 June opening of the Kiel Canal. For the next five months, the ship cruised along the coast of western Europe and in the Mediterranean steaming over 11,000 mi (18,000 km) and visiting more than 40 foreign ports. Marblehead then returned to the U.S., anchoring at Tompkinsville, New York 23 November 1896. On 1 February 1897, the ship was again assigned to the North Atlantic Station, and for the remainder of the year cruised the east coast and the Caribbean in training.

=== Spanish–American War ===
At the outbreak of the Spanish–American War, Marblehead was at Key West, Florida. Immediately sailing for Cuban waters, she arrived off Havana 23 April 1898, and then proceeded to Cienfuegos where she shelled enemy vessels and fortifications on 29 April, in support of the invasion of Guantánamo Bay. After joining the blockading squadron, she cut the cables off Cienfuegos on 11 May, when many of her sailors and Marines received Medals of Honor, including seaman Anton Olsen.

She then patrolled off Santiago de Cuba until early June. In company with the auxiliary cruiser Yankee, Marblehead captured the lower part of Guantánamo Bay as a base for the fleet 7 June, and supported the landing of a battalion of Marines there three days later. Continuing operations in the bay, she helped the pre-dreadnought battleship Texas destroy the Spanish fort on Cayo del Toro on 15 June.

On July 26 and 27 she assisted in the clearing of 27 contact mines from Guantanamo Bay, for which three of her crew members, Chief Carpenter's Mate Axel Sundquist, Boatswains Mate Second Class William H. Morin and Ordinary Seaman Samuel Triplett, received the Medal of Honor.

The ship remained in Cuban waters until 2 September, when she sailed for the St. Lawrence River on 20 October to participate in ceremonies opening the Champlain Monument in Quebec.

=== Pre–World War I ===
Marblehead repaired at Boston Navy Yard from 2 November 1898 to 9 February 1899, and, following a brief cruise to the Caribbean, proceeded through the Straits of Magellan 16 June to join the Pacific Squadron on 4 July. She cruised off the coast of South America, Mexico, and California until she decommissioned at Mare Island Navy Yard, 30 April 1900.

She was recommissioned 10 November 1902, to devote the next four years to cruising along the west coast of North and South America, from Alaska to Chile on training and protocol missions. On 9 January 1903 she collided with Pomona in San Francisco Bay in dense fog, doing $2,500 in damage to Pomona. From October 1903 to March 1904, she served as flagship of Rear Admiral Henry Glass, Commander of the Pacific Squadron. The cruiser decommissioned at Mare Island Navy Yard 1 October 1906, and remained at the yard until 31 March 1910, when she was loaned to the California Naval Militia as a training ship. She was placed in commission in reserve, 22 July 1911, and in 1916 was turned over to the Oregon Naval Militia as training ship for that state.

=== World War I ===
Marblehead was again placed in full commission 6 April 1917, at the Puget Sound Navy Yard, and 4 May was ordered to the Pacific Patrol Force. She was employed on convoy, patrol, and survey duty, operating off Mexico and in search of possible German raiders in the California area until 11 June 1918, when she proceeded via the Panama Canal to Key West for duty with the American patrol detachment. Arriving at Key West 22 June, the ship spent the remainder of World War I in the Caribbean, engaged in escort and patrol duty. Detached from patrol duty 4 December, the cruiser steamed to join Division 2, Pacific Fleet. She arrived Mare Island 17 February 1919, and decommissioned 21 August. Reclassified PG-27 in July 1920, Marblehead was sold 5 August 1921.

== Bibliography ==
- Grobmeier, Alvin H. (1990). "Question 2/89". Warship International. XXVII (2): 198–199. ISSN 0043-0374.
