= William Morin =

William Morin may refer to:

- William H. Morin (1869–1935), United States Navy officer
- Will Morin, Canadian politician
