= USS Yosemite =

USS Yosemite may refer to more than one United States Navy ship:

- USS Yosemite (1892), an auxiliary cruiser that fought in the Spanish–American War, in commission from 1898 until scuttled in 1900
- USS Yosemite (1894), a steamer in commission from 1911 to 1912
- USS Yosemite (CM-2), a minelayer which bore the name from 1931 to 1939 while out of commission in reserve; formerly USS Tahoe (CM-2), and before that was the protected cruiser USS San Francisco (C-5, later CM-2)
- USS Yosemite (AD-19), a destroyer tender in commission from 1944 to 1994
