= USS Montgomery (C-9) =

United States Navy cruiser, launched 1891

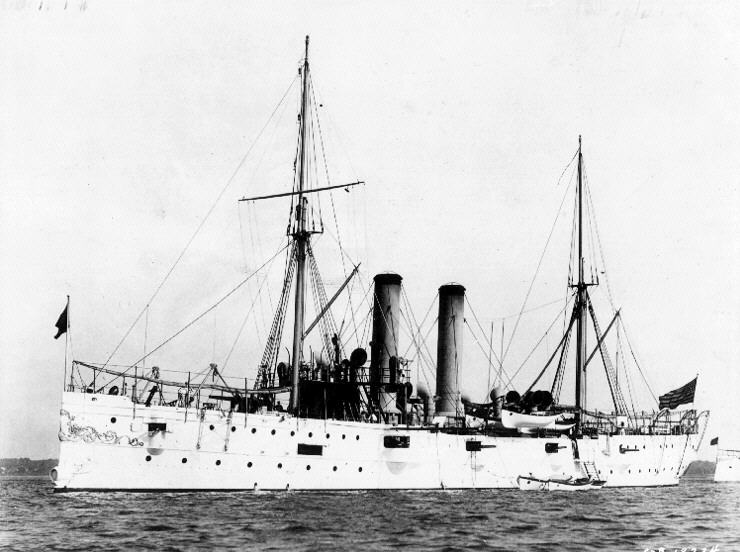
- USS Montgomery (C-9), port bow view, circa 1894–99.

History

United States
- Name: Montgomery (1894–1918); Anniston (1918–1919)
- Namesake: City of Montgomery, Alabama; City of Anniston, Alabama
- Ordered: 7 September 1888
- Awarded: 2 November 1889
- Builder: Columbian Iron Works and Dry Dock Co., Baltimore, Maryland
- Cost: $1,037,923 (hull and machinery)
- Laid down: February 1890
- Launched: 5 December 1891
- Sponsored by: Miss Sophia Smith
- Commissioned: 21 June 1894
- Decommissioned: 16 May 1918
- Renamed: Anniston, 14 March 1918
- Stricken: 25 August 1919
- Identification: Hull symbol:C-9
- Fate: Sold for scrap, 14 November 1919

General characteristics (as built)
- Class & type: Montgomery-class cruiser
- Type: unprotected cruiser
- Displacement: 2,072 long tons (2,105 t) (standard); 2,212 long tons (2,247 t) (full load)
- Length: 269 ft 10 in (82.25 m)
- Beam: 37 ft (11 m)
- Draft: 14 ft 6 in (4.42 m) (mean)
- Installed power: 6 × Almy Water tube boilers; 5,400 ihp (4,000 kW)
- Propulsion: 2 × vertical triple expansion reciprocating engines; 2 × screws
- Sail plan: Schooner
- Speed: 17 knots (31 km/h; 20 mph); 19.06 kn (21.93 mph; 35.30 km/h) (Speed on Trial)
- Complement: 30 officers 249 enlisted
- Armament: 2 × 6 in (152 mm)/40 caliber guns; 8 × 5 in (127 mm)/40 caliber guns; 6 × 6-pounder (57 mm (2.2 in)) guns; 2 × 1-pounder (37 mm (1.5 in)) guns; 2 × Gatling guns; 3 × 18 inch (450 mm) Torpedo tubes
- Armor: Deck: 7/16 in (11 mm) (slope); 5/16 in (7.9 mm) (flat); Conning Tower: 2 in (51 mm)

General characteristics (1914)
- Armament: 2 × 6-pounder (57 mm (2.2 in)) guns; 1 × 21 inch (533 mm) submerged torpedo tube; 1 × 18 in (457 mm) submerged torpedo tube; 1 × 21 in (533 mm) above water torpedo tube; 1 × 18 in (457 mm) above water torpedo tube

The fourth USS Montgomery (C-9), the lead ship of her class, was an unprotected cruiser in the United States Navy authorized in the Naval Appropriations Act of September 7, 1888. Montgomery served during the Spanish–American War and in World War I and was named for Montgomery, Alabama.

Montgomery was launched 5 December 1891 by Columbian Iron Works, Baltimore, Maryland; sponsored by Miss Sophia Smith; and commissioned at Norfolk Navy Yard 21 June 1894.

== Service history ==
Assigned to the North Atlantic Squadron, the new cruiser operated along the eastern seaboard and in the Caribbean. During the Spanish–American War, she cruised near Cuba and Haiti in April 1898 and in May joined the blockade of Havana. She took two prizes, Lorenzo and Frasquito, 5 May, and shelled the Spanish forts a week later. On 13 June a 280mm Krupp gun at the Santa Clara Battery fired on Montgomery, at a range of 9,000 meters, apparently without effect.

In April 1899 Montgomery transferred to the South Atlantic Squadron and operated along the Atlantic coast of South America . In July 1900 she was import Urgaguy with CDR JohnMerrill as her Commanding Officer. (US Census 2 July 1900, lists crew members.) She returning to the United States and decommissioning at New York City 15 September 1900. Recommissioned 15 May 1902, she was assigned to the Caribbean Division, North Atlantic Squadron, and operated in the West Indies until decommissioning at Philadelphia, Pennsylvania 15 September 1904.

Montgomery recommissioned 2 January 1908 and operated in the 5th Naval District as a torpedo experimental ship. From 1914 to 1918 she served with the Maryland Naval Militia. Renamed Anniston 14 March 1918, she was assigned to Division 2, American Patrol Detachment, for patrol and escort duty along the Atlantic coast and in the Caribbean.

Decommissioning at Charleston, South Carolina, 16 May 1918, Anniston was struck from the Navy list 25 August 1919 and sold 14 November 1919.
