= 5-inch/40-caliber gun =

5″/40 caliber Marks 2, 3, and 4 Naval Gun
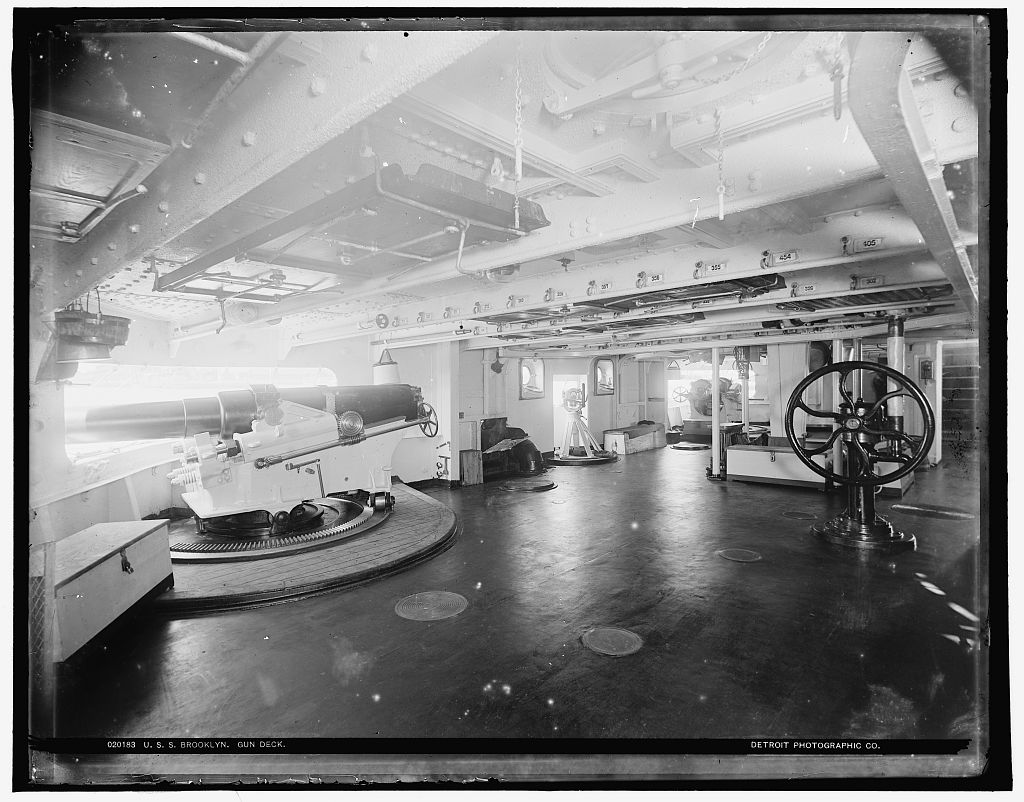
- Brooklyn, gundeck, with 5-inch/40 caliber gun
- Type: Naval gun
- Place of origin: United States

Service history
- In service: 1895–1923
- Used by: United States Navy
- Wars: Spanish–American War

Production history
- Designer: Bureau of Ordnance
- Designed: 1895
- Manufacturer: U.S. Naval Gun Factory
- No. built: Mark 2: 68 (Nos. 3–70); Mark 3: 119 (Nos. 87–199, 287–292); Mark 4: 16 (Nos. 71–86)
- Variants: Mark 2 Mods 0–8, Mark 3 Mods 0–3, Mark 4 Mods 0–4

Specifications
- Mass: Mark 2: 7,000 lb (3,200 kg) (without breech); Mark 2: 7,080 lb (3,210 kg) (with breech); Marks 3 and 4: 7,096 lb (3,219 kg) (without breech); Marks 3 and 4: 7,260 lb (3,290 kg) (with breech)
- Length: Mark 2:206 in (5,200 mm); Marks 3 and 4:205.83 in (5,228 mm)
- Barrel length: 200 in (5,100 mm) bore (40 calibers)
- Shell: 50 lb (23 kg)
- Caliber: 5 in (127 mm)
- Traverse: 137° arc (Brooklyn casemates); −150° to +150° (open mounts)
- Rate of fire: 12 rounds per minute
- Muzzle velocity: 2,300 ft/s (700 m/s)
- Effective firing range: 8,500 yd (7,800 m) at 15° elevation
- Maximum firing range: 16,000 yd (15,000 m) at 30° elevation

The 5″/40 caliber gun (spoken "five-inch-forty-caliber") were used in the secondary batteries of the United States Navy's early battleships, armored cruisers, protected cruisers, unprotected cruisers, and auxiliary cruisers.

== Design ==
The Mark 2, Nos. 3 – 70, was a 40 caliber naval gun that fired semi-fixed ammunition. The Mark 2 consisted of tube, jacket, and 2 hoops, being hooped to 68.5 inches (1,740 mm) from the muzzle. The Mod 1 had different exterior dimensions for the hoops and chase and was primarily intended to be used with the Mark 2 Mods 1 and 4 mounts. Mod 2 had a cylindrical jacket that was 15.5 inches (390 mm) in diameter for 2.75 inches (70 mm) to the rear of the mounting threads. It was intended for the Mark 2 Mods 1 and 4 and Mark 3 Mods 1 and 6 mounts. Mod 3 was the same as the Mod 2 but without the cylindrical section. It was designed to use the Mark 2 Mods 1, 2, 4, and 5 and the Mark 3 Mods 1, 4, 6, and 9 mounts. The Mod 4 only differed from the Mark 3 in that it had a muzzle bell. Mod 5, gun No. 39, was an experimental gun that had 25 inches (640 mm) cut off of the muzzle, making it a 35-caliber gun. It also had a locking hoop that extended the whole length of the chase hoop to help balance the gun. The Mod 6 was a Mod 4 gun that had been modified for use in the 5-inch Mark 8 Mods 4, 13, and 14 mounts. The breech was turned down a 0.25 inches (6.4 mm) to 16.25 inches (413 mm) for 13.435 inches (341.2 mm) from the face of the breech with the front part of the thread for the sleeve cut away. The Mod 7 gun was a Mod 2, 3, or 4 that had a conical nickel-steel liner and a Mod 8 was a Mod 6 gun also with a conical nickel-steel liner. The first gun that was delivered in October 1890 was gun No. 5. The Mark 2 was intended for use on battleships and cruisers, such as Olympia, Cincinnati-class protected cruisers, Montgomery-class unprotected cruisers, and auxiliary cruisers such as Yosemite.

The Mark 3, gun Nos. 87–199, 287–292, were first delivered in January 1897. The Mark 3 was also a semi-fixed ammunition gun that was designed for use on cruisers and battleships. The Mark three was constructed of a tube, jacket and two hoops, all of gun steel with a side-swing carrier type breech. Mod 1 used a different jacket with a locking hoop forward of the slide cylinder. Mod 2 was a Mod 0 or Mod 1 gun relined using a conical nickel-steel liner. Gun No. 104 was converted into and experimental Mod 3 gun from a Mod 0, being cut down to 25-caliber or 75.39 inches (1,915 mm), for use as an anti-aircraft gun. The muzzle end was cut off and a conical nickel-steel liner installed, this gave it the same characteristics as a 5″/25 caliber Mark 10 anti-aircraft gun. The gun later ruptured during testing. The muzzle of gun No. 174, mounted on the battleship Kearsarge, also had its muzzle blow off.

The Mark 4, guns No. 71–86, delivered in April 1896, were derived from the Mark 2 but 0.17 inches (4.3 mm) longer and consequent differences in slide surface and other externals. Mod 1 added a nickel-steel tube and hoops that the Mod 0 didn't have and the Mod 3 was the Mod 1 relined with a nickel-steel liner. With the Mod 4 an attempt was made to thread the gun to fit the Mark 2 Mod 4 mount but wasn't used. This gun was designed to arm small cruisers and many were used to arm auxiliaries during WW I.

== Naval Service ==
Ship	Gun Installed	Gun Mount
USS Kearsarge (BB-5)	Mark 3: 14 × 5″/40 caliber (Nos. 94, 167–179)	Unknown
USS Kentucky (BB-6)	Mark 3: 14 × 5″/40 caliber (Nos. 181–194)	Unknown
USS Brooklyn (ACR-3)	Mark 3: 12 × 5″/40 caliber (Nos. 90, 92–93, 96–100, 135–138)	Unknown
USS Chicago (1885)	Mark 3: 14 × 5″/40 caliber (Nos. 144, 146–158) (1898 refit)	Unknown
USS San Francisco (C-5)	Mark 3: 2 × 5″/40 caliber (Nos. 88, 91) (1911 refit)	Unknown
USS Olympia (C-6)	Mark 2: 10 × 5″/40 caliber (Nos. 33, 34, 36–42, 58)	Mk.8
USS Cincinnati (C-7)	Mark 2: 10 × 5″/40 caliber	Unknown
USS Raleigh (C-8)	Mark 2: 10 × 5″/40 caliber	Unknown
USS Montgomery (C-9)	Mark 2: 8 × 5″/40 caliber	Unknown
USS Detroit (C-10)	Mark 2: 8 × 5″/40 caliber	Unknown
USS Marblehead (C-11)	Mark 2: 8 × 5″/40 caliber	Unknown
USS Buffalo (1893)	Mark 3: 2 × 5″/40 caliber (Nos. 112–113)	Unknown
USS Dixie (1893)	Mark 3: 8 × 5″/40 caliber (Nos. 88, 91, 95, 101–102, 105, 107–108)	Unknown
USS Yosemite (1892)	Mark 3: 1 × 5″/40 caliber (Nos. 119); Mark 2: 6 × 5″/40 caliber (Nos. 61–66)	Unknown
USS Don Juan de Austria	Mark 3: 4 × 5″/40 caliber (Nos. 161–164)	Unknown

Marks 2–4 were used on many auxiliaries during World War I.
