= Kalmus Calmann Lévy =

French editor

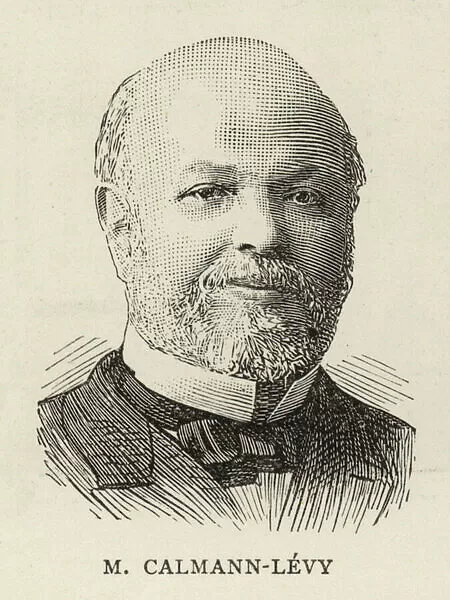
M. Calmann- Lévy, in 1890

Kalmus "Calmann" Lévy (29 March 1819, Phalsbourg – 18 June 1891, Paris) was the founder of Calmann-Lévy, one of the oldest French publishing houses.

== Biography ==
Kalmus Lévy was born in Phalsbourg, he was the son of Simon Lévy and Pauline Lévy. Simon Lévy was an Alsatian Jewish colporteur (a peddler of printed publications) who moved to a poor neighbourhood in Paris in 1825. Kalmus and his brother Michel were the youngest of five children. Until 1825, Kalmus and Michel studied in a primary school of the Israelite Consistory of the Seine.

In 1836, Michel created the Michel Lévy Frères editions, which quickly published the greatest French writers. After Michel's death in 1875, Kalmus took over the management of the company and changed his first name to Calmann. Michel Lévy frères editions became Calmann-Lévy editions. Calmann Lévy died in 1893 and his sons succeeded him at the head of Calmann-Lévy.

== Bibliography ==
- Jean-Yves Mollier. Michel & Calmann Lévy ou la naissance de l'édition moderne 1836-1891. Calmann-Lévy: Paris, 1984. ISBN 2702151000, ISBN 9782702151006
