= Callao affair =

1820 event in the Peruvian War of Independence

- Part of the Peruvian War of Independence
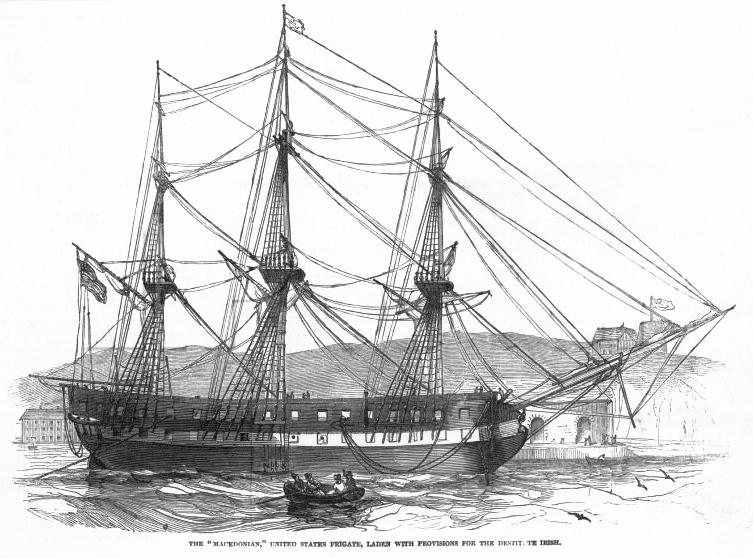
- The rebuilt USS Macedonian in Ireland during the Great Famine.
Date	November 5–6, 1820
Location	Callao, Peru, Pacific Ocean
Result	Spanish vow to punish those responsible for attacks on American shipping.

Belligerents
United States	Spain

Commanders and leaders
(United States Navy) John Downes	(Spain) Joaquin de la Pezuela

Strength
1 frigate 6 schooners	1 fort

Casualties and losses
2 killed 6 wounded 1 frigate damaged 2 schooners damaged	None

The Callao affair occurred in November 1820, during the Peruvian War of Independence. It began when a Spanish fort opened fire on the United States warship USS Macedonian. Though the ship was damaged, the Americans did not violate their neutrality by counterattacking. On the following day, a boat filled with United States Navy sailors was attacked, resulting in the deaths of two seamen and the wounding of eight others. Two days after that, an American merchant ship was attacked and her crew had to abandon ship. Ultimately, there was no significant response by the United States to the attacks on their shipping and their citizens, though the Spanish government vowed to punish the perpetrators.

== Affair ==
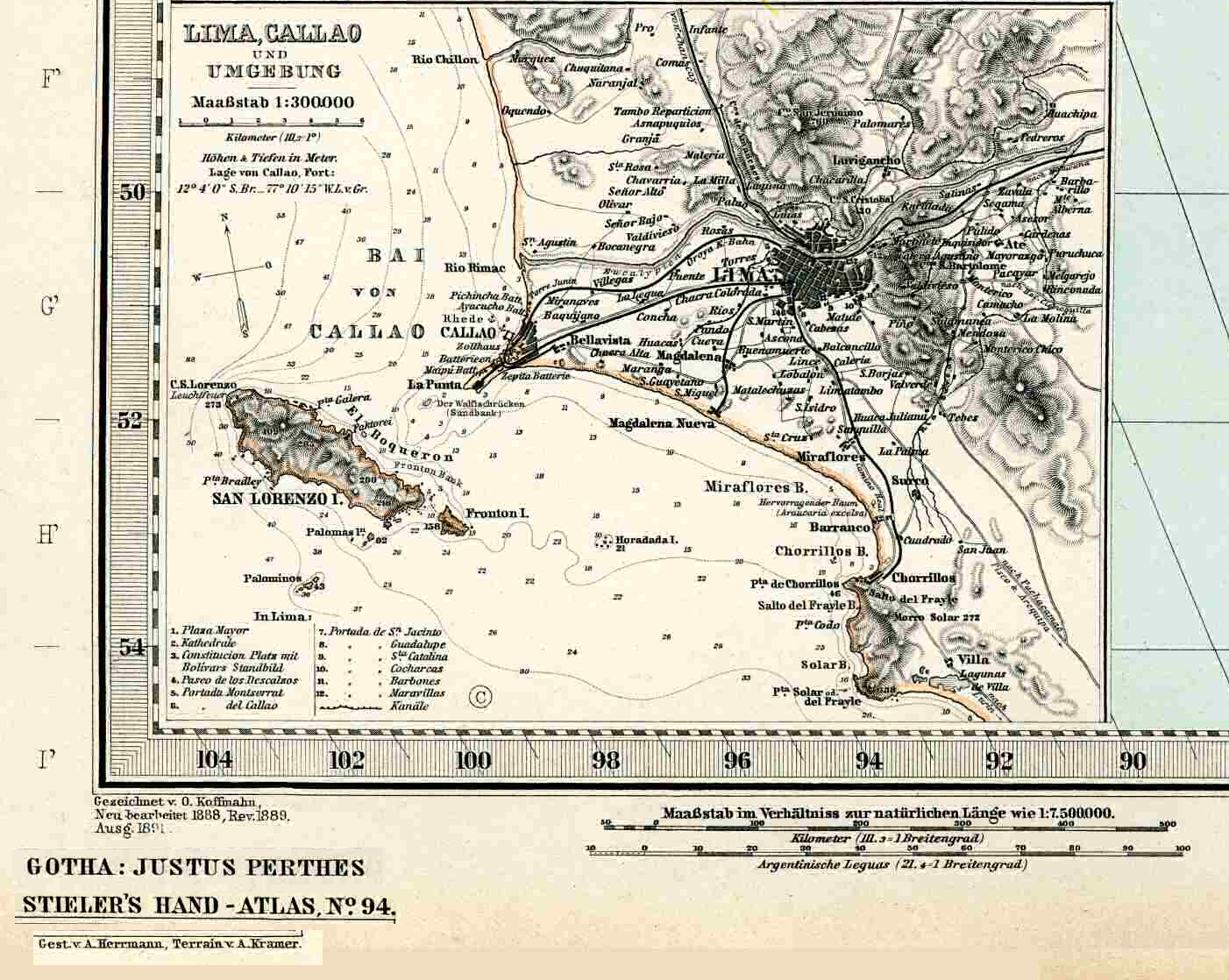
A 19th century map of Peru showing the location of Fortaleza Real Felipe and the batteries which fired on USS Macedonian.

Inspired by the French revolution in 1789, and the Peruvian revolution, the people of Chile joined forces with the rebel Peruvians and revolted against Spanish authority in 1820. As result, a rebel First Chilean Navy Squadron under Scottish Captain Thomas Cochrane attacked the Spanish fleet anchored off Callao on the night of November 5, during which the rebels captured the 44 gun frigate Esmeralda with heavy loss of life to the Spanish defenders. The capture of the ship crippled Spain's operational capabilities in the Pacific Ocean and infuriated the Royalist inhabitants of Callao. During the battle, the frigate USS Macedonian, under Captain John Downes, was also at port with the mission of protecting six American merchant schooners which were being harassed by both the Chilean fleet and the Spanish on shore. Because the Macedonian was so close to the battle area, the Spanish military in Callao assumed that she had supported Cochrane's fleet in the attack. So instead of aiming for the Chilean ships, the garrison opened fire on the frigate and one of the American merchantmen with hot shot from Fortaleza Real Felipe. Multiple rounds ripped through the ships' rigging though the damage was repairable and no Americans were harmed.

The Macedonian's carpenter, Samuel Holbrook, later described the incident; "Their shot flew round us like hail, cutting away our cross-jack yard, and much of our rigging. Many of the red hot shot struck near us." Captain Downes was in Lima at the time and a first lieutenant was in command and he ordered the sails hoisted to bring the vessel out of the fort's range. On the following day, the lieutenant sent the tender Buckskin filled with sailors into port for provisions. However, while the sailors were still heading to shore, Spanish troops at the docks opened fire, killing two men and wounding six others. Holbrook described the scene; "blood and brain scattered round the inside as though a bullock had been killed in her." There was no landing as some sources claim and the survivors went back to their ship without obtaining the fresh food they were looking for.

At the same time that the Macedonian sailors were attacked, American and British merchantmen were being looted in the port and two days later, on November 8, the American schooner Rampart was attacked by the fort and heavily damaged while trying to offload her cargo, forcing her crew to abandon ship. The Macedonian also took on board that day several American and British refugees who were in fear of being killed by the natives. Captain Downes was still not interested in exacting redress for the three incidents but he did send the Spanish Viceroy Joaquin de la Pezuela a letter of protest.

== Aftermath ==
Pezuela said he would punish those responsible but whether he actually did so or not remains unknown. Due to the blockade, Captain Downes was afraid his ship would be seized as it was illegally carrying over a million dollars in Spanish gold, something Cochrane's spies had informed him of some time prior. So, when the Americans were leaving Callao, they expected to have to fight their way past the Chilean fleet, but Cochrane ignored the frigate and let it go without any opposition. Captain Downes remained off the South American coast until March 1821 to protect American merchant sailors, many of whom were either imprisoned by the viceroy, or murdered by the Spanish military and their Peruvian subjects. The murder and imprisonment of United States citizens at Lima and Callao was attributed to the fact that some of the victims were captured from ships of Cochrane's fleet and were legally prisoners of war, though many of the American victims were not involved in the conflict and were killed along with other innocent foreigners. In the end, there was no retaliation by the United States in response to the attacks on their vessels or their citizens, other than the feeble letter of protest from Downes.

== See also ==
- Bahia incident
- Rio de Janeiro Affair

== Bibliography ==
- Glenn, Myra C. (2010). Jack Tar's Story: The Autobiographies and Memoirs of Sailors in Antebellum America. Cambridge University Press. ISBN 978-0-521-19368-9.
- De Kay, James T. (2000). Chronicles of the Frigate Macedonian, 1809–1922. W. W. Norton & Company. ISBN 0-393-32024-3.
- Long, David F. (1988). Gold braid and foreign relations: diplomatic activities of U.S. naval officers, 1798–1883. US Naval Institute Press. ISBN 0-87021-228-1.
