= USS Raleigh (C-8) =

Cincinnati class cruiser

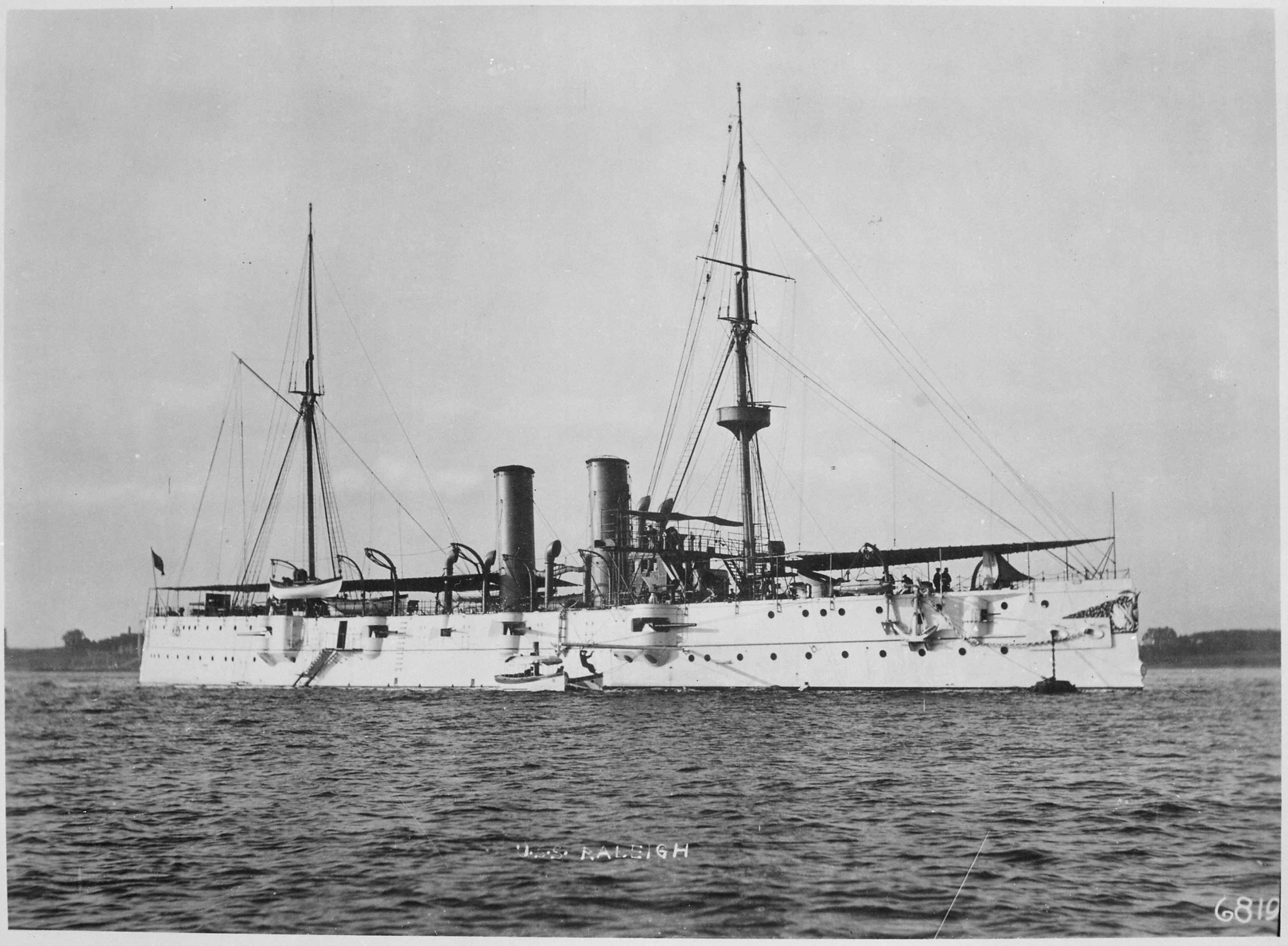
- USS Raleigh (C-8), starboard bow view.

History

United States
- Name: Raleigh
- Namesake: City of Raleigh, North Carolina
- Ordered: 7 September 1888
- Builder: Norfolk Navy Yard, Virginia
- Cost: $1,100,000
- Laid down: 19 December 1889
- Launched: 31 March 1892
- Sponsored by: Mrs. Alfred W. Haywood
- Commissioned: 17 April 1894
- Decommissioned: 21 April 1919
- Stricken: 5 August 1921
- Identification: Hull symbol:C-8
- Fate: 5 August 1921, sold for scrap to Henry A. Hitner's Sons Co., Philadelphia, Pa.

General characteristics (as built)
- Class & type: Cincinnati-class protected cruiser
- Displacement: 3,183 long tons (3,234 t) (standard); 3,339 long tons (3,393 t) (full load)
- Length: 305 ft 10 in (93.22 m)
- Beam: 42 ft (13 m)
- Draft: 18 ft (5.5 m) (mean) 20 ft 2 in (6.15 m) (max)
- Installed power: 6 × steam boilers; 10,000 ihp (7,500 kW)
- Propulsion: 2 × vertical triple expansion reciprocating engines; 2 × screws
- Sail plan: Schooner
- Speed: 19 knots (35 km/h; 22 mph); 21.12 kn (24.30 mph; 39.11 km/h) (speed on trial)
- Complement: 32 officers 270 enlisted
- Armament: 1 × 6 in (152 mm)/40 caliber guns; 10 × 5 in (127 mm)/40 caliber guns; 8 × 6-pounder (57 mm (2.2 in)) guns; 2 × 1-pounder (37 mm (1.5 in)) guns; 4 × 18 inch (450 mm) torpedo tubes
- Armor: Deck: 2.5 in (64 mm) (slope); 1 in (25 mm) (flat); Conning Tower: 2 in (51 mm); Gun Sponsons: 4 in (100 mm)

General characteristics (1914)
- Installed power: 8 × Babcock & Wilcox boilers; 4,500 ihp (3,400 kW)
- Speed: 18 knots (33 km/h; 21 mph)
- Armament: 11 × 5 in (130 mm)/40 caliber guns; 6 × 6-pounder (57 mm (2.2 in)) guns

USS Raleigh (C-8) was a United States Navy protected cruiser of the Cincinnati class, commissioned in 1894 and in periodic service until 1919.

The second ship named Raleigh, was laid down on 19 December 1889 at the Norfolk Navy Yard, Portsmouth, Virginia; launched 31 March 1892; sponsored by Mrs. Alfred W. Haywood; and commissioned on 17 April 1894. The ship was named after the City of Raleigh, the capital of North Carolina.

== Pre-Spanish–American War ==
Remaining in the yard for another five months, Raleigh shifted to Hampton Roads in early September, then conducted shakedown in Chesapeake Bay. In January 1895, she completed fitting out at the torpedo station at Newport, Rhode Island, and on the 25th put to sea to join the North Atlantic Squadron for battle practice in the Caribbean. In June, she put into New York, whence she moved south again for a cruise around the Florida peninsula; and in August, she returned to New York for voyage repairs before resuming operations with her squadron. For the next 10 months, she continued operations in the western Atlantic, ranging from New England to the Straits of Florida.

During the summer of 1896, she trained Naval Militiamen from South Carolina and Louisiana, then returned to the east coast and North Atlantic Squadron exercises. From late October 1896-early February 1897, she joined in a neutrality patrol off Florida, and in April, after the completion of an overhaul at Norfolk, participated in ceremonies marking the dedication of Grant's Tomb.

On 6 May, Raleigh steamed east, and on 11 June reported for duty on the European Station at Smyrna (now Izmir) on the Aegean Sea. In July, she participated in a good-will tour of Moroccan ports. In August, she cruised off Italy, then returned to the western Mediterranean. Into December, she operated off the Levant and, toward the end of the month transited the Suez Canal en route to the Asiatic Station. On 18 February 1898, she reached Hong Kong where she joined Dewey's squadron.

== Spanish–American War ==
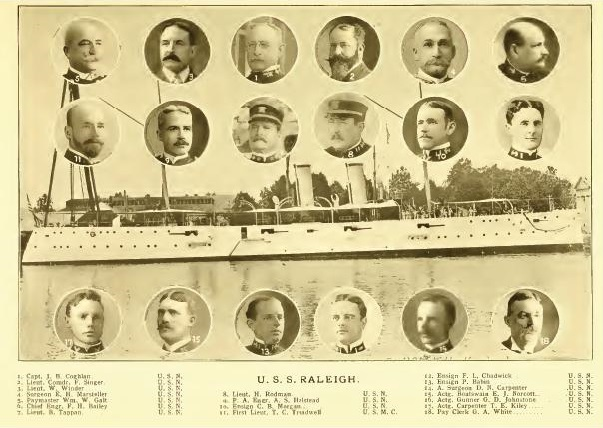
USS Raleigh (C-8) and her officers in 1898.

On 26 April, the US Congress declared war against Spain. On the 27th the squadron got underway for Manila.

At the end of the month, Raleigh passed El Fraile Island and was fired on by an enemy battery. With Concord and Boston, she returned the fire, then moved toward Cavite to engage the Spanish fleet. Raleigh is credited with firing the first shot of the Battle of Manila Bay from a 5-inch/40 caliber gun.

Steaming in column, the American squadron ran by the Spanish, firing at close range. Two hours later, five cross runs had been completed, and the Spanish fleet had been destroyed. Shore batteries became the targets. Just before noon on 1 May, Raleigh joined Olympia, Boston, and Petrel in silencing the navy yard and arsenal batteries. On 2 May, she sent officers ashore to demand the surrender of Corregidor and, on the 3rd, sent men to disable the batteries there and destroy the munitions. In the late afternoon, shore parties were sent to Palo Caballo for the same purpose. Raleigh then took up picket and patrol duties, capturing the gunboat Callao on the 12th.

In July, Raleigh shifted from Manila Bay to Subic Bay. On the 7th, she shelled Spanish positions on Grande Island until they surrendered; she then sent garrison troops ashore. On the 10th, she returned to Manila, where she remained until after the Spanish surrendered the city in mid-August.

== Pre-World War I ==
On the 25th, Raleigh put to sea, bound for Hong Kong with mail. In early September, she returned to the Philippines where she operated until sailing for Suez, Gibraltar, and the United States on 15 December. On 15 April 1899, she arrived at New York and the next day received honors from other ships and from officials of the city.

10 days after her arrival, Raleigh cleared New York Harbor and turned south. On the 26th, she entered the Delaware River and moved up to Philadelphia, where on the 28th, President William McKinley and Secretary of the Navy John Davis Long came on board to honor the ship and crew for a job well done.

On 2 May, Raleigh got underway again, and, after visiting ports in the Carolinas, put into Portsmouth, New Hampshire, where she was decommissioned on 10 June.

Recommissioned on 5 January 1903, Raleigh was fitted out at New York and in mid-March sailed for Honduras. There, she delivered stores to ships cruising off that coast, then headed east. Steaming via Gibraltar and Suez, she rejoined the Asiatic Fleet at Chefoo, China, on 26 August.

For the next four years she cruised in Korean, Chinese, Japanese, and Philippine waters in support of diplomatic missions as well as showing the flag and conducting good-will tours. One of Raleigh's sailors, Chief Carpenter's Mate Robert Klein, received the Medal of Honor for his actions during a 25 January 1904 incident in which he rescued shipmates who had been overcome by turpentine fumes in a double bottom compartment. On 12 August 1907, she departed Yokosuka for San Francisco. Arriving on 6 September, she proceeded to Mare Island to begin inactivation.

Decommissioned on 12 October 1907, Raleigh was recommissioned on 21 February 1911. Initially assigned to the Pacific Reserve Squadron, she remained in San Francisco until December. She then moved north to Bremerton, Washington, and two more years of little activity.

On 6 December 1913, she departed Puget Sound. Steaming south, she joined the active fleet and served as a station ship in Mexican ports, primarily Manzanillo, Mazatlán, La Paz, and Guaymas for the next four years. During the time she interrupted her Mexican assignments twice: for duty at Ocos, Guatemala from 6–25 October 1915; and at Corinto, Nicaragua from 1 April-26 July 1916.

== World War I and beyond ==
Undergoing repairs at Mare Island when the United States entered World War I, Raleigh departed San Francisco in early May 1917, and on 5 June joined the Patrol Force, Atlantic Fleet, at Newport, R.I. Assigned to Cruiser Force, 2nd Squadron, she patrolled from Boston to Norfolk until November when she was detached for duty in Brazilian waters.

On 12 December, Raleigh arrived at Rio de Janeiro, and until 27 April 1918 she patrolled between there and Bahia (Salvador). In May, she arrived off West Africa; delivered munitions to the Liberian Government; continued on to Dakar, French West Africa, then headed west on 18 May. At the end of the month, she resumed Bahia-Rio patrols.

A panoramic view of Raleigh as she lies at anchor off 27th Street, North River, 17 April 1899.

At the same time, however, German U-boats appeared off the east coast of the United States. Raleigh was ordered home.

Clearing Bahia on 26 June, she joined the American Patrol Detachment at Key West, Florida, on 21 July and began guarding convoys in the Gulf of Mexico, in the Caribbean, and off the east coast of the Carolinas. She remained on that duty until after the end of the war, and into 1919 continued operations out of Key West. On 6 April, she entered the Charleston Navy Yard and prepared for inactivation. On 21 April, she was decommissioned for the last time, and on 5 August 1921 she was sold for scrapping to Henry A. Hitner's Sons Company, Philadelphia, Pennsylvania.
