= USS Buffalo (1893) =

Tender of the United States Navy

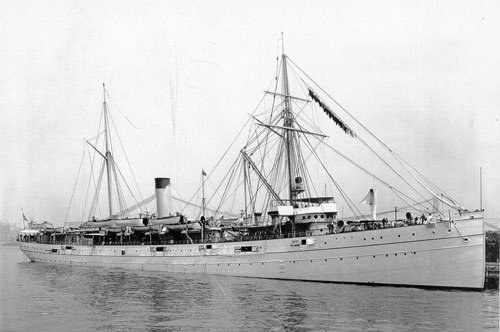
- USS Buffalo

History

United States
- Name: El Cid (1892–1893); Nictheroy (1893–1898); USS Buffalo (1898–)
- Laid down: Newport News Shipbuilding, Newport News, Virginia
- Launched: 31 May 1893
- Commissioned: 22 September 1898
- Decommissioned: 15 November 1922
- Reclassified: AD-8 (Destroyer tender), 1918
- Stricken: 27 May 1927
- Fate: Sold, September 1927

General characteristics
- Type: auxiliary cruiser / Destroyer tender
- Displacement: 6,530 long tons (6,635 t)
- Length: 406 ft 1 in (123.77 m)
- Beam: 48 ft 3 in (14.71 m)
- Draft: 20 ft 8 in (6.30 m)
- Speed: 14.5 knots (26.9 km/h; 16.7 mph)
- Complement: 350 officers and enlisted
- Armament: 2 × 5 in (130 mm) guns; 4 × 4 in (100 mm) guns; 6 × 6-pounder guns

The second USS Buffalo (later AD-8) was an auxiliary cruiser of the United States Navy, and later a destroyer tender.

Buffalo was launched on 31 May 1893 by Newport News Shipbuilding and Dry Dock Company, in Newport News, Virginia, as El Cid for the Southern Pacific Railroad's Morgan Line. She was completed in August 1893 and sold to Brazil and renamed Nictheroy. Purchased by the Navy from the Brazilian Government on 11 July 1898, she was renamed Buffalo, commissioned in ordinary a week later, fitted out as an auxiliary cruiser at New York Navy Yard; and placed in full commission on 22 September 1898, with Lieutenant Commander Joseph Newton Hemphill in command.

== Service history ==
=== 1898–1915 ===
Her first cruise, from 7 December 1898 to 7 May 1899, was from New York City to Manila and return, sailing east. Upon her return she was placed out of commission on 3 July 1899. On 2 April 1900, she was recommissioned and served as a training vessel. As a training vessel, Buffalo traveled widely. She made four voyages to the Philippines with replacement crews for the Asiatic Fleet (24 April – 20 October 1900, 24 December 1900 – 13 May 1901, 5 June – 13 October 1902, and 17 December 1903 – 14 July 1904). All except the last, which terminated at Mare Island, began and ended at east coast ports. On her last voyage, Buffalo conveyed the 1st Torpedo Flotilla to Manila. Between 12 September and 23 November 1904 she cruised in the Pacific, returning to Mare Island.

Out of commission at Mare Island from April 1905 to 17 November 1906, she then served as a transport until 1915 in the Pacific. During 17–20 December 1909, she carried Marines to Nicaragua and remained there in support until 16 March 1910. In 1911–12, she served briefly with the Asiatic Fleet in Chinese waters; and then from 14 November through 4 December 1914 operated off Mexico. She spent 27 January through 29 November 1915 out of commission at Mare Island, and then rejoined the Pacific Fleet.

=== 1916–1927 ===
In 1916, she again served in Mexican waters, and between May and August 1917, Buffalo transported the Special Diplomatic Mission of the United States to Russia. Upon her return she was ordered into Philadelphia Navy Yard for conversion to a destroyer tender and reclassified AD-8. Conversion was completed in June 1918, and after loading torpedo equipment at Newport, Rhode Island, she departed for Brest, France, via Bermuda. She then proceeded to Gibraltar, where she operated as station and repair ship to destroyers and subchasers. From February until September 1919 she had similar duty with the Azores Detachment at Ponta Delgada and then returned to New York.

On 31 December 1919, Buffalo arrived at San Diego, California to commence her duties as repair ship and tender to Destroyer Squadrons 5 and 11, Pacific Fleet. In November 1921, she was ordered to the Asiatic Station as tender to Destroyer Squadron, Asiatic Fleet, and arrived at Manila in December. During the summer of 1922 she cruised with the fleet in Chinese waters and in September arrived at Yokohama, Japan. She returned to the west coast on 8 October and was decommissioned on 15 November 1922 at San Diego. She was used as a barracks ship until stricken from the Navy List on 27 May 1927. She was sold four months later.
