= Montgomery-class cruiser =

Class of American naval ships

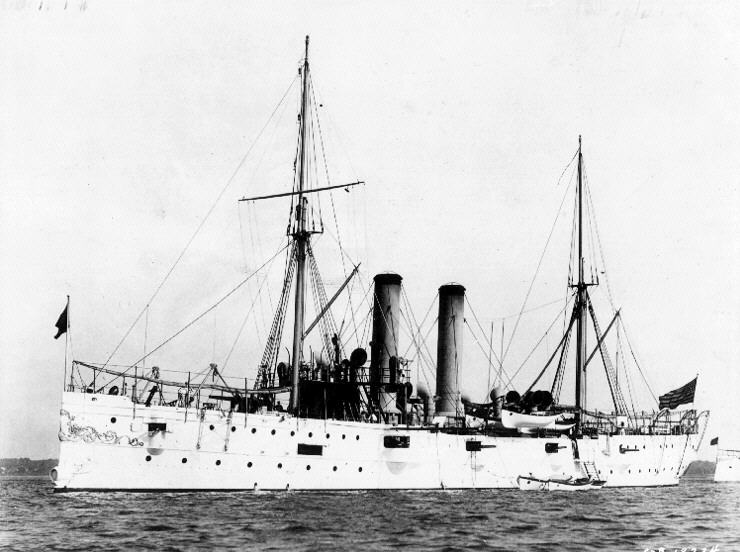
- USS Montgomery (C-9)

Class overview
- Name: Montgomery class
- Builders: Columbian Iron Works and Dry Dock, Baltimore; City Point Iron Works, Boston
- Operators: United States Navy
- Preceded by: Cincinnati class
- Succeeded by: Columbia class
- Cost: $612,500–$675,000 each
- Built: 1890–1894
- In commission: 1893–1919
- Planned: 3
- Completed: 3
- Scrapped: 3

General characteristics
- Type: Unprotected cruiser
- Displacement: 2,000 tons
- Length: 257 ft (78 m)
- Beam: 37 ft (11 m)
- Draft: 14 ft 6 in (4.42 m)
- Installed power: 6 × steam boilers; 2 × vertical triple expansion engines; 5,400 ihp (4,000 kW)
- Propulsion: 2 × screws
- Speed: 18 knots (33 km/h)
- Range: 3,280 nmi (6,070 km; 3,770 mi) at 10 kn (19 km/h; 12 mph)
- Complement: 20 officers, 228 enlisted men
- Armament: As built: 2 × 6 in (152 mm)/35 caliber Mark 3 rapid fire (RF) guns (one ship, either Detroit or Montgomery); 8 × 5 in (127 mm)/40 caliber Mark 2 RF guns; 6 × 6-pounder (57 mm (2.2 in)) RF guns; 2 × 1-pounder (37 mm (1.5 in)) RF guns; 1 × Gatling gun; 3 × 18 inch (450 mm) torpedo tubes
- Armor: Protective deck: 5/16 in (8 mm) on the flat; 7/16 in (11 mm) on the slope; Conning tower: 2 in (51 mm); "Woodite" (cellulose) packed cofferdam: 3 ft 11 in (119 cm) height; no inner bottom

The Montgomery-class cruisers were three unprotected cruisers built for the United States Navy in the early 1890s. They had a thin water-tight protective deck, and also relied for protection upon their coal bunkers, cellulose packing, and numerous compartments. Roomy accommodations were provided for officers and crew, these cruisers being mainly intended for long cruises on distant stations.

Known initially as cruisers Nos. 9, 10, and 11, the Montgomery-class cruisers were authorized by an Act of Congress approved September 7, 1888.

== Design and construction ==
As the U.S. Navy began to rebuild its fleet with steel-hulled vessels to keep pace with the advance of naval technology in the 1880s, it explored a wide range of conceptual designs. One of these was the "peace cruiser," a barely-armored vessel that amounted to a large gunboat, and in the 1888 naval appropriations bill, Congress set aside money to build three such vessels.

=== Acquisition ===
In May 1889, the Department of the Navy invited proposals for the construction of three cruisers of about 2,000 tons displacement each, at a cost of not more than $700,000 each. When the bids were opened on August 22 of that year, Bath Iron Works and William Cramp & Sons submitted bids that were over the limit fixed by Congress in the act of September 1888, and it was decided to re-advertise for proposals. The revised terms reduced the required speed from 18 knots to 17 knots and set a premium for increased speed at $23,000 for each quarter-knot in excess of the required speed of 17 knots; a penalty of $25,000 was set for every quarter-knot short of the required speed and in case of failure to develop and maintain a speed of 16 knots for four hours straight, the vessels could be rejected. The time fixed for completion was also extended from two years to two years and six mouths.

Bath resubmitted a bid, Cramp and Sons dropped out, and other bids were received from the Union Iron Works of San Francisco, N.F. Palmer Jr. & Company of New York (representative of Delaware River Shipbuilding and of Quintard Iron Works, who made Marblehead's machinery), Columbian Iron Works of Baltimore and Harrison Loring, owner of City Point Iron Works of Boston.

On October 28, 1889, the department awarded contracts to the Columbian Iron Works and Dry Dock Company for the construction of two of these cruisers (Montgomery and Detroit) for the sum of $612,500 each, and on November 1 it awarded City Point Iron Works the contract for the construction of the other cruiser (Marblehead) for the sum of $674,000. The ships built by Columbian were laid down in February 1890 and Marblehead was laid down in October 1890; Detroit was launched first, in October 1891; Montgomery was launched in December of that year and Marblehead the next August.

=== Armament ===
These ships were designed with a main gun armament of two 6 in (152 mm)/35 caliber Mark 3 rapid fire (RF) guns (one each fore and aft) and eight 4 in (102 mm)/40 caliber RF guns along the sides. However, 5 in (127 mm)/40 caliber Mark 2 RF guns were substituted for the 4-inch guns prior to construction. The class had poor stability as built due to the armored deck, and only one ship (either Detroit or Montgomery) was actually completed with the 6-inch guns. References vary as to how the lack of 6-inch guns was compensated for. The Register of Ships of the US Navy states that Detroit was completed in 1893 with 6-inch guns, which were removed by 1894, and the other ships were completed with only eight 5-inch guns. In 1895-96 Montgomery and Marblehead had a 5-inch gun added on the forward deck, and by 1897 all three ships had 10 5-inch guns, probably due to an additional gun on the aft deck.

Secondary armament was six 6-pounder (57 mm (2.2 in)) RF guns, two 1-pounder (37 mm (1.5 in)) RF guns, along with one Gatling gun and three 18 inch (450 mm) torpedo tubes. Along with Olympia and the Cincinnati class, these were among the first US Navy ships to carry 5-inch guns.

=== Protection ===
The protective deck, arranged similarly to that of a protected cruiser, was 7/16 in (11 mm) on the sloped sides and 5/16 in (7.9 mm) in the flat middle; even this meager protection proved detrimental to stability. The conning tower was 2 in (51 mm) thick. Coal bunkers and a cofferdam of "Woodite" (cellulose) were also part of the protection; this was called "coal-protected". The "peace cruiser" concept implied that these ships were primarily for peacetime "show the flag" missions and not for combat against other cruisers, although they did engage in shore bombardment in the Spanish–American War. Most of these cruisers were redesignated as gunboats (hull classification symbol PG) in 1920.

=== Engineering ===
The as-built engineering plant included six coal-fired cylindrical boilers, which produced steam for two vertical triple expansion engines totaling 5,400 ihp (4,000 kW) for a contract speed of 17 knots (31 km/h; 20 mph). Speeds on trials ranged from 18.44 knots (34.15 km/h; 21.22 mph) to 19.05 knots (35.28 km/h; 21.92 mph); the builders received their contract bonuses. The ships normally carried 200 tons of coal for a designed range of 3,280 nmi (6,070 km; 3,770 mi) at 10 kn (19 km/h; 12 mph); this could be increased to 340 tons for a range of 8,952 nmi (16,579 km; 10,302 mi) at 10 kn (19 km/h; 12 mph).

=== Refits ===
Montgomery was converted to a torpedo test ship in 1904–1908 and carried various types of torpedo tubes until 1914, when she was further refitted as a training ship for the Maryland Naval Militia with four 4-inch (102 mm)/40 caliber guns and four torpedo tubes, two each 18 inch (450 mm) and 21-inch. She was reboilered with six Almy boilers in 1918, when she was reactivated for coastal patrol duty as USS Anniston. The torpedo tubes were removed from Detroit and Marblehead in 1901–02. Marblehead was refitted as a training ship for the Oregon Naval Militia in 1915 with eight 4-inch/40 caliber guns.

== Service ==
Detroit was commissioned in July 1893, Marblehead in April 1894 and Montgomery in June 1894. In the years leading up to the Spanish–American War they spent the bulk of their service in Atlantic, Caribbean and European waters; Detroit protected American citizens and interests during unrest in Brazil, and later served two years on the Asiatic Station.

During the Spanish–American War, Montgomery blockaded and bombarded Cuba, capturing two Spanish merchant vessels. Detroit bombarded San Juan, Puerto Rico. Marblehead bombarded Cuba and participated in the capture of Guantánamo Bay.

After the war all three ships operated in Latin American waters, Marblehead on the Pacific side, showing the flag in peaceful ports and protecting American citizens and interests in the event of unrest. All were decommissioned in 1900 and recommissioned in 1902. Detroit operated in the Caribbean, intervening diplomatically to resolve an insurgency in the Dominican Republic in 1904. Montgomery operated in the Caribbean until she was converted to a torpedo test ship 1904–1908. Marblehead operated in the Pacific until decommissioned in 1906.

Detroit was decommissioned in August 1905 and sold for scrap in December 1910, but the other two continued in service through the First World War as Naval Militia training ships and on coastal patrols during the war. Montgomery was converted to a training ship in 1914; on 14 March 1918 she was renamed USS Anniston to free her name for USS Montgomery (DD-121), then struck in August 1919 and sold in November of that year; Marblehead was decommissioned in August 1919, reclassified as a gunboat (PG-27) in July 1920 and sold in August 1921.

== Ships in class ==
The three ships of the Montgomery class were:

| Ship | Shipyard | Laid down | Launched | Commissioned | Decommissioned | Fate |
|---|---|---|---|---|---|---|
| USS Montgomery (C-9) | Columbian Iron Works and Dry Dock, Baltimore, Maryland | February 1890 | 5 December 1891 | 21 June 1894 | 16 May 1918 | Renamed Anniston 14 March 1918, sold for scrap 14 November 1919 |
| USS Detroit (C-10) | Columbian Iron Works and Dry Dock | February 1890 | 28 October 1891 | 20 July 1893 | 1 August 1905 | Sold for scrap 22 December 1910 |
| USS Marblehead (C-11) | City Point Iron Works, Boston, Massachusetts | October 1890 | 11 August 1892 | 2 April 1894 | 21 August 1919 | Sold for scrap 5 August 1921 |

== See also ==
- List of cruisers of the United States Navy

== Bibliography ==
- Bauer, K. Jack; Roberts, Stephen S. (1991). Register of Ships of the U.S. Navy, 1775–1990: Major Combatants. Westport, Connecticut: Greenwood Press. ISBN 0-313-26202-0.
- Burr, Lawrence (2011). US Cruisers 1883-1904: The Birth of the Steel Navy. Osprey Publishing. ISBN 9781780962702.
- Friedman, Norman (1984). U.S. Cruisers: An Illustrated Design History. Annapolis, Maryland: Naval Institute Press. ISBN 0-87021-718-6.
- Gardiner, Robert; Chesneau, Roger (1979). Conway's All the World's Fighting Ships 1860–1905. New York: Mayflower Books. ISBN 0-8317-0302-4.
