= Samuel Triplett =

Samuel S. Triplett
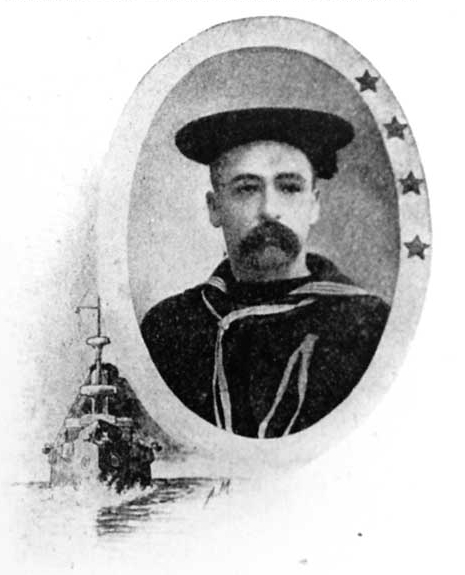
- Samuel Triplett
- Born: December 18, 1869; Cherokee, Kansas, US
- Died: August 26, 1957 (aged 87)
- Burial place: North Edna Cemetery, Edna, Kansas, US
- Military career
- Allegiance: United States
- Branch: United States Navy
- Rank: Chief Boatswain's Mate
- Unit: USS Marblehead
- Conflicts: Spanish–American War
- Awards: Medal of Honor

Samuel S. Triplett (December 18, 1869 – August 26, 1957) was a United States Navy sailor and a recipient of the United States military's highest decoration—the Medal of Honor—for his actions in the Spanish–American War.

== Biography ==
Triplett entered the Navy from the state of New York and, during the Spanish–American War, served as an Ordinary Seaman on the USS Marblehead. On July 26, and July 27, 1898, he took part in a demining operation in Guantanamo Bay, Cuba. He was awarded the Medal of Honor five months later, on December 14, 1898, for his actions during the operation.

Triplett reached the rank of Chief Boatswain's Mate before leaving the Navy. He was a member of the American Legion and the Veterans of Foreign Wars.

He died at age 87 and is buried in North Edna Cemetery, Edna, Kansas.

== Awards ==
- Medal of Honor
- Good Conduct Medal
- Sampson Medal
- Spanish Campaign Medal
- World War I Victory Medal

=== Medal of Honor citation ===
Rank and organization: Ordinary Seaman, U.S. Navy. Born: December 18, 1869, Chenokeeke, Kans. Accredited to: New York. G.O. No.: 500, December 14, 1898.

Citation:

On board the U.S.S. Marblehead at the approaches to Caimanera, Guantanamo Bay, Cuba, 26 and 27 July 1898. Displaying heroism, Triplett took part in the perilous work of sweeping for and disabling 27 contact mines during this period.

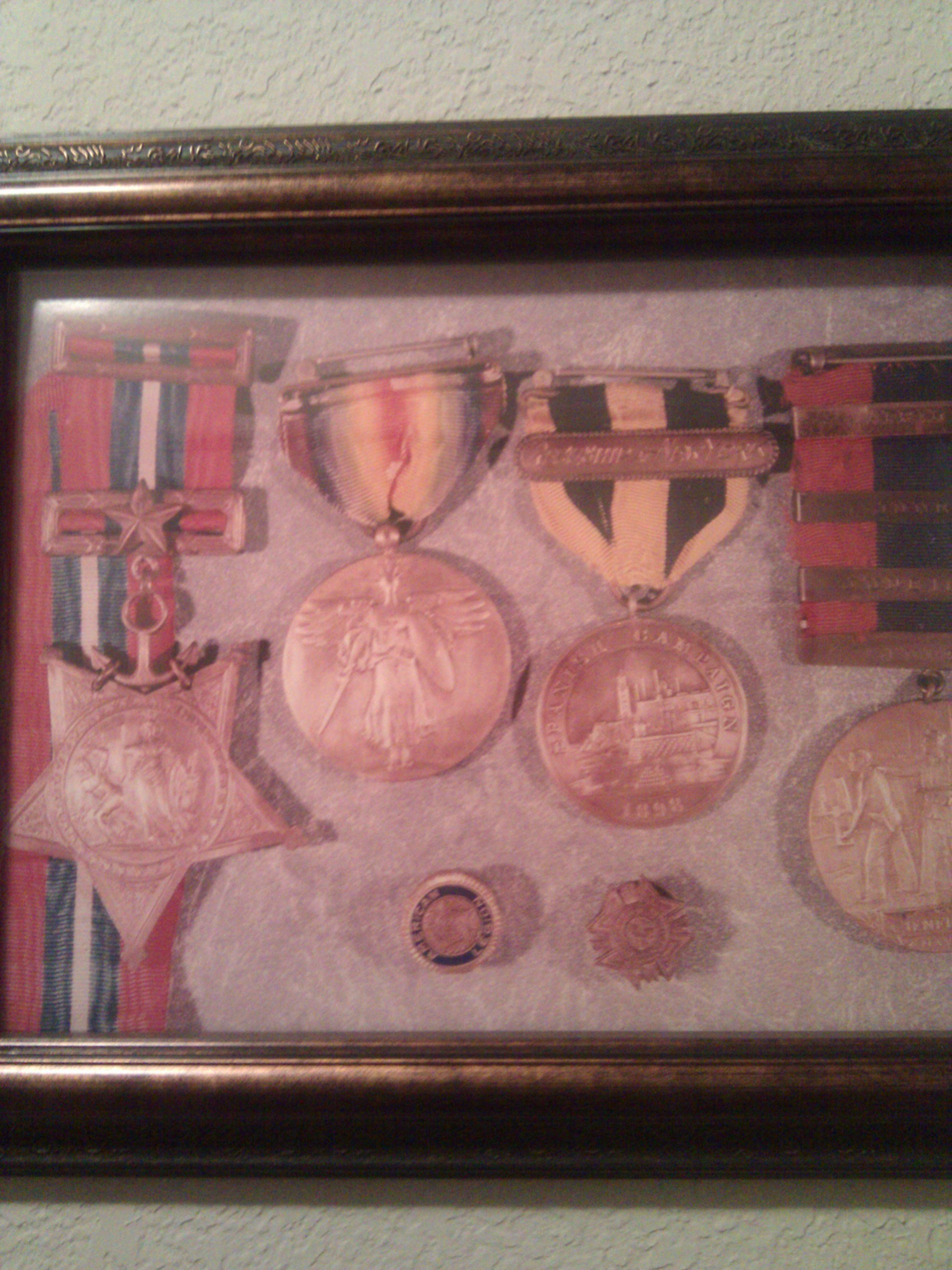
Medals

== See also ==
- List of Medal of Honor recipients
- List of Medal of Honor recipients for the Spanish–American War
