= USS Cincinnati (C-7) =

Cincinnati-class cruiser

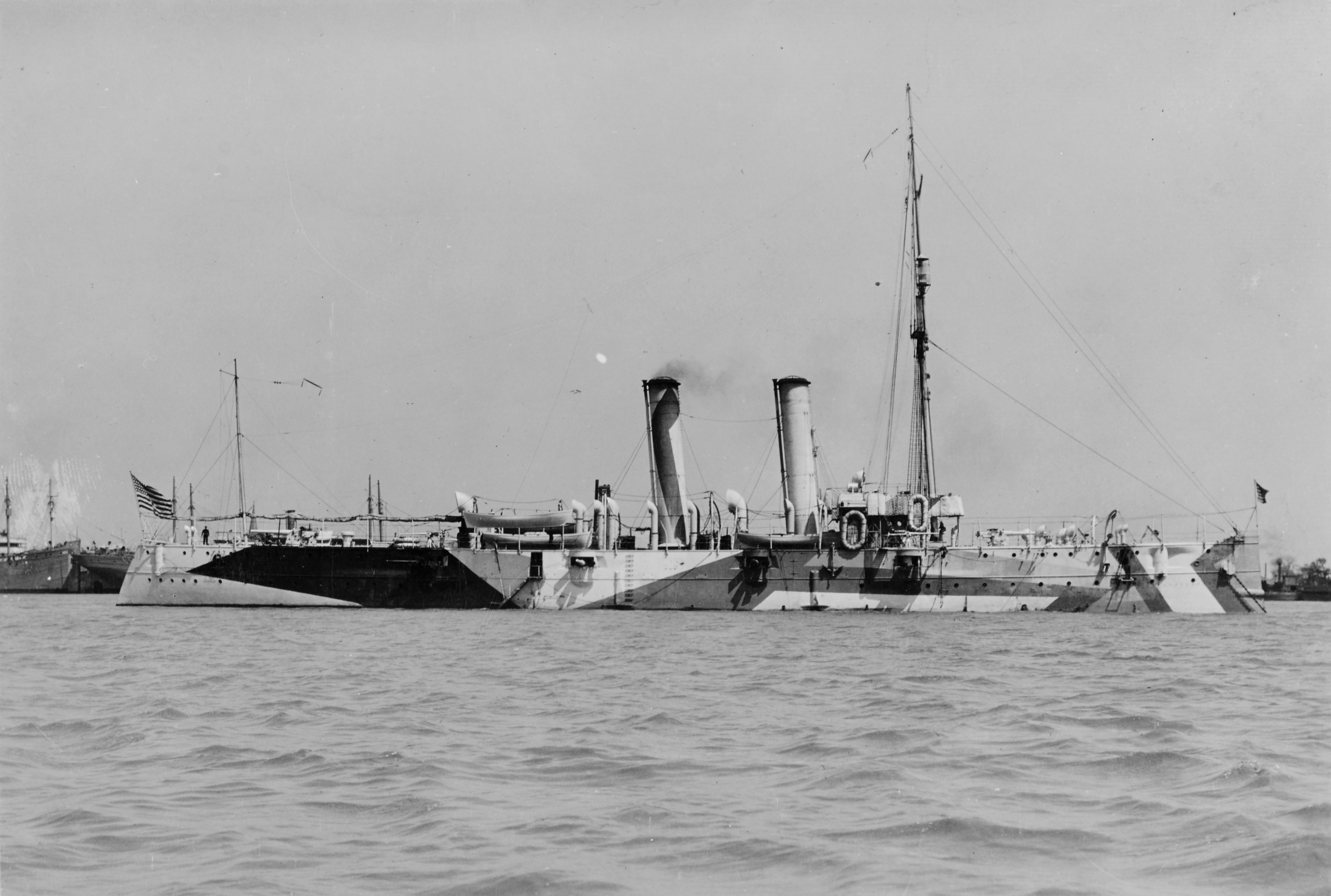
- USS Cincinnati (C-7)

History

United States
- Name: Cincinnati
- Namesake: City of Cincinnati, Ohio
- Ordered: 7 September 1888
- Builder: New York Navy Yard, Brooklyn, New York
- Cost: $1,100,000
- Laid down: 29 January 1890
- Launched: 10 November 1892
- Sponsored by: Miss S. Mosby
- Commissioned: 16 June 1894
- Decommissioned: 20 April 1919
- Stricken: 5 August 1921
- Identification: Hull symbol: C-7
- Fate: Sold for scrap 4 August 1921

General characteristics (as built)
- Class & type: Cincinnati-class protected cruiser
- Displacement: 3,183 long tons (3,234 t) (standard); 3,339 long tons (3,393 t) (full load)
- Length: 305 ft 9 in (93.19 m)
- Beam: 42 ft (13 m)
- Draft: 18 ft (5.5 m)
- Installed power: 6 × steam boilers; 10,000 ihp (7,500 kW)
- Propulsion: 2 × vertical triple expansion reciprocating engines; 2 × screws
- Sail plan: Schooner
- Speed: 19 knots (35 km/h; 22 mph); 19.91 kn (22.91 mph; 36.87 km/h) (Speed on Trial)
- Complement: 32 officers 270 enlisted
- Armament: 1 × 6 in (152 mm)/40 caliber guns; 10 × 5 in (127 mm)/40 caliber guns; 8 × 6-pounder (57 mm (2.2 in)) guns; 2 × 1-pounder (37 mm (1.5 in)) guns; 4 × 18-inch (450 mm) torpedo tubes
- Armor: Deck: 1 in (25 mm) to 2.5 in (64 mm); Conning Tower: 2 in (51 mm); Gun Sponsons: 4 in (100 mm)

General characteristics (1914)
- Installed power: 8 × Babcock & Wilcox boilers; 8,000 ihp (6,000 kW)
- Speed: 18 knots (33 km/h; 21 mph)
- Armament: 11 × 5 in (130 mm)/40 caliber guns; 6 × 6-pounder (57 mm (2.2 in)) guns

USS Cincinnati (C-7) was a protected cruiser and the lead ship of the Cincinnati-class cruiser for the United States Navy. She was launched on 10 November 1892 by New York Navy Yard; sponsored by Miss S. Mosby; and commissioned on 16 June 1894. She was the second ship to be named after Cincinnati, Ohio.

== Service history ==
=== Spanish–American War ===
Cincinnati's first cruise, along the east coast, and then in the Caribbean, found her enforcing neutrality laws at Tampa and Key West during the Cuban Revolution from September 1895 to January 1896. From September 1896 to July 1897, she served in the eastern Mediterranean, returning to the South Atlantic Station in September 1897. In April 1898, the opening month of the Spanish–American War, Cincinnati, commanded by Captain Colby Mitchell Chester, joined the blockade off Havana, Cuba, and bombarded Matanzas. The next month, she scouted throughout the West Indies searching for the Spanish fleet known to be approaching Cuba.

At the close of May, Cincinnati came north for repairs, returning to the Caribbean for occupation duty in August. She convoyed troops from Guantanamo Bay to Puerto Rico, patrolled off San Juan, made a reconnaissance of Culebra Island, and escorted the captured Spanish flagship Infanta Maria Teresa until the prize of war sank en route to Norfolk from Cuba. On 8–9 August, Cincinnati provided illumination with her searchlights and naval gunfire to support bluejackets defending the Cape San Juan Light from a Spanish ground assault in the Battle of Fajardo. After joining in salvage operations at Santiago in November, she sailed north, and from 14 February 1899 to 2 December 1901 was out of commission at New York Navy Yard for extensive repairs.

=== Pre-World War I ===
From May 1902 to January 1903, Cincinnati protected American citizens and property in the Caribbean during political disturbances at Haiti, Santo Domingo, and Panama, and brought relief supplies to Martinique after the devastating eruption of Mount Pelee. From January to May 1903, the cruiser sailed in the Mediterranean, then passed through the Suez Canal for four years of duty on the Asiatic Station, based in the Philippines. Target practice, maneuvers, and goodwill cruises took her to many ports in China, Japan, and the Pacific islands, and from time to time she patrolled off Korea. She returned to Mare Island Navy Yard on 10 September 1907, and was decommissioned there on 12 October.

=== World War I and beyond ===
Recommissioned in reserve on 8 March 1911, Cincinnati was in full commission on 11 October 1911, and two months later returned to the Asiatic Station for a six-year tour of duty similar to her earlier employment there. She returned to San Diego on 16 December 1917, and while bound for the east coast took part in humanitarian relief at San Jose, Guatemala, after severe earthquakes. She arrived in Hampton Roads on 16 January 1918.

As flagship of the American Patrol Detachment, Atlantic Fleet, from 1 February 1918 to 28 March 1919, Cincinnati patrolled the Gulf of Mexico from Key West, protecting the movement of vital oil supplies. She was decommissioned at New Orleans on 20 April, and sold on 4 August 1921.
