= Cincinnati-class cruiser =

Class of American naval ships

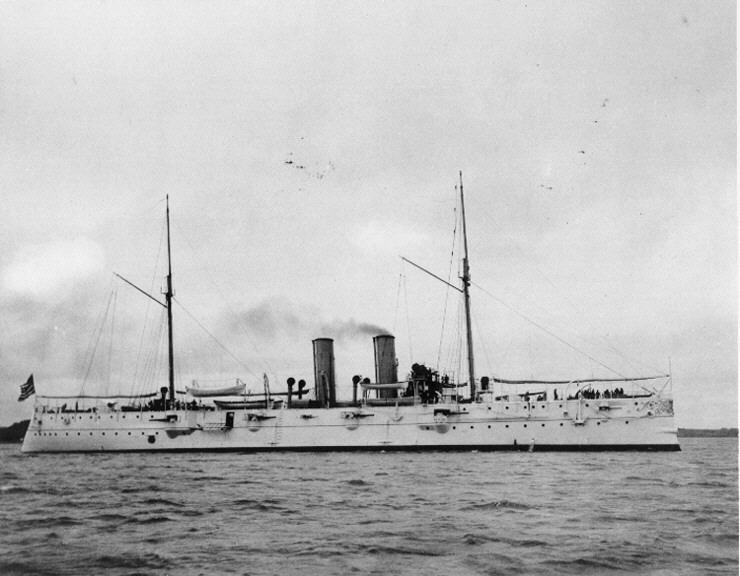
- USS Cincinnati

Class overview
- Name: Cincinnati class
- Builders: New York Navy Yard, NY (1); Norfolk Navy Yard, VA (1)
- Operators: United States Navy
- Preceded by: USS Olympia (C-6)
- Succeeded by: Montgomery class
- Cost: $1,100,000 each
- Built: 1889–1894
- In service: 1894–1920
- In commission: 1894–1919
- Planned: 2
- Completed: 2
- Scrapped: 2

General characteristics
- Type: Protected cruiser
- Displacement: 3,183 long tons (3,234 t) (standard); 3,339 long tons (3,393 t) (full load)
- Length: 305 ft 9 in (93.19 m)
- Beam: 42 ft (13 m)
- Draft: 18 ft (5.5 m)
- Installed power: 6 × steam boilers; 2 × vertical triple expansion engines; 10,000 ihp (7,500 kW)
- Propulsion: 2 × screws
- Speed: 19 knots (35 km/h)
- Range: 8,652 nmi (16,024 km; 9,957 mi) at 10 kn (19 km/h; 12 mph)
- Complement: 312
- Armament: As built: 1 × 6 in (152 mm)/40 caliber gun; 10 × 5 in (127 mm)/40 caliber guns; 8 × 6-pounder (57 mm (2.2 in)) guns; 2 × 1-pounder (37 mm (1.5 in)) guns; 1 × Gatling gun; 4 × 18 inch (450 mm) torpedo tubes
- Armor: Deck: 2.5 in (64 mm) (slope); 1 in (25 mm) (flat); Conning Tower: 2 in (51 mm); Gun Sponsons: 4 in (102 mm)

General characteristics (1903)
- Installed power: 8 × Babcock & Wilcox boilers; 2 × vertical triple expansion engines; 8,500 ihp (6,300 kW)
- Propulsion: 2 × screws
- Speed: 18 knots (33 km/h)
- Armament: 11 × 5 in (127 mm)/40 caliber guns; 8 × 6-pounder (57 mm (2.2 in)) guns; 2 × 1-pounder (37 mm (1.5 in)) guns; 1 × Gatling gun

The Cincinnati-class cruisers were two small protected cruisers built for the United States Navy in the early 1890s. They were smaller and more lightly armed and protected than most previous US cruisers, and were intended for commerce raiding. They may also be referred to as Raleigh-class cruisers, as Raleigh was launched and commissioned prior to Cincinnati.

The Cincinnati-class cruisers were authorized by an Act of Congress approved on 7 September 1888, in the same bill with New York, Olympia and the Montgomery class.

== Design and construction ==
As the U.S. Navy began to rebuild its fleet with steel-hulled vessels to keep pace with the advance of naval technology in the 1880s, it explored a wide range of design concepts. Among the approaches to the protected cruiser design was that of a small and fast commerce raider. Thus, in the 1888 naval appropriations bill, Congress set aside money to build five such vessels, two Cincinnati class of 3,000 tons and three Montgomery class of 2,000 tons.

In May 1889, the Department of the Navy invited proposals for the construction of two cruisers of about 3,000 tons displacement each, at a cost of not more than $1,100,000 each. William Cramp & Sons was the only shipbuilder to respond, but with a bid in excess of the limit; the Department of the Navy exercised an option in the appropriation bill to construct the cruisers in its own yards; Cincinnati was built at the Brooklyn Navy Yard, while Raleigh was built at the Norfolk Navy Yard.

=== Armament ===
The as-built main armament of the ships was one 6 in (152 mm)/40 caliber gun on the forward deck and ten 5 in (127 mm)/40 caliber guns (two side-by-side on the aft deck, the remainder in sponsons along the sides). Secondary armament was eight 6-pounder (57 mm (2.2 in)) rapid fire guns, two 1-pounder (37 mm (1.5 in)) rapid fire guns, along with one Gatling gun and four 18 inch (450 mm) torpedo tubes. Along with Olympia and the Montgomery class, these were among the first US Navy ships to carry 5-inch guns.

=== Armor ===
The protective deck was 2 in (51 mm) to 2.5 in (64 mm) on the sloped sides and 1 in (25 mm) in the flat middle. 4 in (102 mm) of armor was provided for the gun sponsons on the sides, and the conning tower was 2 in (51 mm) thick.

=== Engineering ===
The as-built engineering plant included six coal-fired cylindrical boilers, which produced steam for two vertical triple expansion engines totaling 10,000 ihp (7,500 kW) (designed) for a designed speed of 19 knots (35 km/h; 22 mph). Cincinnati reached 19.91 knots (36.87 km/h; 22.91 mph) at 7,070 ihp (5,270 kW) on trials; Raleigh reached 21.12 knots (39.11 km/h; 24.30 mph) but the horsepower is unknown. Some references state the class carried fore-and-aft sails as built, other references state they were never carried. The ships normally carried 556 tons of coal for a designed range of 8,652 nmi (16,024 km; 9,957 mi) at 10 kn (19 km/h; 12 mph); this could be increased to 700 tons. The as-built propulsion plant proved to have a high coal consumption and could not maintain 19 knots (35 km/h; 22 mph) for long; the boilers and engines were replaced in refits circa 1901.

=== Refits ===
Cincinnati was refitted in 1899-1901; Raleigh followed in 1899-1903. The lone 6-inch gun was replaced by an additional 5-inch/40 caliber gun and the torpedo tubes were removed. Eight Babcock & Wilcox boilers were installed, along with lower powered but more fuel-efficient triple-expansion engines totaling 8,500 ihp (6,300 kW) for a speed of 18 knots (33 km/h; 21 mph). Two 5-inch guns, for a total of nine remaining, were removed by 1918.

== Service ==
Both ships were engaged in the Spanish–American War, Cincinnati off Cuba and Raleigh in the Philippines. Raleigh is credited with firing the first shot of the Battle of Manila Bay from a 5-inch/40 caliber gun in 1898. Raleigh also engaged in the early part of the Philippine–American War, while Cincinnati protected American citizens and interests during political unrest in the Caribbean. Both served in East Asia 1903–1907, after which both were decommissioned until 1911. Cincinnati then spent six years in East Asia, followed by patrol duty in the Gulf of Mexico during World War I. Raleigh operated in Mexico and Central America 1913–1916, followed by a yard period. After the US entered World War I in 1917, Raleigh operated from Brazil, and in mid-1918 joined Cincinnati in the Gulf of Mexico. In mid-1919 both ships were decommissioned, and both were scrapped in 1921.

== Ships in class ==
The two ships of the Cincinnati class were:

Ship	Shipyard	Laid down	Launched	Commissioned	Decommissioned	Fate
USS Cincinnati (C-7)	New York Navy Yard, Brooklyn, New York	29 January 1890	10 November 1892	16 June 1894	20 April 1919	Sold for scrap 5 August 1921
USS Raleigh (C-8)	Norfolk Navy Yard, Portsmouth, Virginia	19 December 1889	31 March 1892	17 April 1894	21 April 1919	Sold for scrap 5 August 1921

Note: It appears that the hull numbers PG-25 and PG-26 (patrol gunboat) were reserved for these ships as part of a fleet-wide redesignation in 1920, but the ships were ordered sold before the redesignation took effect on 17 July 1920.

== See also ==
- List of cruisers of the United States Navy

== Bibliography ==
- Bauer, K. Jack; Roberts, Stephen S. (1991). Register of Ships of the U.S. Navy, 1775–1990: Major Combatants. Westport, Connecticut: Greenwood Press. ISBN 0-313-26202-0.
- Burr, Lawrence (2011). US Cruisers 1883-1904: The Birth of the Steel Navy. Osprey Publishing. ISBN 9781780962702.
- Friedman, Norman (1984). U.S. Cruisers: An Illustrated Design History. Annapolis, Maryland: Naval Institute Press. ISBN 0-87021-718-6.
- Gardiner, Robert; Chesneau, Roger (1979). Conway's All the World's Fighting Ships 1860–1905. New York: Mayflower Books. ISBN 0-8317-0302-4.
