= Axel Sundquist =

Axel L. Sundquist
- Born: May 26, 1867; Grand Duchy of Finland, Russia
- Died: December 22, 1910 (aged 43)
- Burial place: Braman Cemetery Newport, Rhode Island, U.S.
- Military career
- Allegiance: United States
- Branch: United States Navy
- Rank: Chief Carpenter
- Unit: USS Marblehead
- Conflicts: Spanish–American War
- Awards: Medal of Honor

Axel Leohard Sundquist (May 26, 1867 as Axel Leonard S. - December 22, 1910 ) was a chief carpenter (warrant officer) serving in the United States Navy who received the Medal of Honor for bravery during the Spanish–American War.

== Biography ==
Sundquist was born on May 26, 1867, in Jakobstad in the Grand Duchy of Finland, then part of the Russian Empire. He later emigrated to the United States. He enlisted in the United States Navy on August 31, 1893.

During the Spanish–American War in 1898 he was a chief carpenter's mate aboard the cruiser U.S.S. Marblehead. He received the Medal of Honor for his efforts in clearing 27 contact mines from Guantánamo Bay in July 1898.

He was warranted as a carpenter on December 12, 1898, and received the Medal of Honor seven days later. In March 1903 he was assigned to the Naval Torpedo Station in Newport, Rhode Island. He was promoted to chief carpenter on December 12, 1904.

Sundquist died on December 22, 1910.

== Awards ==
- Medal of Honor
- Good Conduct Medal
- Sampson Medal
- Spanish Campaign Medal

=== Medal of Honor citation ===
Rank and organization: Chief Carpenter's Mate, U.S. Navy. Born: 26 May 1867, Furland, Russia. Accredited to: Pennsylvania. G.O. No.: 500, 19 December 1898.

Citation:

On board the U.S.S. Marblehead at the approaches to Caimanera, Guantanamo Bay, Cuba, 26 and 27 July 1898. Displaying heroism, Sundquist took part in the perilous work of sweeping for and disabling 27 contact mines during this period.

== See also ==
- List of Medal of Honor recipients for the Spanish–American War
