= Michel Lévy =

French publisher (1821-1875)

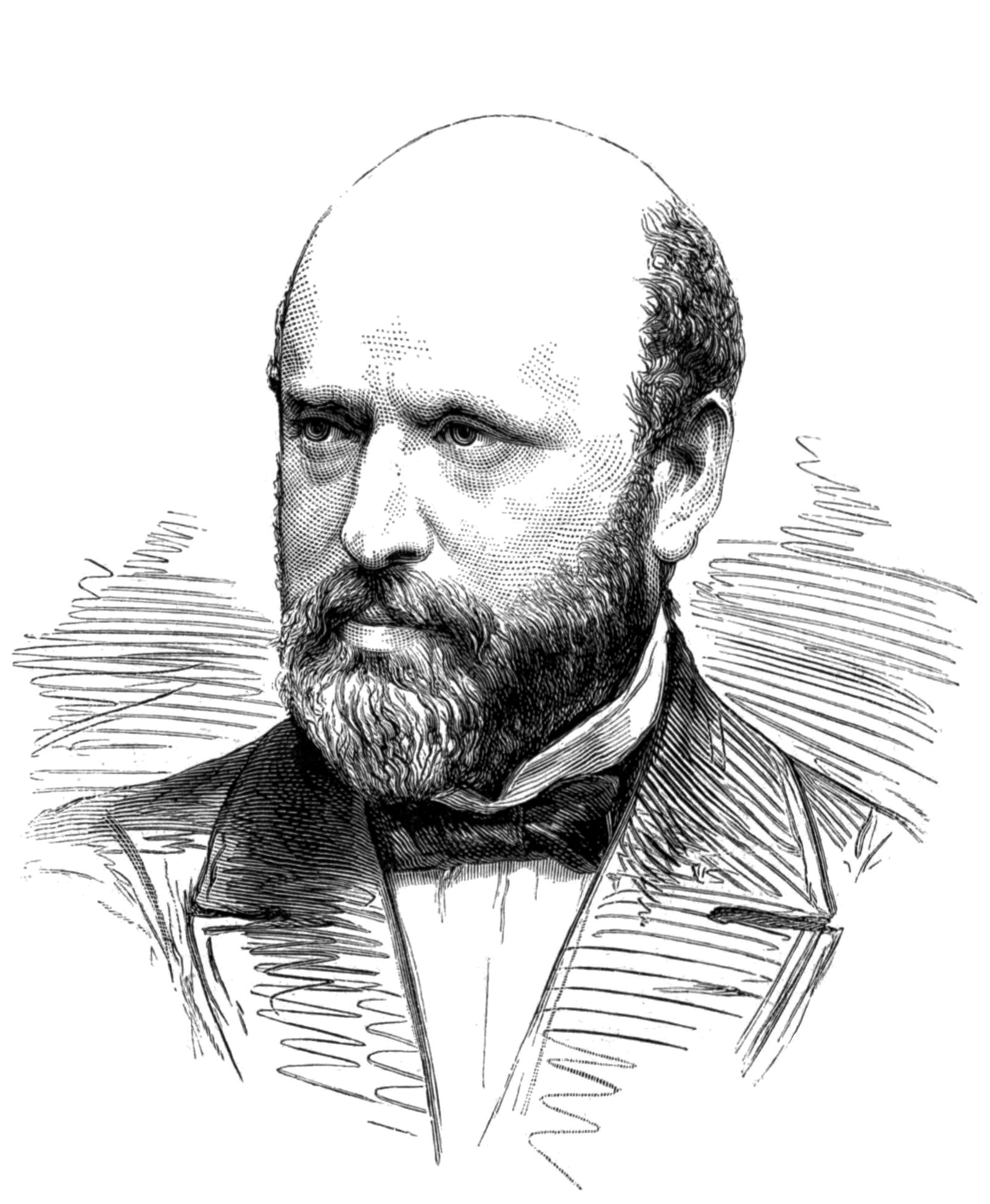
Michel Lévy

Michel Lévy (1821–1875) was the founder of the Michel Lévy Frères publishing house.

== Biography ==
Born in Phalsbourg, he was the son of a colporteur (a peddler of printed publications). In 1836, aged fifteen, he opened a reading cabinet and a "theatrical library" in Paris, rue Marie-Stuart, under the name Michel Lévy frères, but at first acting alone. In 1842 he moved the business to Passage du Grand-Cerf. In 1845, he did involve his brothers, Calmann and Nathan. Nathan would retire from the business in 1850. He edited various dramatic works, including collections such as la bibliothèque dramatique, le théâtre contemporain illustré, and most notably the successful collection Michel Lévy in 1856. Financial success allowed him to open a grand book-store at rue Auber.

The Lévy brothers published most of the important French authors of the second half of the 19th century, including Dumas, Balzac, Hugo, Sand, Flaubert, Baudelaire, Stendhal, and Nerval. The brothers also entered the flourishing periodical market, publishing magazines such as L'Entracte, L'Univers illustré, Le Journal du jeudi and Le Journal du dimanche. Lévy was decorated with the légion d'Honneur in 1873, and he died unexpectedly on 4 May 1875. George Sand wrote his obituary in the 15 May edition of L'Univers illustré. The business was continued by his brother Calmann, as Calmann-Lévy.
