= William H. Morin =

- Born: May 23, 1869; England
- Died: August 29, 1935 (aged 66)
- Military career
- Allegiance: United States
- Branch: United States Navy
- Rank: Boatswain's Mate Second Class
- Unit: U.S.S. Marblehead
- Conflicts: Spanish–American War
- Awards: Medal of Honor

William Henry Morin (May 23, 1869 – August 29, 1935) was a boatswain's mate second class serving in the United States Navy during the Spanish–American War who received the Medal of Honor for bravery.

== Biography ==
Morin was born May 23, 1869, in England and enlisted the United States Navy on November 17, 1892.

During the Spanish–American War he was a boatswain's mate second class aboard the cruiser U.S.S. Marblehead. In July 1898 he assisted in the clearing of 27 contact mines from Guantanamo Bay, Cuba, for which he, and two others, received the Medal of Honor in December of that year.

Morin was warranted to the rank of boatswain on July 30, 1903, and retired from the Navy on April 12, 1910.

In 1916, Morin became the first reported naval officer to be court-martialed. He was convicted of disobeying a lawful order of the Secretary of the Navy and three specifications of conduct unbecoming an officer and gentlemen predicated on his failure to pay certain debts. Despite holding the Medal of Honor, he was dismissed from the Navy on October 10, 1916.

He died at age 66 on August 29, 1935.

== Medal of Honor citation ==
Rank and organization: Boatswain's Mate Second Class, U.S. Navy. Born: 23 May 1869, England. G.O. No.: 500, 14 December 1898.

Citation:

On board the U.S.S. Marblehead at the approaches to Caimanera, Guantanamo Bay, Cuba, 26 and 27 July 1898. Displaying heroism, Morin took part in the perilous work of sweeping for and disabling 27 contact mines during this period.

== See also ==
- List of Medal of Honor recipients for the Spanish–American War
