= Calmann-Lévy =

French publishing house

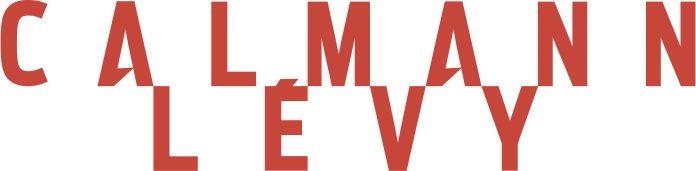
- Parent company: Hachette
- Predecessor: Michel Lévy frères
- Founded: 1836
- Founder: Michel Lévy and Kalmus "Calmann" Lévy
- Country of origin: France
- Headquarters location: Paris
- Publication types: Books
- Official website: calmann-levy.fr

Calmann-Lévy is a French publishing house founded in 1836 by Michel Lévy as Michel Lévy frères. His brother Kalmus Calmann Lévy joined in 1844. After Michel's death in 1875, the firm was renamed Calmann Lévy.

== History ==
In 1836, Michel Lévy (1821–1875) founded the publishing house of Michel Lévy frères. In 1844, his brother Kalmus "Calmann" Lévy (1819–1891) joined the publishing house. After Michel's death in 1875, Calmann became the sole proprietor and the firm was renamed Calmann Lévy. Shortly before his death, he admitted his three sons into a partnership.

By 1875, the company was among the foremost publishing houses of Europe. It was the publisher of most of the important French authors of the second half of the 19th century, including Balzac, Baudelaire, René Bazin, Gabriele D'Annunzio, Dumas, Flaubert, Victor Hugo, Lamartine, Ernest Renan, George Sand, and Stendhal. In 1891, it published the memoirs of Charles Maurice de Talleyrand-Périgord, and in 1893, the memoirs of Alexis de Tocqueville. In 1893, Calmann was succeeded by his sons Georges, Paul, and Gaston, who went on to publish authors including Anatole France, Pierre Loti and Proust.

During Nazi occupation, Gaston Lévy was interned, and the publishing company, run by the Germans, was renamed Éditions Balzac in 1943. After the liberation, the company was headed by Léon Pioton. Authors edited during the postwar period included: Arthur Koestler, Elia Kazan, Anne Frank, and later Donna Leon, Nicolas Hulot, Patricia Cornwell, Guillaume Musso, among others.

=== Present day ===
Since 1993, Calmann-Lévy has been owned by publisher Hachette (which is in turn owned by Lagardère Group).

== Book series ==
- Action, amour, aventure
- Les années du...
- Bibliothèque contemporaine
- Bibliothèque des voyageurs
- Bibliothèque dramatique
- Bibliothèque littéraire
- Bibliothèque théâtrale
- Bibliothèque des chefs-d'ieuvre du roman contemporain
- Calmann-Lévy collection
- Calmann-Lévy collection nouvelle
- Châteaux, décors de l'histoire
- Collection bleue
- Collection engagements
- Collection Hetzel et Lévy
- Collection le prisme
- Collection les romans de la rose
- Collection le zodiaque
- Collection masques et visages
- Collection Michel Lévy
- Collection Nelson: Chefs-d'oeuvre de la littérature
- Collection Presses Pocket
- Collection roman d'ailleurs
- Diaspora
- Dimensions SF
- Edition du centenaire
- E. Guillaume et Cie
- Essai société
- Collection France de toujours et d'aujourd'hui
- L'Heure H
- Interstices
- Liberté de l'esprit
- Le Livre de poche
- Médailles d'or
- Nouvelle collection historique
- Nouvelle collection illustrée
- Nouvelle collection Michel Lévy
- L'Ordre des choses
- Perspectives économiques
- Pour nos enfants
- Pourpre
- Questions d'actualité
- Le Romantisme des classiques
- Temps & continents
- Traduit de
