= L'Univers illustré =

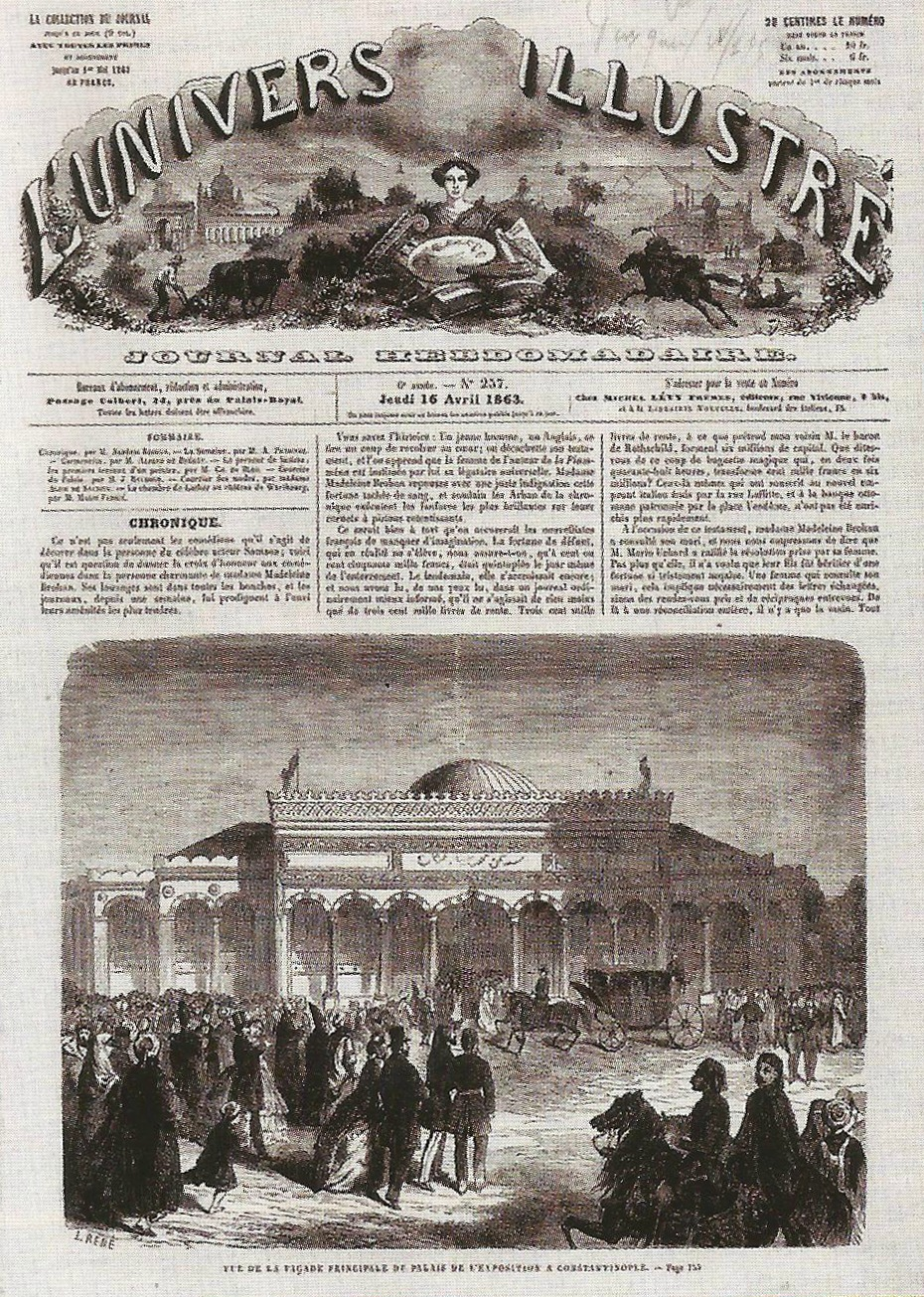
Front-page from 1863

L'Univers illustré was a French language weekly periodical published in Paris, France, between 1858 and 1900.

== History and profile ==
L'Univers illustré was established by Michel Lévy (1821–1875) and after Michel's death taken over by his brother Calmann, who went on to become the founder of the Calmann-Lévy publishing house. The magazine was merged with La Vie illustrée in 1900.
