= USS Yosemite (1894) =

History

United States
- Name: USS Yosemite
- Namesake: Yosemite Valley
- Builder: Wigham Richardson & Co., Newcastle-upon-Tyne, England
- Launched: 1894
- Acquired: 23 December 1910
- Commissioned: 11 November 1911 in reserve
- Decommissioned: 23 January 1912
- Stricken: 1 March 1912
- Fate: Sold for scrapping 10 June 1912
- Notes: Originally merchant ship SS Clearwater; Operated by U.S. War Department as USAT Ingalls 1899-1910

General characteristics
- Type: Steamer
- Displacement: 2,069 tons (normal)
- Length: 256 ft 0 in (78.03 m)
- Beam: 33 ft 0 in (10.06 m)
- Draft: 17 ft 3 in (5.26 m) (mean)
- Propulsion: Steam, screw
- Speed: 16 knots (30 km/h; 18 mph) (trials)
- Armament: 2 × 6-pounder guns

The second USS Yosemite was a steamer of the United States Navy that served briefly as a tender.

== Construction and early career ==
Yosemite was constructed as the merchant ship SS Clearwater in 1894. Sometime during the latter half of 1899, the United States Department of War acquired Clearwater for use as the United States Army Transport Ingalls.

== U.S. Navy career ==
On 23 December 1910, the Department of War transferred Ingalls to the U.S. Navy. Renamed USS Yosemite, she was commissioned in reserve on 11 November 1911 at the Norfolk Navy Yard in Portsmouth, Virginia, with Ensign Alfred H. Miles – the lyricist of the United States Naval Academy fight song "Anchors Aweigh" – in command.

Based at Norfolk, Virginia, Yosemite served the Navy only very briefly, working as tender to Submarine Division 3 of the Atlantic Torpedo Fleet.

On 23 January 1912, just over two months after her commissioning, Yosemite was decommissioned at Norfolk. Her name was struck from the Navy list on 1 March 1912, and she was sold to the Boston Iron and Metal Works on 10 June 1912 for scrapping.
