= Michel Lévy Frères =

Parisian publishing house

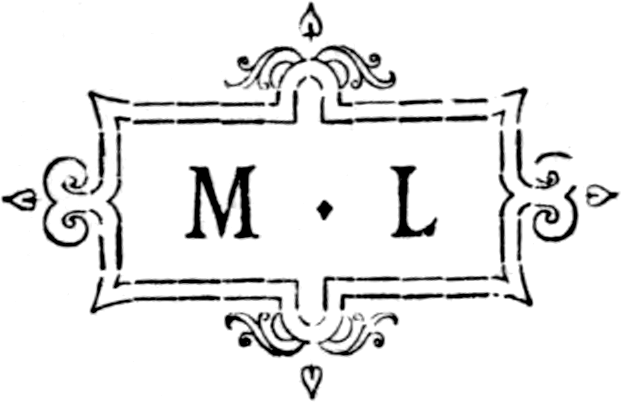
- Founded: 1836
- Founder: Michel Lévy; Nathan Lévy; Kalmus Calmann Lévy
- Successor: Calmann-Lévy
- Country of origin: France
- Headquarters location: Paris
- Publication types: Books

Michel Lévy frères was a Paris publishing house founded in 1836 by Michel Lévy with his brothers Nathan and Kalmus (Calmann). Michel served as publisher until his death in 1875, upon which Kalmus succeeded him and renamed the company Calmann-Lévy.

Michel Lévy frères published such authors as Honoré de Balzac, Gustave Flaubert, and Antoinette Henriette Clémence Robert; some of their works were illustrated by Eugène Lampsonius.
