= 6-inch/40-caliber gun =

6"/40 caliber Mark 4
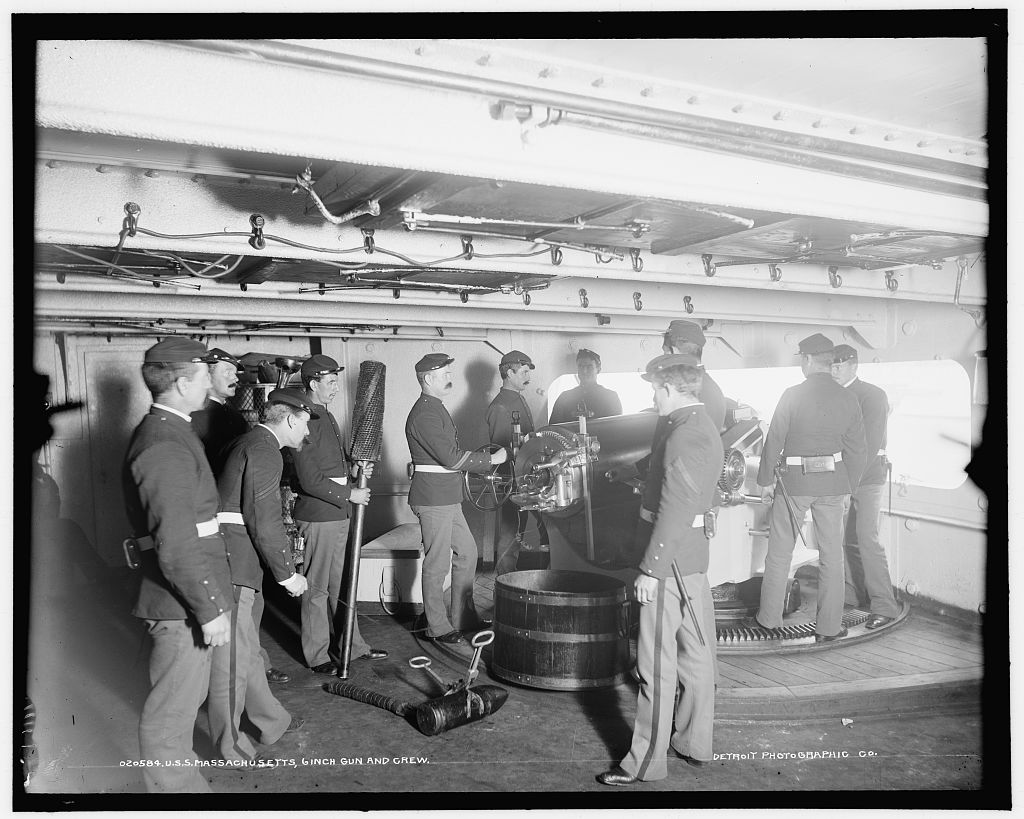
- USS Massachusetts (BB-2), 6-inch/40 caliber gun and crew.
- Type: Naval gun
- Place of origin: United States

Service history
- In service: 1885
- Used by: United States Navy
- Wars: Spanish–American War; World War I

Production history
- Designer: Bureau of Ordnance
- Designed: 1883
- Manufacturer: U.S. Naval Gun Factory
- Produced: 1896 – 1905
- No. built: 72 (Nos. 133–196, 260–263, and 423–426)
- Variants: Mark 4 Mod 0 – Mod 13 (no Mod 6)

Specifications
- Mass: 13,370 lb (6,060 kg) (without breech)
- Length: Mod 0: 256.1 in (6,500 mm); Mod 1: 254.61 in (6,467 mm)
- Barrel length: 240 in (6,100 mm) bore (40 calibers)
- Shell: 105 lb (48 kg) naval armor-piercing
- Caliber: 6 in (152 mm)
- Traverse: −150° to +150°
- Rate of fire: As commissioned: 1.5 rounds per minute; After 1906: 7.6 rounds per minute
- Muzzle velocity: 2,150 ft/s (660 m/s)
- Effective firing range: 9,000 yd (8,200 m) at 15.3° elevation; 18,000 yd (16,000 m) at 30.2° elevation

The 6"/40 caliber gun Mark 4 (spoken "six-inch-forty-caliber") were used for the secondary batteries of the United States Navy's Indiana-class and Illinois-class battleships. They were also used as the main battery on the Cincinnati-class protected cruisers.

== Design ==
The 6-inch (152 mm)/40 caliber Mark 4 guns were developed before the Spanish–American War and still used black powder or brown powder, in later years they were not considered strong enough to withstand the higher chamber pressures generated by the newer smokeless powder adopted around 1898. Many were obsolete before the start of World War I, namely the Mods 0, 1, 2, 3, and 8, and were removed from service, however, since they were stronger than the earlier Mark 1, 2, and 3s, 45 of them were still in active service June 1917.

The first Mark 4, gun No. 133, was completed July 1896. Production numbers were Nos. 133–196, 260–263, and 423–426. It was the first 6-inch Navy gun designed from the beginning to use case, semi-fixed, ammunition. The gun was constructed of gun steel using a tube, jacket, and seven hoops. It was originally threaded to be mounted in the Mark 5 gun mount. Mod 0 was very similar to the Mark 3 Mod 2 but with the breech ring lengthened 0.1 in (2.5 mm), the trunnion hoop removed and the barrel threaded.

Mod 1, No. 155, was of similar construction, but was 0.31 in (7.9 mm) longer, only 4 hoops, and an experimental breech mechanism. The chamber volume was also increased slightly from 1,320 cu in (21,600 cm^{3}) to 1,367 cu in (22,400 cm^{3}). Mod 2, for Mark 6, 7, and 9 gun mounts, was similar but with 1.8 in (46 mm) cut off the breech end of the gun. Only one gun, No. 136, was modified in this way. Mod 3 was similar in construction to the Mod 1 but with its mounting threads located differently and it also had a threaded bronze sleeve. Mod 4 only differed from Mod 1 construction in adding a shoulder for a mounting yoke and with a different location for the mounting threads. The chamber volume was reduced slightly to 1,355 cu in (22,200 cm^{3}). Mod 5 only differed from Mod 4 in adding a muzzle bell. Mod 6 was skipped and Mod 7 was an experimental Mod 4 bored out to use bag ammunition, a 1,367 cu in chamber, 1.83 in (46 mm) think faceplate added to the breech end, and a trunnion hoop added. With Mod 8, gun No. 161, a Mod 4 gun, a 30 in (760 mm) muzzle liner and muzzle bell were used and the rifling was a uniform 1/25 instead of 0 to 1/35. Mod 9 was a Mod 4 using a tube constructed of nickel-steel instead of the normal gun-metal and again the rifling was a uniform 1/25. Mod 10 used a Mod 4 had a two-step cylindrical nickel-steel liner with the rifling changed to 0 to 1/25. Mod 11 used a Mod 4 but with only a one-step cylindrical nickel-steel liner and with a uniform 1/25 rifling. Mod 12 also used a Mod 4 with a nickel-steel liner and a 0 to 1/25 increasing twist rifling. The last Mod, Mod 13 consisted of a Mod 5 with a nickel-steel liner and the using an increasing twist rifling of 0 to 1/25.

== Naval service ==
Ship	Gun installed	Gun mount
USS Indiana (BB-1)	Mark 4: 6"/40 caliber	Mark 5: 4 × central-pivot
USS Massachusetts (BB-2)	Mark 4: 6"/40 caliber	Mark 5: 4 × central-pivot
USS Oregon (BB-3)	Mark 4: 6"/40 caliber	Mark 5: 4 × central-pivot
USS Illinois (BB-7)	Mark 4: 6"/40 caliber	Mark 4: 14 × pedestal mount; Mark 7: 14 × pedestal mount (refit by 1905)
USS Alabama (BB-8)	Mark 4: 6"/40 caliber	Mark 4: 14 × pedestal mount; Mark 7: 14 × pedestal mount (refit by 1905)
USS Wisconsin (BB-9)	Mark 4: 6"/40 caliber	Mark 6: 14 × pedestal mount; Mark 7: 14 × pedestal mount (refit by 1905)
USS Cincinnati (C-7)	Mark 4: 6"/40 caliber	Mark 6: 1 × pedestal mount
USS Raleigh (C-8)	Mark 3: 6"/40 caliber	Mark 6: 1 × pedestal mount

== See also ==
- 6"/30 caliber gun – includes 6"/40 caliber Mark 3 guns

=== Weapons of comparable role, performance and era ===
- QF 6 inch /40 naval gun British equivalent
- 15 cm SK L/40 naval gun German equivalent
