= List of ship commissionings in 1898 =

The list of ship commissionings in 1898 includes a chronological list of ships commissioned in 1898. In cases where no official commissioning ceremony was held, the date of service entry may be used instead.

Date	Operator	Ship	Class and type	Notes	
January 13	Royal Navy	HMS Caesar	Majestic-class battleship		
8 February	Spanish Navy	Proserpina		Furor-class destroyer	–
8 March	Spanish Navy	Audaz		Furor-class destroyer	–
8 March	Spanish Navy	Osado		Furor-class destroyer	–
April 2	United States Navy	USS Rodgers	Torpedo boat		
April 12	United States Navy	USS Nahant	Passaic-class monitor	Recommissioned for Spanish–American War service	
April 15	Royal Navy	HMS Illustrious	Majestic-class battleship		
April 26	United States Navy	USS Catskill	Passaic-class monitor	Recommissioned for Spanish–American War service	
April (unknown date)	Royal Navy	HMS Hannibal	Majestic-class battleship		
May 13	United States Navy	USS Sangamon	Passaic-class monitor	Recommissioned for Spanish–American War service	
May 16	United States Navy	USS Passaic	Passaic-class monitor	Recommissioned for Spanish–American War service	
May 20	United States Navy	USS Abarenda	Collier	Former merchant ship by the same name purchased from J. Graham; commissioned at New York Navy Yard.	
June	French Navy	Masséna	Pre-dreadnought battleship		
June	French Navy	Bouvet	Pre-dreadnought battleship		
July	Imperial German Navy	Hertha	Victoria Louise-class protected cruiser		
October 7	Imperial German Navy	SMS Kaiser Friedrich III	Kaiser Friedrich III-class battleship		
Unknown date	Spanish Navy	Giralda	Aviso	Former steam yacht. Commissioned late March or April.	
