= Furor =

Furor may refer to:

- Furor-class destroyer, a class of Spanish Navy destroyers
- Spanish ship Furor, various ships of the Spanish Navy
- Furor, a musical composition by Juan María Solare

== See also ==
- Führer, a German word meaning "leader" or "guide" and the title held by Adolf Hitler
- Fury (disambiguation)
