= Spanish destroyer Plutón =

Spanish Navy destroyer of 1897–1898

History

Spain
- Name: Plutón
- Namesake: Pluto, Roman god of the underworld
- Awarded: 24 November 1896
- Builder: James and George Thomson/ Clydebank Engineering & Shipbuilding Company, Clydebank, Scotland, United Kingdom
- Laid down: 12 February 1897
- Launched: 13 July 1897
- Completed: 4 November 1897
- Commissioned: 29 December 1897
- Fate: Sunk 3 July 1898

General characteristics
- Class & type: Furor-class destroyer
- Displacement: 400 tons
- Length: 225 ft 0 in (68.58 m)
- Beam: 22 ft 6 in (6.86 m)
- Draft: 5 ft 9 in (1.75 m)
- Installed power: 7,500 ihp (5,600 kW)
- Propulsion: 2-shaft triple expansion, 4 Normand boilers
- Speed: 30 knots (56 km/h; 35 mph)
- Complement: 67 officers and enlisted
- Armament: 2 × 14 pdr quick-firing guns; 8 × 6 pdr quick-firing guns; 2 × 1 pdr Maxim guns, 2 × torpedo tubes
- Notes: 96 tons coal (normal)

Plutón was a Furor-class destroyer of the Spanish Navy commissioned in 1897. She fought in the Spanish-American War, during which she was sunk at the Battle of Santiago de Cuba in 1898.

== Construction and commissioning ==
In April 1896, the Minister of the Navy, Vicealmirante (Vice Admiral) José María Beránger, presented a new naval program that included the construction of two additional Furor-class destroyers, larger than but with the same armament as the first two ships, Furor and Terror. The two additional destroyers became Audaz and Osado. Spain then expanded its order to include another two Furor-class destroyers of the enlarged design, and these became Plutón and Proserpina, named respectively for Pluto, the Roman god of the underworld, and Proserpina, Pluto's wife and the goddess of spring. The three-funneled ships were, in the parlance of the day, "torpedo boat destroyers," designed to protect larger ships against torpedo boat attack and also carrying torpedoes with which to attack larger ships themselves.

The Spanish government signed the contract for the construction of Plutón and Proserpina with the shipyard of James and George Thomson on 24 November 1896. The Thomson shipyard at Clydebank, Scotland, in the United Kingdom laid the keel of Plutón on 12 February 1897. The company changed its name to the Clydebank Engineering & Shipbuilding Company in April 1897 and under this name launched her on 13 August 1897 and completed her on 4 November 1897. Although the construction of Audaz, Osado, and Proserpina experienced delays, Plutón was delivered to the Spanish Navy on time and was commissioned on 29 December 1897.

The cost of construction of Plutón and Proserpina combined was about 4,800,000 pesetas. This was about 200,000 pesetas more than the contracted price.

== Operational history ==
=== Spanish-American War ===
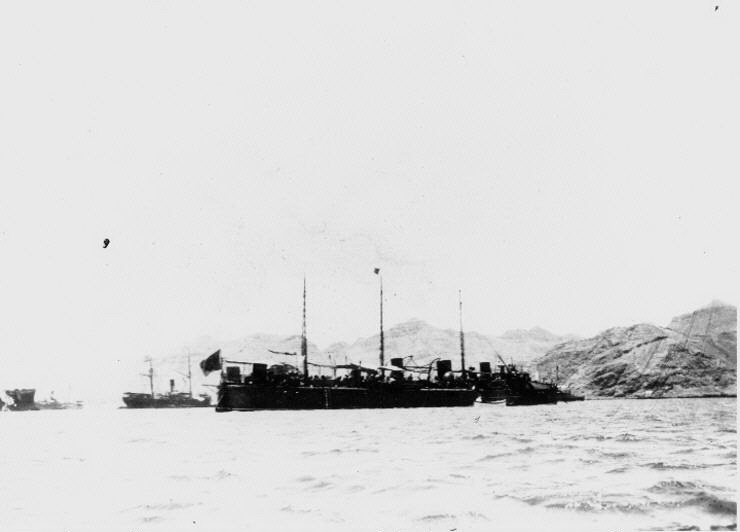
An unidentified Spanish destroyer—either Plutón, Furor, or Terror—with Cervera's squadron at São Vicente sometime between 14 and 29 April 1898.

As tensions between Spain and the United States grew in early 1898, Plutón became part of the 1st Torpedo Boat Division in February 1898 and on 12 February departed Ferrol bound for Cádiz. The division also included Furor, Terror, and the torpedo boats Ariete, Azor, and Rayo. Furor served as flagship of the division's commander, Capitán de navío (Ship-of-the-Line Captain) Fernando Villaamil. The division was assigned to the Spanish Navy's 1st Squadron, commanded by Contralmirante (Counter Admiral) Pascual Cervera y Topete. The squadron was ordered to concentrate at São Vicente in Portugal's Cape Verde Islands. Accordingly, the three destroyers and three torpedo boats departed Cádiz on 12 March and proceeded to São Vicente in company. The armored cruisers Infanta Maria Teresa (Cervera's flagship) and Cristobal Colon departed Cádiz on 8 April and arrived at São Vicente on 14 April. The ships had experienced mechanical problems and burned an excessive amount of coal during the voyage. Soon, the armored cruisers Almirante Oquendo and Vizcaya reinforced the squadron.

While Plutón was at São Vicente, the Spanish–American War began when the United States declared war on Spain on 25 April 1898, stipulating that the declaration was retroactive to 25 April. Neutral Portugal, in accordance with international law, ordered the Spanish ships to leave São Vicente within 24 hours of the declaration of war. Leaving Ariete, Azor, and Rayo — which were too small for a transatlantic voyage — behind at São Vicente, Plutón and the rest of Cervera's squadron departed — after coaling delays — on 29 April 1898, bound for San Juan, Puerto Rico. The 1st Torpedo Boat Division was incorporated directly into Cervera's squadron, leaving Villaamil with no formal command responsibilities, but he chose to remain aboard Furor for the deployment to the Caribbean anyway. Because of continuing engine trouble and low coal supplies, Plutón and her fellow destroyers were towed part of the way across the Atlantic Ocean, casting off to steam under their own power when two days from landfall in the Caribbean. Cervera's ships reached the vicinity of French-owned Martinique in the Lesser Antilles on 10 May 1898.

Minister of the Navy Bermejo's communications with Cervera while Cervera was at São Vicente had not made clear that the United States had declared war, but Cervera did have orders from Bermejo to gather information at Fort-de-France on Martinique. When the squadron arrived in the vicinity of Martinique, Cervera ordered Villaamil to take Furor and Terror into port at Fort-de-France to gather intelligence on U.S. naval operations and ascertain whether a collier with 5,000 tons of coal would be awaiting his squadron at Curaçao.

While Plutón and the four armored cruisers remained in international waters, steaming slowly toward the Saint Lucia Channel north of Martinique, Furor and Terror detached from the squadron under Villaamil's command at 10:00 on 10 May 1898. Shortly after the squadron lost sight of the two destroyers, Terror suffered a boiler explosion that crippled her. Furor took Terror under tow. At dawn on 11 May, Cervera's squadron sighted two columns of smoke on the horizon and prepared for action on the assumption that it came from approaching U.S. warships, but soon determined that it came from Furor and Terror, which were approaching very slowly. With Terror and Cervera's squadron in sight of one another, Furor dropped her tow line and proceeded alone toward Fort-de-France.

At dusk on 11 May, Cervera's squadron approached Martinique to rendezvous with Furor. In the predawn darkness of 12 May, the squadron sighted Furor′s searchlight blinking the letter "R" in Morse code — the agreed-upon recognition signal — and Infanta Maria Teresa responded with the letter "A," confirming her identity as well. Furor thus rejoined the squadron, and Villaamil came aboard Infanta Maria Teresa at around 03:00 to provide a report to Cervera, including newspaper clippings confirming that Spain was at war with the United States. Cervera ordered Terror′s 75 mm (3-inch) guns to be transferred to Infanta Maria Teresa, and the squadron then towed the crippled Terror to the vicinity of Fort-de-France so that she could put into port there for repairs.

Leaving Terror behind, Plutón and the rest of Cervera's squadron set out on 12 May 1898 for Dutch-owned Curaçao, where Cervera expected to meet a collier, unaware that Bermejo had ordered the collier to Martinique instead. The squadron arrived at Willemstad on 14 May, but the Netherlands also was neutral, and strictly enforced its neutrality by allowing only Vizcaya and Infanta Maria Teresa to enter port and permitting them to load only 600 tons of coal. On 15 May, Cervera's ships departed, no longer bound for San Juan, which by now was under a U.S. Navy blockade, but for as-yet unblockaded Santiago de Cuba on the southeastern coast of Cuba, arriving there on 19 May 1898. Cervera hoped to refit his ships there before he could be trapped. His squadron was still in the harbor of Santiago de Cuba when the U.S. Navy′s Flying Squadron arrived on 27 May 1898 and began a blockade which would drag on for 37 days. The U.S. Navy's North Atlantic Squadron arrived off Santiago de Cuba on 1 June 1898 to reinforce the Flying Squadron.

On 3 June 1898, the U.S. Navy steamed the collier USS Merrimac into the entrance channel to the harbor, hoping to scuttle her so as to block the channel and trap the Spanish ships inside. Spanish shore batteries already had disabled Merrimac when she struck a mine and drifted up the channel to a point where the Spanish ships could fire on her as well. Plutón, Vizcaya, and the unprotected cruiser Reina Mercedes all opened fire, and Merrimac quickly sank in a position that did not block the entrance. Apparently, a torpedo from Plutón gave the coup de grâce to Merrimac.

The blockade wore on, with Plutón and the other ships enduring occasional American naval bombardments of the harbor. Some of Plutón′s men joined others from the fleet in a "Naval Brigade" to fight alongside Spanish Army troops against a United States Army overland drive toward Santiago de Cuba.

=== Battle of Santiago de Cuba ===
By the beginning of July 1898, the American overland drive threatened to capture Santiago de Cuba, and Cervera decided that his squadron's only hope was to try to escape into the open sea by running the blockade. The decision was made on 1 July 1898, with the break-out set for 3 July 1898. The crew of Plutón spent 2 July 1898 returning from Naval Brigade service and preparing for action. Plutón was to be the sixth and last ship in line during the escape, following the four armored cruisers and Furor. While Infanta Maria Teresa sacrificed herself by attacking the fastest American ship, the armored cruiser USS Brooklyn, Plutón and the others were to avoid action, put on all the speed they could, and run for the open sea.

At about 08:45 on 3 July 1898, the Spanish ships got underway. The U.S. squadron sighted the Spanish ships in the channel at about 09:35, and the Battle of Santiago de Cuba began.

While the four armored cruisers turned to starboard to run westward, Furor and Plutón turned inside them and made their run closer to the coast. The blockading American battleships and armored cruisers opened fire on the two destroyers as they emerged from the channel, hitting both destroyers several times, but then turned their attention to pursuing the Spanish armored cruisers. The two damaged destroyers put on speed, pursued only by the armed yacht USS Gloucester, a ship less well armed than the destroyers, but larger, faster, and undamaged. Gloucester hit both destroyers repeatedly. A large-caliber shell struck Plutón and, too badly damaged to continue, she ran herself aground at 10:45 on the beach just west of Cabanas Bay, almost broken in two and a total loss, with heavy loss of life. Those of her crew who got ashore had to beware of Cuban insurgents, who began shooting Spanish sailors they found along the shore. Other survivors were taken off by U.S. sailors who brought small boats alongside her wreck.
