= Spanish destroyer Terror =

Furor-class destroyer of the Spanish Navy

History

Spain
- Name: Terror
- Ordered: 15 April 1895 (authorized)
- Awarded: 23 December 1895
- Builder: James and George Thomson/ Clydebank Engineering & Shipbuilding Company, Clydebank, Scotland, United Kingdom
- Laid down: 9 February 1896
- Launched: 10 or 28 August 1896
- Completed: 20 November 1896
- Commissioned: 17 December 1896
- Decommissioned: 30 October 1922
- Fate: Scrapped 1924

General characteristics
- Class & type: Furor-class destroyer
- Displacement: 370 tons
- Length: 220 ft 0 in (67.06 m)
- Beam: 22 ft 0 in (6.71 m)
- Draft: 5 ft 6 in (1.68 m)
- Installed power: 6,000 ihp (4,500 kW)
- Propulsion: 2-shaft, 4-cylinder triple expansion, 4 Normand boilers
- Speed: 28 knots (52 km/h; 32 mph)
- Complement: 67 officers and enlisted
- Armament: 2 × 14 pdr 75 mm (3 in) quick-firing guns; 8 × 6 pdr 57 mm (2.2 in) quick-firing guns; 2 × 1 pdr pom-pom Maxim guns; 2 × torpedo tubes
- Notes: 100 tons coal (normal)

Terror was a Furor-class destroyer in commission in the Spanish Navy from 1896 to 1922. She fought in the Spanish-American War in 1898, seeing action in the Second Battle of San Juan off Puerto Rico. She also operated in support of Spanish forces in Morocco during the Second Melillan Campaign in 1909. She was eqipped for minelaying around 1920.

== Construction and commissioning ==
The Spanish government authorized the construction of the first two Furor-class destroyers — three-funnelled "torpedo boat destroyers" in the parlance of the day, designed to protect larger ships against torpedo boat attack, but also carrying torpedoes with which to attack larger ships themselves — on 15 April 1895. The Minister of the Navy, Vicealmirante (Vice Admiral) José María Beránger, signed the formal contract for their construction with the shipyard of James and George Thomson on 23 December 1895. Terror′s keel was laid on 9 February 1896. Sources disagree on her launch date, claiming that her launch occurred both on 10 August 1896, and on 28 August 1896. She was completed on 20 November 1896 (Note: The historical database Todoavante presents a chronological contradiction, stating the contract was signed on 23 December 1895 but claiming the keels were laid down earlier, on 1 November 1895. British shipyard logs and standard naval reference texts resolve this by confirming that actual construction on the slipways began when Terror′s keel was laid on 9 February 1896.) and was commissioned on 17 December 1896.

== Operational history ==
=== 1897 ===
Terror and her sister ship Furor — ordered under the same contract — departed Falmouth, Cornwall, on their delivery voyage to Spain on 27 January 1897. Terror and Furor operated in the Mediterranean Sea, then arrived at Cádiz in July 1897 to have their hulls cleaned. Upon completion of the work, the two destroyers joined the Training Squadron, then under the command of Contralmirante (Counter Admiral) Segismundo Bermejo y Merelo.

Appointed to serve as Minister of the Navy, Bermejo relinquished command of the Training Squadron, and Contralmirante (Counter Admiral) Pascual Cervera y Topete took command on 30 October 1897. Under Cervera, the squadron's heavy ships — the armored cruisers Almirante Oquendo, Infanta Maria Teresa, Vizcaya, and Cristóbal Colón — departed Cádiz on 27 November 1897 to carry out maneuvers off Santa Pola, leaving Terror, Furor, and the warship Destructor — a fast torpedo gunboat often considered the world's first destroyer — behind to have their hulls cleaned. When that work was done, Furor, Terror, and Destructor departed Cádiz and called at Málaga from 10 to 12 December before proceeding to Santa Pola to join the maneuvers. The maneuvers — limited by Minister of the Navy Bermejo's advice that Cervera conserve fuel and ammunition — focused on crew training and testing of the ships' guns, although the armored cruisers were permitted to fire only two rounds from each of their large-caliber guns. Furor, Terror, Destructor, and the torpedo boats Ariete, Azor, and Rayo joined together for several exercises during the maneuvers, including mock night attacks on the armored cruisers. The maneuvers wrapped up on 22 December 1897, and the squadron called at Alicante on 23 December and arrived at Cartagena on 28 December 1897.

=== Spanish-American War ===
==== Cervera's squadron ====
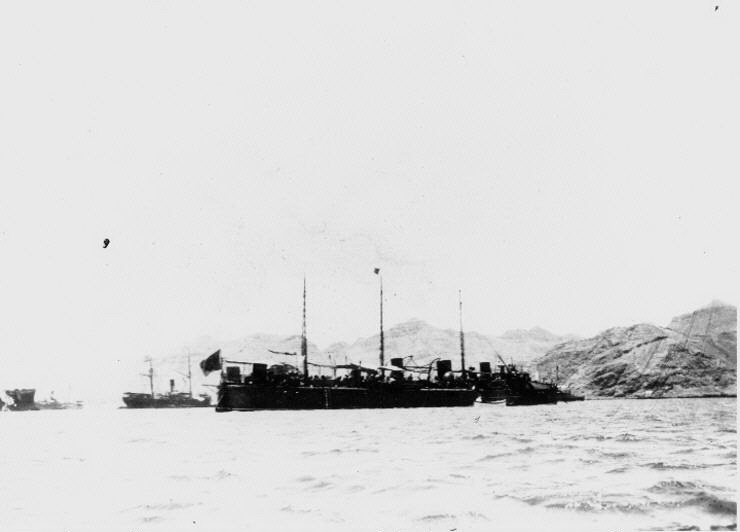
An unidentified Spanish destroyer – either Terror, Furor, or Plutón – with Cervera's squadron at São Vicente sometime between 14 and 29 April 1898.

As tensions between Spain and the United States grew in early 1898, Terror became part of the 1st Torpedo Boat Division, which also included Furor, the destroyer Plutón, and the torpedo boats Ariete, Azor, and Rayo. Furor served as flagship of the division's commander, Capitán de navío (Ship-of-the-Line Captain) Fernando Villaamil. The division was assigned to the Spanish Navy's 1st Squadron, commanded by Cervera. The squadron was ordered to concentrate at São Vicente in Portugal's Cape Verde Islands. Accordingly, the three destroyers departed Cádiz on 12 March and proceeded to São Vicente in company. Infanta Maria Teresa (Cervera's flagship) and Cristobal Colon departed Cádiz on 8 April and arrived at São Vicente on 14 April. The ships had experienced mechanical problems and burned an excessive amount of coal during the voyage. Soon, Almirante Oquendo and Vizcaya reinforced the squadron.

While Terror was at São Vicente, the Spanish–American War began when the United States declared war on Spain on 25 April 1898, stipulating that the declaration was retroactive to 21 April. Neutral Portugal, in accordance with international law, ordered the Spanish ships to leave São Vicente within 24 hours of the declaration of war. Leaving Ariete, Azor, and Rayo — which were too small for a transatlantic voyage — behind at São Vicente, Terror and the rest of Cervera's squadron departed — after coaling delays — on 29 April 1898, bound for San Juan, Puerto Rico. The 1st Torpedo Boat Division was incorporated directly into Cervera's squadron, leaving Villaamil with no formal command responsibilities, but he chose to remain aboard Furor for the deployment to the Caribbean anyway. Because of continuing engine trouble and low coal supplies, Terror and her fellow destroyers were towed part of the way across the Atlantic Ocean, casting off to steam under their own power when two days from landfall in the Caribbean. Cervera's ships reached the vicinity of French-owned Martinique in the Lesser Antilles on 10 May 1898.

Minister of the Navy Bermejo's communications with Cervera while Cervera was at São Vicente had not made clear that the United States had declared war, but Cervera did have orders from Bermejo to gather information at Fort-de-France on Martinique. When the squadron arrived in the vicinity of Martinique, Cervera ordered Villaamil to take Furor and Terror into port at Fort-de-France to gather intelligence on U.S. naval operations and ascertain whether a collier with 5,000 tons of coal would be awaiting his squadron at Curaçao.

While the other ships remained in international waters, steaming slowly toward the Saint Lucia Channel north of Martinique, Furor and Terror detached from the squadron under Villaamil's command at 10:00 on 10 May 1898. Shortly after the squadron lost sight of the two destroyers, Terror suffered a boiler explosion that crippled her. Furor took Terror under tow. At dawn on 11 May, Cervera's squadron sighted two columns of smoke on the horizon and prepared for action on the assumption that it came from approaching U.S. warships, but soon determined that it came from Furor and Terror, which were approaching very slowly. With Terror and Cervera's squadron in sight of one another, Furor dropped her tow line and proceeded alone toward Fort-de-France. The disabled Terror thus rejoined the squadron.

At dusk on 11 May, Cervera's squadron approached Martinique to rendezvous with Furor. In the predawn darkness of 12 May, the squadron sighted Furor′s searchlight blinking the letter "R" in Morse code — the agreed-upon recognition signal — and Infanta Maria Teresa responded with the letter "A," confirming her identity as well. Furor thus rejoined the squadron, and Villaamil came aboard Infanta Maria Teresa at around 03:00 to provide a report to Cervera, including newspaper clippings confirming that Spain was at war with the United States. Cervera ordered Terror′s 75 mm (3-inch) guns to be transferred to Infanta Maria Teresa, and the squadron then towed the crippled Terror to the vicinity of Fort-de-France so that she could put into port there for repairs. Leaving Terror behind, Cervera's squadron parted company with her on 12 May 1898 to continue its operations without her and abandoned its plans to steam to San Juan.

==== San Juan ====
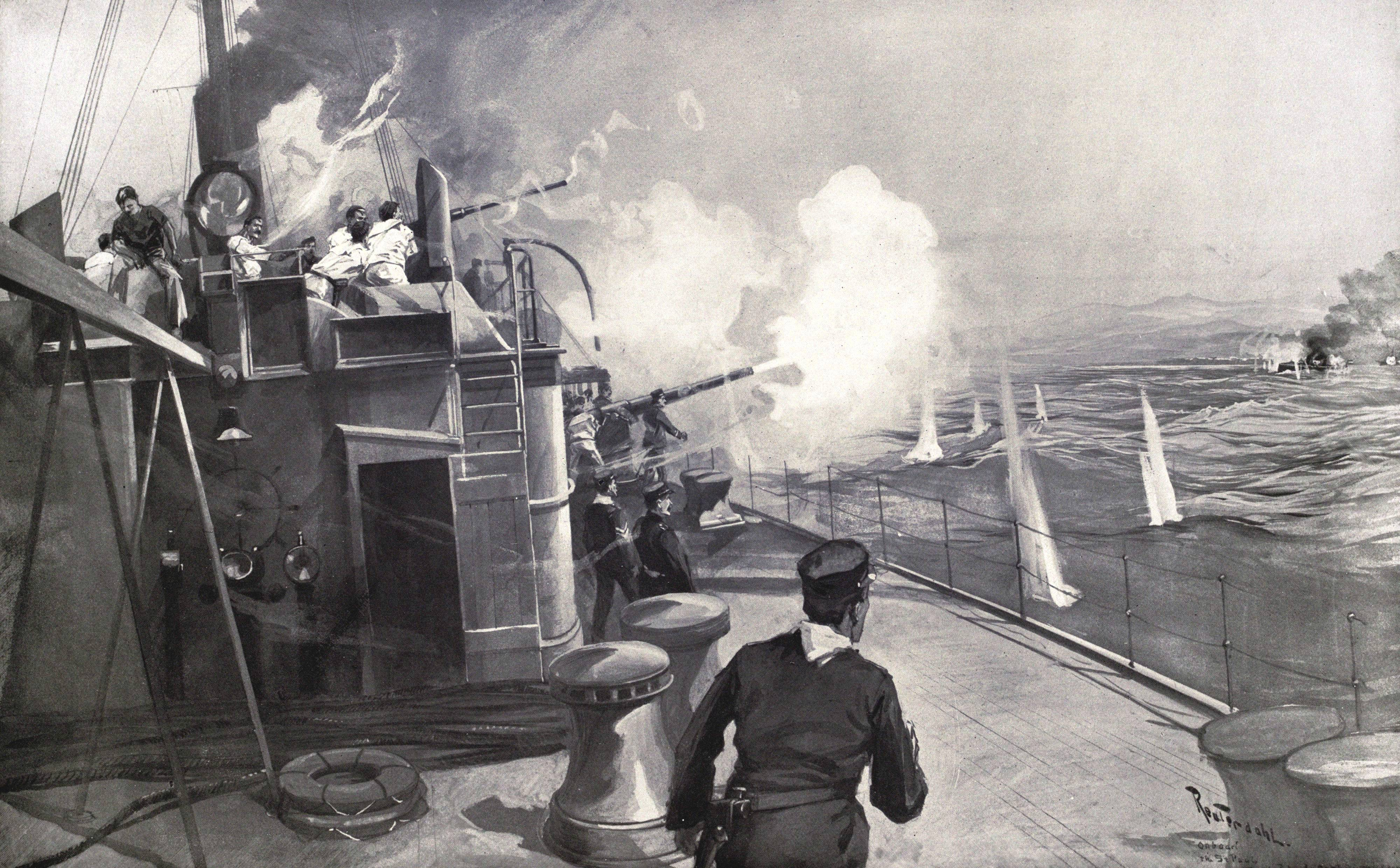
A view from the United States Navy auxiliary cruiser USS St. Paul as she drives off Terror (in the distance at right) during the Second Battle of San Juan on 22 June 1898.(Illustration from Harper′s Pictorial History of the War with Spain, Volume II, 1899)

Terror carried out repairs at Fort-de-France. By the time they were completed, Cervera's squadron was at Santiago de Cuba on the southeastern coast of Cuba. Deeming a voyage to join Cervera there too risky, Terror′s commanding officer opted instead to proceed to the squadron's originally intended destination, San Juan, to join the defenses there. Terror arrived at San Juan on 27 May 1898.

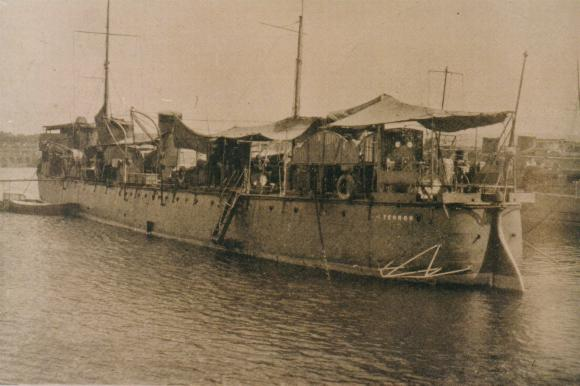
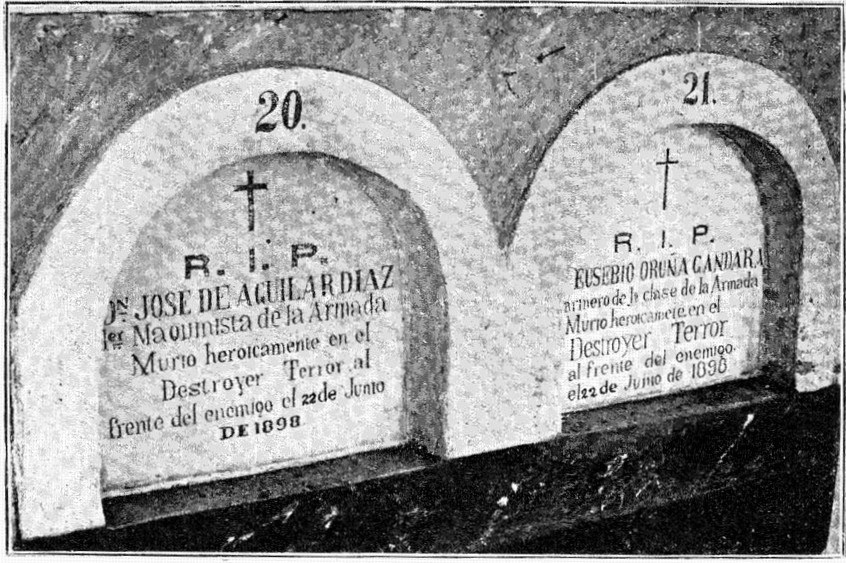
LEFT: The damaged Terror at San Juan, Puerto Rico, after the Second Battle of San Juan. RIGHT: The tombstones of the two men killed when Terror was damaged during the battle.

Little happened until the United States Navy established a permanent blockade of San Juan on 18 June 1898. On 22 June 1898, the unprotected cruiser Isabel II, the gunboat General Concha, and Terror came out of port to test the blockade, resulting in the Second Battle of San Juan. The U.S. auxiliary cruiser USS St. Paul moved in, resulting in a short, running gun battle, from which the Spanish quickly broke away. Isabel II and General Concha could go no faster than 10 knots (19 km/h); in order to cover their retreat, Terror began a torpedo run on St. Paul, which opened fire at 5,400 yards (4,900 metres). She hit Terror repeatedly, killing two men — the only casualties either side suffered in the action — and putting a hole in the destroyer's side. Severely damaged, Terror retreated and beached herself to avoid sinking.

Terror spent the rest of the war under repair at San Juan. Repairs were completed on 14 September 1898, a month after the war ended, and she returned to Spain. The conflict had resulted in heavy losses for the Spanish Navy, and the Spanish Empire lost control of Cuba, Puerto Rico, the Philippines, and Guam.

=== 1899–1922 ===
During the early years of the 20th century, Terror′s activity was limited. On the afternoon of 7 July 1908 she arrived at Almería in company with the torpedo boats Acevedo, Barceló, and Ordóñez. In August 1908, Terror was in the Cantabrian Sea along the northern coast of Spain during regattas held off Santander. After the regattas, King Alfonso XIII left Santander aboard the royal yacht Giralda bound for San Sebastián under escort by Terror.

Terror and her sister ships Audaz and Osado were assigned to the Training Squadron — which served as the Spanish Navy's home squadron —in 1909. Audaz, Osado and the armored cruiser Princesa de Asturias departed San Sebastián at 10:00 on 21 July 1909 bound for Ferrol, and on 21 July Terror and the armored cruiser Spanish cruiser Emperador Carlos V got underway from San Sebastián to rendezvous with them at Ferrol. At Ferrol, the Training Squadron received King Alfonso XIII, who arrived aboard Giralda on 22 July.

The Second Melillan Campaign, which pitted Spanish forces against Riffian tribes in northern Morocco around Melilla, began in July 1909. That summer and autumn, Terror operated off North Africa in support of Spanish forces fighting in the campaign as part of a squadron that patrolled the coast to prevent smuggling and defend coastal ship traffic from attacks by the Riffians. By early September 1909, the squadron also included Audaz, the first-class gunboats Álvaro de Bazán, Doña María de Molina, and Marqués de la Victoria, and the second-class gunboats Hernán Cortés, Ponce de León, and Vasco Núñez de Balboa. After patrolling off Larache and Casablanca, Terror arrived at Cádiz on 13 October 1909. On 14 October, she entered the Arsenal de La Carraca at San Fernando to have her hull cleaned.

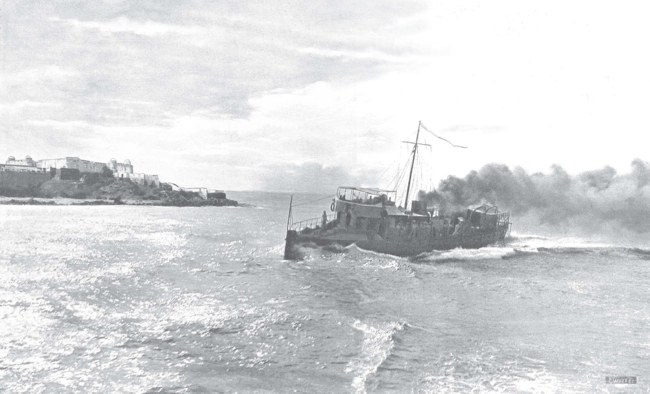
Terror off Larache, Morocco, in 1911.

Although the Second Melillan Campaign ended in December 1909, Terror returned to North Africa and continued to patrol the coast. When King Alfonso XIII visited Melilla on 8 January 1911 aboard Giralda, his escort included Terror, Audaz, Princesa de Asturias, Álvaro de Bazán, the armored cruiser Cataluña, the protected cruisers Extremadura and Río de la Plata, the coastal defense ship Numancia, and the transport Almirante Lobo. On 13 June 1911 Terror arrived at Cádiz after a voyage from Larache with news of further incidents between Riffians and Spaniards in Morocco.

Spain remained neutral during World War I (1914–1918). During the early part of the war, Terror was stationed in the Canary Islands. On the morning of 8 November 1916, she departed from Ferrol in company with the destroyers Bustamante and Villaamil to join the squadron at Muros. During the voyage, the ships encountered a severe storm. Bustamante reached Muros, but Villaamil suffered damage that forced her to return to Ferrol. Terror did not reach any port, and several ships, including the battleships España and Alfonso XIII, put to sea to search for her along the coast. Searchers found her adrift due to engine failure and towed her to Ferrol.

Around 1920, Terror was equipped for minelaying.

== Disposal ==
Terror was placed in reserve at Ferrol early in 1922 and was decommissioned on 30 October 1922. She was scrapped in 1924.
