= Spanish ship Furor =

Furor has been the name of three ships of the Spanish Navy:

- Spanish destroyer Furor (1896), a Furor class destroyer commissioned in 1896 and sunk in 1898
- Spanish destroyer Furor (D-34), an Audaz class destroyer in commission from 1960 to 1974
- Spanish patrol vessel Furor (P-46), a Meteoro class patrol vessel commissioned in 2019

== See also ==
- Furor-class destroyer
