= Spanish destroyer Osado (1897) =

Spanish Navy destroyer of 1898–1925

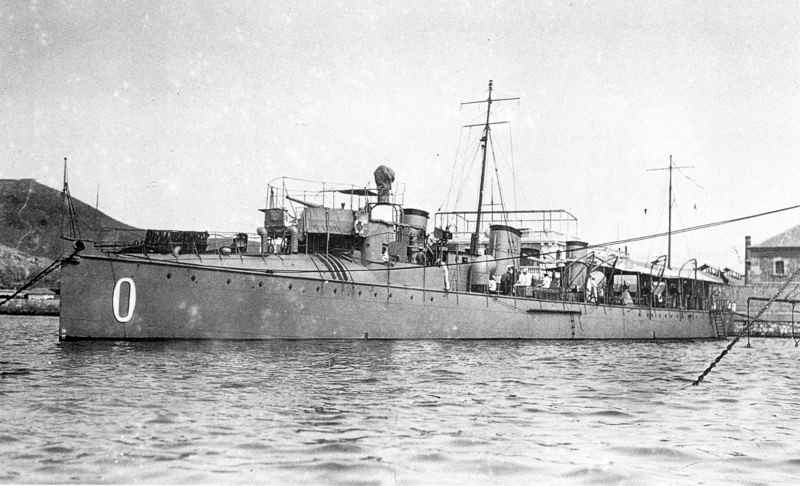
- Osado in 1920.

History

Spain
- Name: Osado
- Namesake: Daring
- Awarded: 4 June 1896
- Builder: James and George Thomson/ Clydebank Engineering & Shipbuilding Company, Clydebank, Scotland, United Kingdom
- Laid down: 1896
- Launched: 6 February 1897
- Commissioned: 8 March 1898
- Decommissioned: 1 January 1925
- Fate: Scrapped 1925

General characteristics
- Class & type: Furor-class destroyer
- Displacement: 400 tons
- Length: 225 ft 0 in (68.58 m)
- Beam: 22 ft 6 in (6.86 m)
- Draft: 5 ft 9 in (1.75 m)
- Installed power: 7,500 ihp (5,600 kW)
- Propulsion: 2-shaft triple expansion, 4 Normand boilers
- Speed: 30 knots (56 km/h; 35 mph)
- Complement: 67 officers and enlisted
- Armament: 2 × 14 pdr quick-firing guns; 8 × 6 pdr quick-firing guns; 2 × 1 pdr Maxim guns, 2 × torpedo tubes
- Notes: 96 tons coal (normal)

Osado ("Daring") was a Furor-class destroyer of the Spanish Navy in commission from 1898 to 1925. She served during the Spanish-American War in 1898 and the Second Melillan Campaign in 1909. She was equipped for minelaying around 1920.

== Construction and commissioning ==
In April 1896, the Minister of the Navy, Vicealmirante (Vice Admiral) José María Beránger, presented a new naval program that included the construction of two additional Furor-class destroyers, larger than but with the same armament as the first two ships, Furor and Terror. The two additional destroyers became Audaz and Osado. Spain later expanded its order to include another two Furor-class destroyers of the enlarged design, and these became Plutón and Proserpina. The three-funnelled ships were, in the parlance of the day, "torpedo boat destroyers," designed to protect larger ships against torpedo boat attack and also carrying torpedoes with which to attack larger ships themselves.

The Spanish government signed the contract for the construction of Audaz and Osado with the shipyard of James and George Thomson on 4 June 1896. The Thomson shipyard at Clydebank, Scotland, in the United Kingdom laid her keel soon afterwards. The company changed its name to the Clydebank Engineering & Shipbuilding Company in April 1897, and under this name launched Osado on 6 May 1897 and delivered her to the Spanish Navy on 8 March 1898.

Osado′s construction cost was just over 2,000,000 pesetas. Although Plutón was delivered to the Spanish Navy on time, the construction of Audaz, Osado, and Proserpina experienced a delay of eight months. The Spanish government sued the shipyard in the British courts, which finally resulted in a judgment in February 1903 requiring Clydebank Engineering & Shipbuilding to pay the Spanish government 67,500 pounds in damages.

== Service history ==
=== Spanish-American War ===
The United States Navy armored cruiser USS Maine, often referred to as a "battleship," had sunk due to an explosion while anchored in the harbor at Havana, Cuba, on 15 February 1898, and by the time Osado completed her delivery voyage to Spain with her arrival at Ferrol on 6 April 1898, anti-Spanish sentiment in the United States had grown to the point that Spain had begun to prepare for war between the two countries. Osado became part of the 2nd Torpedo Boat Squadron, which also included Audaz, Proserpina, and the torpedo boats Halcón, Orión, and Retamosa.

The United States declared war on Spain on 25 April 1898, stipulating that the declaration was retroactive to 21 April. Shortly thereafter, the Spanish Ministry of the Navy ordered warships — Osado among them — to concentrate at Cádiz to form the 2nd Squadron under the overall command of Contralmirante (Counter Admiral) Manuel de la Cámara y Livermoore. One mission of the squadron, in the absence of any other direction, was to guard the Spanish coast against raids by the U.S. Navy. While Cámara's squadron lay idle at Cádiz, the U.S. Navy's Asiatic Squadron under Commodore George Dewey destroyed the Spanish Navy's Pacific Squadron under Contralmirante (Counter Admiral) Patricio Montojo y Pasaron in the Philippine Islands in the Battle of Manila Bay on 1 May 1898, and the Spanish Navy's 1st Squadron, under Contralmirante (Counter Admiral) Pascual Cervera y Topete became trapped in the harbor of Santiago de Cuba on the southeastern coast of Cuba on 27 May 1898, blockaded there by the U.S. Navy's Flying Squadron, reinforced by the North Atlantic Squadron on 1 June.

On 15 June 1898, Cámara finally received his orders: He was to depart immediately for the Philippines, escorting a convoy carrying 4,000 Spanish Army troops for reinforcement of the Philippines, and destroy Dewey's squadron there. His orders directed him to depart Cádiz with the battleship Pelayo (Cámara′s flagship); the armored cruiser Emperador Carlos V; the auxiliary cruisers Patriota and Rapido; a destroyer flotilla under the command of Capitán de navío (Ship-of-the-Line Captain) José Ferrándiz y Niño — a future vicealmirante (vice admiral) and minister of the navy — consisting of Audaz (Ferrándiz′s flagship), Osado, and Proserpina; the transports Buenos Aires, Panay, Alfonso XII, and Antonio Lopez; and four colliers carrying 20,000 tons of coal. He was to detach Alfonso XII and Antonio Lopez near Gibraltar after dark so that they could proceed to the Caribbean, then take the rest of his force to the Philippines via Gibraltar, Port Said, Suez, Socotra, the Laccadive Islands, and Ceylon. After that, he was told to coal either along the coast of Sumatra or in Singapore or Batavia, and then either make an optional stop at Labuan, Borneo, or proceed directly to Mindanao. Once in the Philippines, he was to disperse (to places such as Balabac, Jolo, Basilan, and Zamboanga) or concentrate his squadron as best he saw fit to ensure the safe arrival of the troops. Then he was to find and destroy Dewey's squadron.

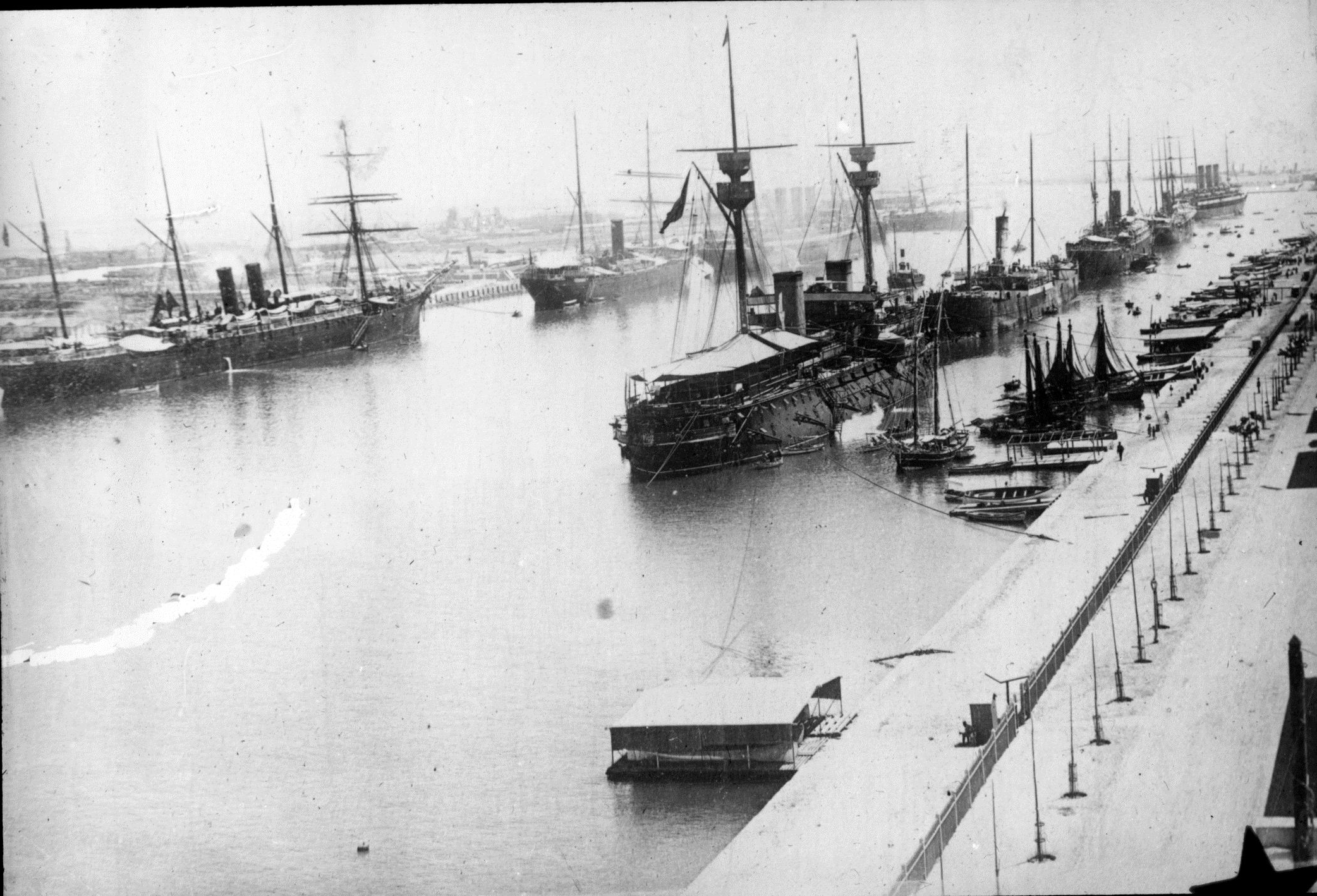
Cámara's squadron in the Suez Canal in July 1898. His flagship, the battleship Pelayo, can be seen in the foreground.

Cámara sortied from Cádiz on 16 June 1898, passed Gibraltar on 17 June (first detaching Alfonso XII and Antonio Lopez for their independent voyages to the Caribbean), and arrived at Port Said on 26 June 1898. There he requested permission to transship coal. However, intelligence operatives in Spain had made the United States aware of Cámara's itinerary, and the U.S. acting vice consul to Egypt in Cairo, diplomat Ethelbert Watts, had acquired a lien on all coal available in Suez. Further complicating matters for Cámara, the British government, which effectively controlled Egypt at the time, informed him on 29 June that his squadron was not permitted to coal in Egyptian waters, on the grounds that it had enough coal to return to Spain and that any coaling activity it undertook in Egypt would violate Egyptian and British neutrality, and that he would have to return to sea within 24 hours. Cámara complied.

On 3 July 1898, Cámara received orders to send Audaz, Osado, and Proserpina back to Spain, and on 4 July the three destroyers detached from his squadron to begin their return voyage. They made a stop at Messina, Sicily, and arrived at Mahón on Menorca in the Balearic Islands on 13 July. Ordered to continue its own voyage, the remainder of Cámara's squadron passed through the Suez Canal on 5–6 July and reached the Red Sea, but also was recalled to Spain on 7 July to defend the Spanish coast after the annihilation of Cervera's squadron in the Caribbean in the Battle of Santiago de Cuba on 3 July. Cámara's squadron returned to Spain on 23 July and was dissolved on 25 July 1898.

The Spanish–American War ended on 12 August 1898 without Cámara, Osado, or any of his other ships seeing combat. The Spanish Navy suffered heavy losses in the conflict, which resulted in the Spanish Empire losing control of Cuba, Puerto Rico, the Philippines, and Guam.

=== 1898–1924 ===
In early November 1898, Osado arrived at Vigo in company with Audaz to coal.

Osado departed Vigo at 10:30 on 7 December 1903 with Emperador Carlos V and the armored cruiser Cardenal Cisneros bound for Lisbon, Portugal, accompanying King Alfonso XIII on his first official visit abroad. The three ships arrived at Lisbon on the morning of 8 December and returned to Ferrol on the morning of 20 December.

Osado and the protected cruiser Lepanto conducted a training cruise in 1905, departing Palma de Mallorca on Mallorca in the Balearic Islands in late May 1905 to carry out exercises in the waters off Ibiza and Cabrera before stopping at Mahón. They then visited Roses, Barcelona, Valencia, Alicante — which they reached on 16 June and where Lepanto ran aground on a sandbank — Santa Pola, and Cartagena.

Osado again accompanied Lepanto on Lepanto′s annual training cruise in 1906, during which they visited several ports in Spain and North Africa. The ships departed Cartagena on 30 April. After passing the Chafarinas Islands, they arrived in Melilla on 6 May 1906. They then called at Ceuta and reached Algeciras on 12 May. After Lepanto embarked the representatives the Sultan of Morocco, Abdelaziz, had sent to the wedding on 31 May of King Alfonso XIII and Princess Victoria Eugenie of Battenberg, the ships returned them to Morocco, arriving at Tangier by mid-June. On 25 June, the ships called at Alicante. In mid-July, they got underway from Barcelona and proceeded to the Gulf of Roses, where they conducted gunnery and torpedo-firing drills. They then steamed to the Balearic Islands before concluding the training voyage at Cartagena in late July.

While serving as a dispatch vessel for the Training Squadron, which served as a home squadron for the Spanish Navy, Osado steamed from Cartagena to Bilbao on the northern coast of Spain early in September 1906. After a voyage from Vigo, she arrived on 1 November 1906 at Málaga, where the squadron gathered to attend a visit by King Alfonso XIII.

In May 1907, Osado conducted a Mediterranean Sea cruise with the Training Squadron, visiting several ports, including a stop at Barcelona on 8 May. In June 1907, she took part in maneuvers off Vigo which also included Pelayo, Proserpina, and other ships. During July and August 1907, she made a cruise in the Bay of Biscay with the Training Squadron. On the afternoon of 30 August 1907, the squadron was at Bilbao for the arrival of the Spanish royal family aboard the royal yacht Giralda. With their crews formed up on deck, Osado, Pelayo, Emperador Carlos V, Proserpina, and the armored cruiser Princesa de Asturias fired salutes as Giralda arrived. The squadron returned to Ferrol during the first week of September.

On 24 September 1907, Osado and Proserpina got underway from Ferrol bound for Cádiz. Around that time, the Spanish Navy established a squadron made up of Osado, Audaz, Proserpina, and their sister ship Terror and gave it the responsibility for maintaining rapid communications between Cádiz and ports on the coast of North Africa. On 20 November 1907, Osado got underway from Cádiz to conduct a patrol along the coast of Morocco.

The Ministry of the Navy renewed Osado′s assignment to the Training Squadron in 1908 along with Pelayo, Emperador Carlos V, Princesa de Asturias, Proserpina, the armored cruiser Cataluña, and the protected cruisers Extremadura and Río de la Plata. She departed Cádiz in January 1908 to patrol the coast of Morocco, visiting Rabat, Larache, and Casablanca before she returned to Cádiz on 29 January. On the morning of June 22, 1908, she got underway from Cádiz to deliver instructions to the coastal defense ship Numancia at Tangier and Emperador Carlos V at Larache.

The Ministry of the Navy again renewed Osado′s assignment to the Training Squadron in 1909 along with Audaz and Terror. Osado, Audaz, and Princesa de Asturias departed San Sebastián at 10:00 on 21 July 1909 bound for Ferrol, and on 22 July Terror and Emperador Carlos V got underway from San Sebastián to rendezvous with them at Ferrol. At Ferrol, the Training Squadron received King Alfonso XIII, who arrived aboard Giralda on 22 July.

The Second Melillan Campaign, which pitted Spanish forces against Riffian tribes in northern Morocco around Melilla, began in July 1909. On 26 July 1909, a violent uprising in Barcelona and other cities in Catalonia that became known as la Semana Trágica (the Tragic Week) broke out due to working-class discontent there over Prime Minister Antonio Maura′s call-up of reserve troops to serve in Morocco. On 29 July, Audaz joined Princesa de Asturias, Emperador Carlos V, Osado, and Proserpina at Barcelona, where the ship's crews joined troops of the Spanish Army in restoring order. On 31 July, the five ships put back to sea to patrol the Moroccan coast.

In the first week of August 1909, Osado arrived at Barcelona after a voyage from Ferrol. On 13 August the ships stationed at Barcelona — Osado, Emperador Carlos V, and Princesa de Asturias — received orders to proceed to Melilla. The three ships got underway from Barcelona on 16 August and stopped at Cádiz, where Audaz and Terror rendezvoused with them. They then proceeded to the war zone off the coast of the Rif region of Morocco and joined other warships in forming a squadron tasked with supporting the operations of Spanish Army forces ashore and to patrol the coast. On 19 August 1909, the squadron was divided into two groups. The first group, under the direct command of the squadron commander, Contralmirante (Counter Admiral) José Morgado y Pita da Veiga, consisted of Osado, Princesa de Asturias, Emperador Carlos V, Numancia, Extremadura, the transport Almirante Lobo, and the torpedo gunboat Vicente Yáñez Pinzón. The second, under the command of the commander of the Cádiz naval station, Contralmirante (Counter Admiral) Enrique Santaló y Sáenz de Tejada, was made up of the gunboats Álvaro de Bazán, Doña María de Molina, General Concha, Hernán Cortés, Marqués de la Victoria, and Ponce de León. Santaló′s group was tasked with patroling the coast of Morocco from Cape Three Forks to Tangier to interdict the smuggling of arms to the Riffians. On the morning of 29 August, Osado and General Concha arrived at Melilla. Osado operated along the coast of Morocco through the end of the Second Melillan Campaign in December 1909.

The Ministry of the Navy renewed Osado′s assignment to the Training Squadron in 1911 along with Audaz, Proserpina, Pelayo, and several cruisers. Osado arrived at Cádiz on 13 April 1911 after a voyage from Barcelona with Extremadura and Audaz, joining the rest of the squadron there. Osado arrived at Cádiz again on 22 August 1911.

On 29 January 1912, Osado departed Cádiz bound for Algeciras in company with Pelayo, Emperador Carlos V, and Audaz. The four ships proceeded on 30 January to Gibraltar, where they were on hand to receive King George V and Queen Mary of the United Kingdom during their return voyage from India. On 9 August 1912, Osado departed Bilbao bound for San Sebastián in company with the torpedo boat No. 41. On the morning of 14 August, Osado and Proserpina were among a number of ships that put to sea from San Sebastián to search Spain's northern coast for the survivors of shipwrecks following a severe storm in the Cantabrian Sea, but both destroyers returned to port without locating any ships in distress or survivors to rescue. On 20 September 1912, the Training Squadron — composed of Osado, Emperador Carlos V, Princesa de Asturias, and Cataluña — departed Ferrol to steam to Cádiz. After stopping there, Osado continued on to Barcelona, which she reached on 29 September. In early November 1912, the Training Squadron — consisting of Osado, Audaz, Emperador Carlos V, Cataluña, and the protected cruiser Reina Regente — arrived at Algeciras.

On 1 May 1913, Osado was among several ships of the Training Squadron that departed from Cádiz bound for Ferrol to attend the launching ceremony for the new battleship Alfonso XIII. Later in 1913, Osado accompanied the Training Squadron on a Mediterranean cruise during which the squadron visited several ports. On 21 December 1913, she got underway from Cartagena and, after a stop at Cádiz, deployed to patrol the North African coast. On 2 October 1913, Osado, Pelayo, Emperador Carlos V, Princesa de Asturias, Extremadura, Reina Regente, Río de la Plata, Audaz, Proserpina, and the dreadnought battleship España were at Cartagena during a meeting there between King Alfonso XIII and President of France Raymond Poincaré aboard Giralda.

Spain remained neutral during World War I (1914–1918), which broke out during the summer of 1914. That summer, Osado patrolled the North African coast. On 9 September 1914, she arrived at Barcelona. After the French steamship Fourquet ran aground at the entrance to the harbor at Mahón on the morning of 17 January 1916, Osado and the steamer Menorquín came to her aid but failed to refloat her because of a severe storm. On the afternoon of 15 September 1917, Osado arrived at Alicante in company with Marqués de la Victoria.

On the morning of 24 April 1919, Osado entered the floating dry dock at Barcelona for maintenance. After completion of the work, she left the dock on 25 May 1919 and moored at Barcelona′s Muralla Wharf. She departed Barcelona at 15:00 on 31 May 1919 and proceeded to Cartagena.

Around 1920, Osado was equipped for minelaying. On the morning of 6 August 1920, she got underway from Cartagena to sink the French steamship Petchi, which was burning off Mazarrón and posing a hazard to navigation. During the remainder of her career, she spent extended periods in reserve. She nearly sank in a storm in 1923.

== Disposal ==
Osado was decommissioned on 1 January 1925. She was scrapped later that year.
