= Spanish destroyer Proserpina =

Spanish Navy destroyer of 1898–1931

History

Spain
- Name: Proserpina
- Namesake: Proserpina, the goddess of spring and wife of Pluto in Roman mythology
- Awarded: 24 November 1896
- Builder: James and George Thomson/ Clydebank Engineering & Shipbuilding Company, Clydebank, Scotland, United Kingdom
- Laid down: 1896 or 1897
- Launched: 23 October 1897
- Commissioned: 8 February 1898
- Decommissioned: May 1931
- Fate: Scrapped 1931

General characteristics
- Class & type: Furor-class destroyer
- Displacement: 400 tons
- Length: 225 ft 0 in (68.58 m)
- Beam: 22 ft 6 in (6.86 m)
- Draft: 5 ft 9 in (1.75 m)
- Installed power: 7,500 ihp (5,600 kW)
- Propulsion: 2-shaft triple expansion, 4 Normand boilers
- Speed: 30 knots (56 km/h; 35 mph)
- Complement: 67 officers and enlisted
- Armament: 2 × 14 pdr quick-firing guns; 8 × 6 pdr quick-firing guns; 2 × 1 pdr Maxim guns, 2 × torpedo tubes
- Notes: 96 tons coal (normal)

Proserpina was a Furor-class destroyer of the Spanish Navy in commission from 1898 to 1931. The longest-serving ship of the class, she served during the Spanish-American War in 1898 and the Second Melillan Campaign in 1909. She was equipped for minelaying around 1920.

== Construction and commissioning ==
In April 1896, the Minister of the Navy, Vicealmirante (Vice Admiral) José María Beránger, presented a new naval program that included the construction of two additional Furor-class destroyers, larger than but with the same armament as the first two ships, Furor and Terror. The two additional destroyers became Audaz and Osado. Spain then expanded its order to include another two Furor-class destroyers of the enlarged design, and these became Plutón and Proserpina, named respectively for Pluto, the Roman god of the underworld, and Proserpina, Pluto's wife and the goddess of spring. The three-funneled ships were, in the parlance of the day, "torpedo boat destroyers," designed to protect larger ships against torpedo boat attack and also carrying torpedoes with which to attack larger ships themselves.

The Spanish government signed the contract for the construction of Plutón and Proserpina with the shipyard of James and George Thomson on 24 November 1896. The Thomson shipyard at Clydebank, Scotland, in the United Kingdom laid the keel of Proserpina in late 1896 or early 1897. The company changed its name to the Clydebank Engineering & Shipbuilding Company in April 1897 and under this name launched her on 23 October 1897 and delivered her to the Spanish Navy on 8 February 1898.

The cost of construction of Plutón and Proserpina combined was about 4,800,000 pesetas. This was about 200,000 pesetas more than the contracted price. Although Plutón was delivered to the Spanish Navy on time, the construction of Audaz, Osado, and Proserpina experienced a delay of eight months. The Spanish government sued the shipyard in the British courts, which finally resulted in a judgment in February 1903 requiring Clydebank Engineering & Shipbuilding to pay the Spanish government 67,500 pounds in damages.

== Service history ==
=== Spanish-American War ===
The United States Navy armored cruiser USS Maine, often referred to as a "battleship," had sunk due to an explosion while anchored in the harbor at Havana, Cuba, on 15 February 1898, and by the time Osado completed her delivery voyage to Spain, anti-Spanish sentiment in the United States had grown to the point that Spain had begun to prepare for war between the two countries. Osado became part of the 2nd Torpedo Boat Squadron, which also included Audaz, Proserpina, and the torpedo boats Halcón, Orión, and Retamosa.

The United States declared war on Spain on 25 April 1898, stipulating that the declaration was retroactive to 21 April. Shortly thereafter, the Spanish Ministry of the Navy ordered warships — Proserpina among them — to concentrate at Cádiz to form the 2nd Squadron under the overall command of Contralmirante (Counter Admiral) Manuel de la Cámara y Livermoore. One mission of the squadron, in the absence of any other direction, was to guard the Spanish coast against raids by the U.S. Navy. While Cámara's squadron lay idle at Cádiz, the U.S. Navy's Asiatic Squadron under Commodore George Dewey destroyed the Spanish Navy's Pacific Squadron under Contralmirante (Counter Admiral) Patricio Montojo y Pasaron in the Philippine Islands in the Battle of Manila Bay on 1 May 1898, and the Spanish Navy's 1st Squadron, under Contralmirante (Counter Admiral) Pascual Cervera y Topete became trapped in the harbor of Santiago de Cuba on the southeastern coast of Cuba on 27 May 1898, blockaded there by the U.S. Navy's Flying Squadron, reinforced by the North Atlantic Squadron on 1 June.

On 15 June 1898, Cámara finally received his orders: He was to depart immediately for the Philippines, escorting a convoy carrying 4,000 Spanish Army troops for reinforcement of the Philippines, and destroy Dewey's squadron there. His orders directed him to depart Cádiz with the battleship Pelayo (Cámara′s flagship); the armored cruiser Emperador Carlos V; the auxiliary cruisers Patriota and Rapido; a destroyer flotilla under the command of Capitán de navío (Ship-of-the-Line Captain) José Ferrándiz y Niño — a future vicealmirante (vice admiral) and minister of the navy — consisting of Audaz (Ferrándiz′s flagship), Osado, and Proserpina; the transports Buenos Aires, Panay, Alfonso XII, and Antonio Lopez; and four colliers carrying 20,000 tons of coal. He was to detach Alfonso XII and Antonio Lopez near Gibraltar after dark so that they could proceed to the Caribbean, then take the rest of his force to the Philippines via Gibraltar, Port Said, Suez, Socotra, the Laccadive Islands, and Ceylon. After that, he was told to coal either along the coast of Sumatra or in Singapore or Batavia, and then either make an optional stop at Labuan, Borneo, or proceed directly to Mindanao. Once in the Philippines, he was to disperse (to places such as Balabac, Jolo, Basilan, and Zamboanga) or concentrate his squadron as best he saw fit to ensure the safe arrival of the troops. Then he was to find and destroy Dewey's squadron.

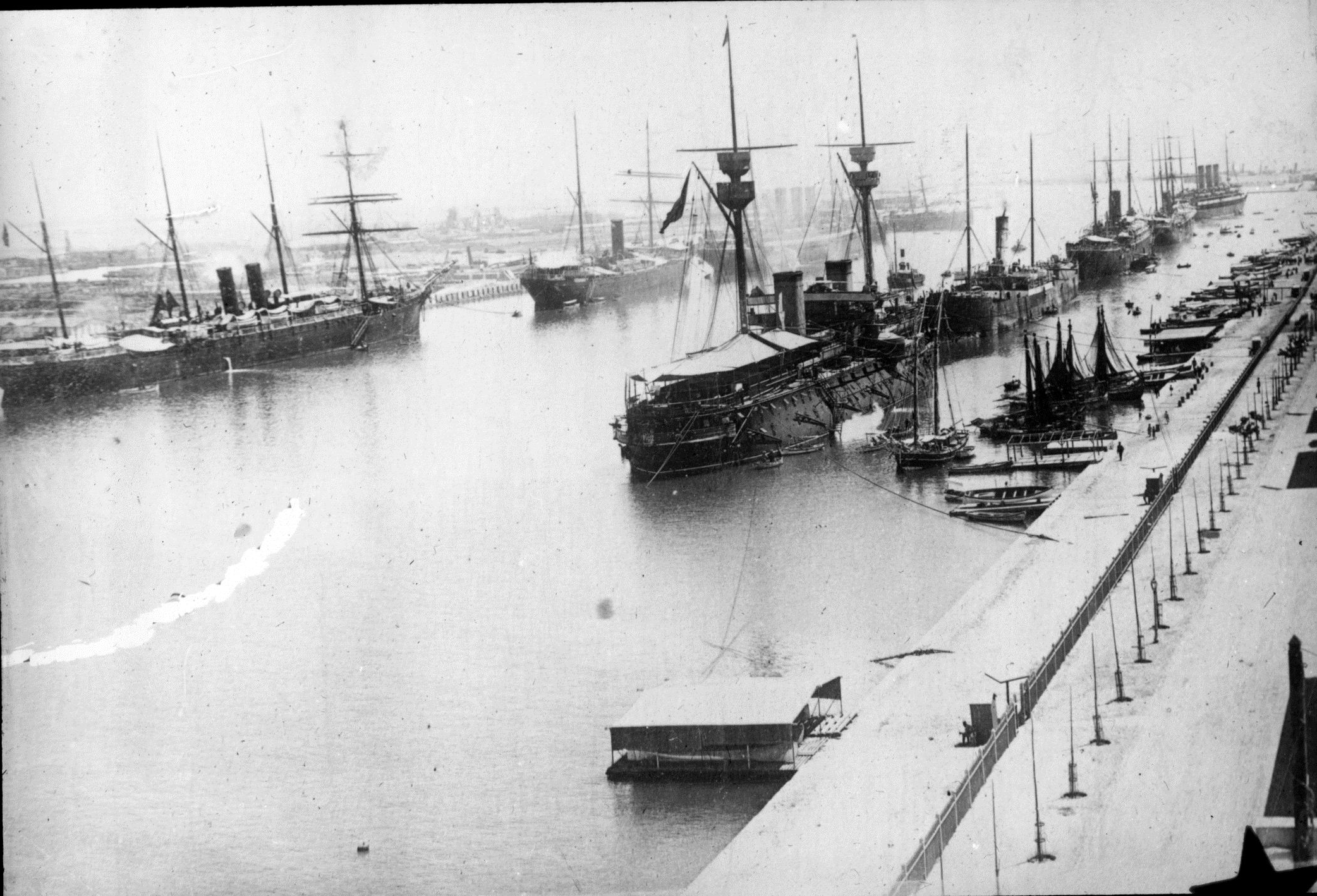
Cámara's squadron in the Suez Canal in July 1898. His flagship, the battleship Pelayo, can be seen in the foreground.

Cámara sortied from Cádiz on 16 June 1898, passed Gibraltar on 17 June (first detaching Alfonso XII and Antonio Lopez for their independent voyages to the Caribbean), and arrived at Port Said on 26 June 1898. There he requested permission to transship coal. However, intelligence operatives in Spain had made the United States aware of Cámara's itinerary, and the U.S. acting vice consul to Egypt in Cairo, diplomat Ethelbert Watts, had acquired a lien on all coal available in Suez. Further complicating matters for Cámara, the British government, which effectively controlled Egypt at the time, informed him on 29 June that his squadron was not permitted to coal in Egyptian waters, on the grounds that it had enough coal to return to Spain and that any coaling activity it undertook in Egypt would violate Egyptian and British neutrality, and that he would have to return to sea within 24 hours. Cámara complied.

On 3 July 1898, Cámara received orders to send Audaz, Osado, and Proserpina back to Spain, and on 4 July the three destroyers detached from his squadron to begin their return voyage. They made a stop at Messina, Sicily, and arrived at Mahón on Menorca in the Balearic Islands on 13 July. Ordered to continue its own voyage, the remainder of Cámara's squadron passed through the Suez Canal on 5–6 July and reached the Red Sea, but also was recalled to Spain on 7 July to defend the Spanish coast after the annihilation of Cervera's squadron in the Caribbean in the Battle of Santiago de Cuba on 3 July. Cámara's squadron returned to Spain on 23 July and was dissolved on 25 July 1898.

The Spanish–American War ended on 12 August 1898 without Cámara, Proserpina, or any of his other ships seeing combat. The Spanish Navy suffered heavy losses in the conflict, which resulted in the Spanish Empire losing control of Cuba, Puerto Rico, the Philippines, and Guam.

=== 1899–1931 ===
During the second week of March 1902, Proserpina tested her engines off Cádiz in preparation for maneuvers with other ships of the Spanish fleet.

On the morning of 21 November 1906, Pelayo, the unprotected cruiser Infanta Isabel, and the gunboat Doña María de Molina departed Cádiz, transporting a battalion of Spanish Marine Infantry to Tangier. Proserpina escorted them on the voyage. While Proserpina was testing her engines off Cádiz in late December 1906 after she had undergone repairs at the shipyard at the Arsenal de La Carraca in San Fernando, a fire broke out in her boilers, forcing her to return to port and re-enter the shipyard for additional repairs.

While at Ferrol on 25 March 1907, the armored cruiser Princesa de Asturias received orders to proceed to Cartagena accompanied by the protected cruiser Extremadura, royal yacht Giralda, and Proserpina. They were among a number of ships that attended a meeting between King Alfonso XIII and King Edward VII of the United Kingdom which took place in Cartagena's harbor from 8 to 10 April 1907.

In May 1907, Proserpina made a cruise in the Mediterranean Sea with the Training Squadron, which also included Emperador Carlos V, Princesa de Asturias, Extremadura, and Osado. The cruise's itinerary included several ports, with a stop at Barcelona on 8 May. A division composed of Princesa de Asturias, Extremadura, the protected cruiser Río de la Plata, and two torpedo boats, arrived at Villagarcía de Arosa on 20 June 1907 and in the following days carried out maneuvers off Vigo with Pelayo, Osado, and Proserpina off the coast of Galicia.

During July and August 1907, Proserpina made a cruise in the Bay of Biscay with the Training Squadron. On the afternoon of 30 August 1907, the squadron was at Bilbao for the arrival of the Spanish royal family aboard Giralda. With their crews formed up on deck, Proserpina, Pelayo, Emperador Carlos V, Princesa de Asturias and Osado fired salutes as Giralda arrived. The squadron returned to Ferrol during the first week of September.

On 24 September 1907, Proserpina and Osado got underway from Ferrol bound for Cádiz. Around that time, the Spanish Navy established a squadron made up of Proserpina, Audaz, Osado, and their sister ship Terror and gave it the responsibility for maintaining rapid communications between Cádiz and ports on the coast of North Africa.

The Ministry of the Navy renewed Proserpina′s assignment to the Training Squadron in 1908 along with Pelayo, Emperador Carlos V, Princesa de Asturias, Extremadura, Río de la Plata, Osado, and the armored cruiser Cataluña. Proserpina got underway from Cádiz on 22 January 1908 bound for Rabat on the coast of Morocco, where she replaced Princesa de Asturias on station there.

The Second Melillan Campaign, which pitted Spanish forces against Riffian tribes in northern Morocco around Melilla, began in July 1909. On 26 July 1909, a violent uprising in Barcelona and other cities in Catalonia that became known as la Semana Trágica (the Tragic Week) broke out due to working-class discontent there over Prime Minister Antonio Maura′s call-up of reserve troops to serve in Morocco. On 29 July, Proserpina, Princesa de Asturias, Emperador Carlos V, Audaz, and Osado gathered at Barcelona, where the ship's crews joined troops of the Spanish Army in restoring order. On 31 July, the five ships put back to sea to patrol the Moroccan coast.

The Ministry of the Navy renewed Proserpina′s assignment to the Training Squadron in 1911 along with Audaz, Osado, Pelayo, and several cruisers. On the morning of 14 August 1913, Proserpina and Osado were among a number of ships that put to sea from San Sebastián to search Spain's northern coast for the survivors of shipwrecks following a severe storm in the Cantabrian Sea, but both destroyers returned to port without locating any ships in distress or survivors to rescue.

On 2 October 1913, Proserpina, Pelayo, Emperador Carlos V, Princesa de Asturias, Extremadura, Río de la Plata, Audaz, Osado, the dreadnought battleship España, and the protected cruiser Reina Regente were at Cartagena during a meeting there between King Alfonso XIII and President of France Raymond Poincaré aboard Giralda. The entire squadron also attended the presentation ceremony for España′s battle flag on 11 October. After the ceremony, Proserpina, Pelayo, Princesa de Asturias, Extremadura, Reina Regente, Río de la Plata, Audaz, and Osado deployed to patrol the coast of Morocco. On 26 December 1913, Proserpina, Pelayo, Extremadura, and the gunboat Lauria guarded a British ship that had run aground off Ceuta to prevent attacks on it by Riffian forces.

Spain remained neutral during World War I (1914–1918), and the following years passed largely uneventfully for Proserpina. She underwent modernization in 1916. On 22 August 1919, the submarines Isaac Peral (A-0), Narcíso Monturiol (A-1), Cosme García (A-2), and A-3 put to sea from Santander under escort by Proserpina and the destroyer Bustamante to conduct maneuvers off Cabo Mayor during the day with King Alfonso XIII aboard Narciso Monturiol.

Around 1920, Proserpina was equipped for minelaying. She spent long periods in reserve during her later years.

== Disposal ==
The longest-serving Furor-class destroyer, Proserpina was the last to be decommissioned when she was retired in May 1931. She was scrapped later that year.
