= Spanish destroyer Audaz (1897) =

Spanish Navy destroyer of 1898–1924

History

Spain
- Name: Audaz
- Namesake: Audacious
- Awarded: 4 June 1896
- Builder: James and George Thomson/ Clydebank Engineering & Shipbuilding Company, Clydebank, Scotland, United Kingdom
- Laid down: 6 June 1896
- Launched: 6 February 1897
- Commissioned: 8 March 1898
- Decommissioned: 6 June 1924
- Fate: Scrapped 1925

General characteristics
- Class & type: Furor-class destroyer
- Displacement: 400 tons
- Length: 225 ft 0 in (68.58 m)
- Beam: 22 ft 6 in (6.86 m)
- Draft: 5 ft 9 in (1.75 m)
- Installed power: 7,500 ihp (5,600 kW)
- Propulsion: 2-shaft triple expansion, 4 Normand boilers
- Speed: 30 knots (56 km/h; 35 mph)
- Complement: 67 officers and enlisted
- Armament: 2 × 14 pdr quick-firing guns; 8 × 6 pdr quick-firing guns; 2 × 1 pdr Maxim guns, 2 × torpedo tubes
- Notes: 96 tons coal (normal)

Audaz ("Audacious") was a Furor-class destroyer of the Spanish Navy in commission from 1898 to 1924. She served during the Spanish-American War in 1898 and the Second Melillan Campaign in 1909 and participated in bombardment operations along the coast of Spanish Morocco in 1913. She was equipped for minelaying around 1920.

== Construction and commissioning ==
In April 1896, the Minister of the Navy, Vicealmirante (Vice Admiral) José María Beránger, presented a new naval program that included the construction of two additional Furor-class destroyers, larger than but with the same armament as the first two ships, Furor and Terror. The two additional destroyers became Audaz and Osado. Spain later expanded its order to include another two Furor-class destroyers of the enlarged design, and these became Plutón and Proserpina. The three-funnelled ships were, in the parlance of the day, "torpedo boat destroyers," designed to protect larger ships against torpedo boat attack and also carrying torpedoes with which to attack larger ships themselves.

The Spanish government signed the contract for the construction of Audaz and Osado with the shipyard of James and George Thomson on 4 June 1896. The Thomson shipyard at Clydebank, Scotland, in the United Kingdom laid the keel of Audaz on 6 June 1896 and launched her on 6 February 1897. (Note: The historical database Todoavante presents an internal chronological error regarding this dates, stating that Audaz was launched on 1 March 1898 and officially delivered to the Spanish Navy on 8 March 1898, indicating an impossibly short fitting-out period of only one week. Contemporary shipbuilding registries and official U.S. Office of Naval Intelligence logs from 1897 clarify that the vessel was actually launched over a year prior, on 6 February 1897, providing a thirteen-month window for fitting-out and machinery trials before her March 1898 commissioning.) The company changed its name to the Clydebank Engineering & Shipbuilding Company in April 1897 and under this name delivered her to the Spanish Navy on 8 March 1898.

Audaz′s construction cost was just over 2,000,000 pesetas. Although Plutón was delivered to the Spanish Navy on time, the construction of Audaz, Osado, and Proserpina experienced a delay of eight months. The Spanish government sued the shipyard in the British courts, which finally resulted in a judgment in February 1903 requiring Clydebank Engineering & Shipbuilding to pay the Spanish government 67,500 pounds in damages.

== Service history ==
=== Delivery voyage ===
Soon after commissioning, Audaz began her delivery voyage from the United Kingdom to Spain. During the voyage, she encountered a severe storm on 24 March 1898 which bent and badly damaged her bow and almost sank her. She sought refuge in Waterford Harbour on the southeastern coast of Ireland. After temporary repairs at Waterford, she got back underway and reached Spain, arriving at Ferrol. She became part of the 2nd Torpedo Boat Squadron, which also included Osado, Proserpina, and the torpedo boats Halcón, Orión, and Retamosa.

=== Spanish-American War ===
The United States Navy armored cruiser USS Maine, often referred to as a "battleship," had sunk due to an explosion while anchored in the harbor at Havana, Cuba, on 15 February 1898, and by the time Audaz arrived in Spain anti-Spanish sentiment in the United States had grown to the point that Spain had begun to prepare for war between the two countries. The United States declared war on Spain on 25 April 1898, stipulating that the declaration was retroactive to 21 April. Shortly thereafter, the Spanish Ministry of the Navy ordered warships — Audaz among them — to concentrate at Cádiz to form the 2nd Squadron under the overall command of Contralmirante (Counter Admiral) Manuel de la Cámara y Livermoore. One mission of the squadron, in the absence of any other direction, was to guard the Spanish coast against raids by the U.S. Navy. While Cámara's squadron lay idle at Cádiz, the U.S. Navy's Asiatic Squadron under Commodore George Dewey destroyed the Spanish Navy's Pacific Squadron under Contralmirante (Counter Admiral) Patricio Montojo y Pasaron in the Philippine Islands in the Battle of Manila Bay on 1 May 1898, and the Spanish Navy's 1st Squadron, under Contralmirante (Counter Admiral) Pascual Cervera y Topete became trapped in the harbor of Santiago de Cuba on the southeastern coast of Cuba on 27 May 1898, blockaded there by the U.S. Navy's Flying Squadron, reinforced by the North Atlantic Squadron on 1 June.

On 15 June 1898, Cámara finally received his orders: He was to depart immediately for the Philippines, escorting a convoy carrying 4,000 Spanish Army troops for reinforcement of the Philippines, and destroy Dewey's squadron there. His orders directed him to depart Cádiz with the battleship Pelayo (Cámara′s flagship); the armored cruiser Emperador Carlos V; the auxiliary cruisers Patriota and Rapido; a destroyer flotilla under the command of Capitán de navío (Ship-of-the-Line Captain) José Ferrándiz y Niño — a future vicealmirante (vice admiral) and minister of the navy — consisting of Audaz (Ferrándiz′s flagship), Osado, and Proserpina; the transports Buenos Aires, Panay, Alfonso XII, and Antonio Lopez; and four colliers carrying 20,000 tons of coal. He was to detach Alfonso XII and Antonio Lopez near Gibraltar after dark so that they could proceed to the Caribbean, then take the rest of his force to the Philippines via Gibraltar, Port Said, Suez, Socotra, the Laccadive Islands, and Ceylon. After that, he was told to coal either along the coast of Sumatra or in Singapore or Batavia, and then either make an optional stop at Labuan, Borneo, or proceed directly to Mindanao. Once in the Philippines, he was to disperse (to places such as Balabac, Jolo, Basilan, and Zamboanga) or concentrate his squadron as best he saw fit to ensure the safe arrival of the troops. Then he was to find and destroy Dewey's squadron.

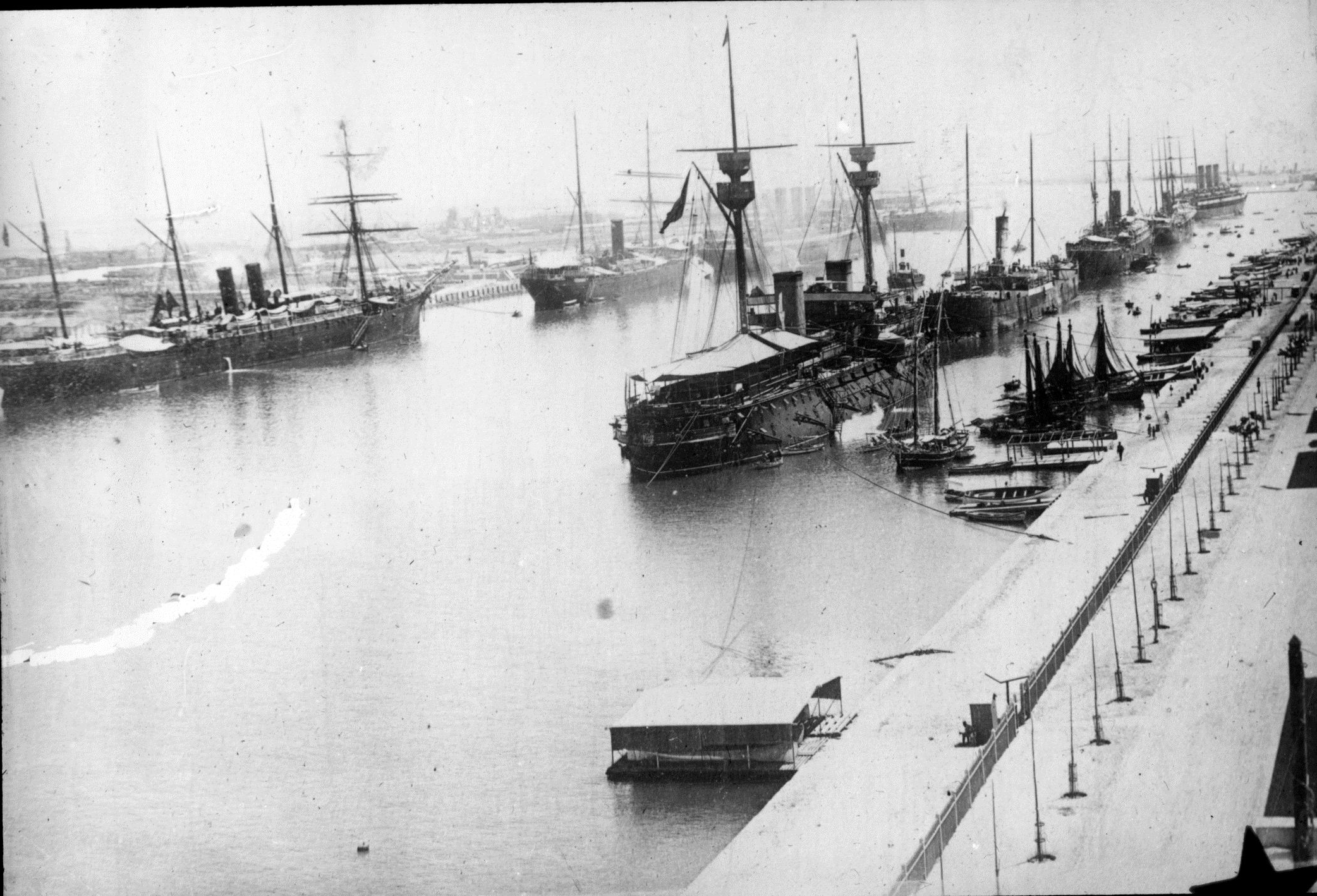
Cámara's squadron in the Suez Canal in July 1898. His flagship, the battleship Pelayo, can be seen in the foreground.

Cámara sortied from Cádiz on 16 June 1898, passed Gibraltar on 17 June (first detaching Alfonso XII and Antonio Lopez for their independent voyages to the Caribbean), and arrived at Port Said on 26 June 1898. There he requested permission to transship coal. However, intelligence operatives in Spain had made the United States aware of Cámara's itinerary, and the U.S. acting vice consul to Egypt in Cairo, diplomat Ethelbert Watts, had acquired a lien on all coal available in Suez. Further complicating matters for Cámara, the British government, which effectively controlled Egypt at the time, informed him on 29 June that his squadron was not permitted to coal in Egyptian waters, on the grounds that it had enough coal to return to Spain and that any coaling activity it undertook in Egypt would violate Egyptian and British neutrality, and that he would have to return to sea within 24 hours. Cámara complied.

On 3 July 1898, Cámara received orders to send Audaz, Osado, and Proserpina back to Spain, and on 4 July the three destroyers detached from his squadron to begin their return voyage. They made a stop at Messina, Sicily, and arrived at Mahón on Menorca in the Balearic Islands on 13 July. Ordered to continue its own voyage, the remainder of Cámara's squadron passed through the Suez Canal on 5–6 July and reached the Red Sea, but also was recalled to Spain on 7 July to defend the Spanish coast after the annihilation of Cervera's squadron in the Caribbean in the Battle of Santiago de Cuba on 3 July. Cámara's squadron returned to Spain on 23 July and was dissolved on 25 July 1898.

The Spanish–American War ended on 12 August 1898 without Cámara, Audaz, or any of his other ships seeing combat. The Spanish Navy suffered heavy losses in the conflict, which resulted in the Spanish Empire losing control of Cuba, Puerto Rico, the Philippines, and Guam.

=== 1898–1924 ===
In early November 1898, Osado arrived at Vigo in company with Audaz to coal.

The Training Squadron, which served as a home squadron for the Spanish Navy and included Pelayo, Emperador Carlos V, the armored cruisers Cardenal Cisneros and Princesa de Asturias, the protected cruiser Extremadura, and the coastal defense ship Numancia got underway from the Balearic Islands on 13 June 1903 and proceeded to Cartagena, Spain. Steaming from Ferrol, Audaz joined it there. The ships attended a visit to the city by King Alfonso XIII on 22 June. The French Navy's Mediterranean Squadron and a British Royal Navy squadron from Gibraltar also were present.

In the autumn of 1907, the Spanish Navy established a squadron made up of Audaz, Osado, Proserpina, and their sister ship Terror and gave it the responsibility for maintaining rapid communications between Cádiz and ports on the coast of North Africa.

Audaz departed Cádiz in company with Emperador Carlos V and Princesa de Asturias on 16 October 1908 bound for Barcelona, which the ships reached on 18 October. Audaz moored in the inner harbor, and more ships of the squadron arrived in the following days. The squadron remained in port for a visit by King Alfonso XIII. Audaz departed Barcelona on 8 November 1908 in company with Emperador Carlos V, Princesa de Asturias, and the armored cruiser Cataluña bound for Cartagena, where she arrived on the morning of the 11 November, ahead of the other ships. In early December 1908, she left Cartagena in company with Princesa de Asturias bound for Cádiz, which they reached on 4 December. Then then stopped at Vigo before setting out for Ferrol. Rough seas which caused Audaz to roll so heavily that her commanding officer fell and fractured his arm forced her to put into port at Villagarcía de Arosa to await better weather. She finally reached Ferrol after the seas moderated.

Audaz, Osado, and Terror were assigned to the Training Squadron in 1909. Audaz, Osado and Princesa de Asturias departed San Sebastián at 10:00 on 21 July 1909 bound for Ferrol, and on 21 July Terror and Emperador Carlos V got underway from San Sebastián to rendezvous with them at Ferrol. At Ferrol, the Training Squadron received King Alfonso XIII, who arrived aboard the royal yacht Giralda on 22 July.

The Second Melillan Campaign, which pitted Spanish forces against Riffian tribes in northern Morocco around Melilla, began in July 1909. That summer Audaz was integrated into the North African Naval Forces Group and began operating off North Africa in support of Spanish forces fighting in the campaign as part of a squadron that patrolled the coast to prevent smuggling and defend coastal ship traffic from attacks by the Riffians. On 26 July 1909, she steamed from Tangier to Larache, Morocco, following orders from the Spanish Minister Plenipotentiary in Tangier, Alfonso Merry del Val. That day, however, a violent uprising in Barcelona and other cities in Catalonia that became known as la Semana Trágica (the Tragic Week) broke out due to working-class discontent there over Prime Minister Antonio Maura′s call-up of reserve troops to serve in Morocco On 29 July, Audaz joined Princesa de Asturias, Emperador Carlos V, Osado, and Proserpina at Barcelona, where the ship's crews joined troops of the Spanish Army in restoring order. On 31 July, the ships headed back to North Africa to patrol the Moroccan coast. By early September 1909, the squadron operating off Morocco included Audaz, Terror, the first-class gunboats Álvaro de Bazán, Doña María de Molina, and Marqués de la Victoria, and the second-class gunboats Hernán Cortés, Ponce de León, and Vasco Núñez de Balboa.

The Second Melillan Campaign concluded in December 1909, but Audaz continued frequent patrols off Morocco during 1910. When King Alfonso XIII visited Melilla on 8 January 1911 aboard Giralda, his escort included Audaz, Terror, Cataluña, Princesa de Asturias, Extremadura, Numancia, Álvaro de Bazán, the protected cruiser Río de la Plata, and the transport Almirante Lobo. Late in April 1911, a French intervention in Morocco took place, leading to the Agadir Crisis between France and the German Empire, which began in July 1911. Anticipating a crisis when the French intervened, the Spanish Ministry of the Navy ordered the Training Squadron to concentrate at Cádiz, and Audaz, Emperador Carlos V, Princesa de Asturias, Cataluña, Extremadura, Río de la Plata, Álvaro de Bazán, Doña María de Molina, Almirante Lobo, the protected cruiser Reina Regente, and the unprotected cruiser Infanta Isabel gathered there along with a large number of Spanish Marine Infantry troops. The force conducted various amphibious landing exercises in the following days. On the morning of 6 July, Audaz embarked Coronel (Colonel) Manuel Fernández Silvestre — a future general de división (divisional general) — at Tangier to transport him to Cádiz so that he could make his way to Madrid to provide a report to the Spanish government on the situation in Tangier.

On 29 January 1912, Audaz departed Cádiz bound for Algeciras in company with Pelayo, Emperador Carlos V, and Osado. The four ships proceeded on 30 January to Gibraltar, where they were on hand to receive King George V and Queen Mary of the United Kingdom during their return voyage from India.

In 1913, Audaz took part in bombardments of Spanish Morocco's Rif coast. In October 1913, Audaz, Pelayo, Emperador Carlos V, Princesa de Asturias, Extremadura, Reina Regente, Río de la Plata, Osado, Proserpina, and the dreadnought battleship España were at Cartagena during a meeting there between King Alfonso XIII and President of France Raymond Poincaré aboard the royal yacht Giralda.

Around 1920, Audaz was equipped for minelaying.

In September 1921, the new Spanish submarine squadron visited Barcelona for a week to allow Minister of the Navy José Gómez Acedo and the chief of the naval staff, Vicealmirante (Vice Admiral) Salvador Buhigas, to review the Spanish Navy's submarine and torpedo boat flotillas and demonstrate for them the navy's newest acquisitions. The submarine rescue ship Kanguro arrived at Barcelona on the afternoon of 12 September 1921, followed by the submarines Isaac Peral, Narciso Monturiol, Cosme García, and A-3 and then by the torpedo boats No. 1, No. 5, No. 21, and No. 22. There to meet them were Audaz, Río de la Plata, and Almirante Lobo. What followed over the next week were the Spanish Navy's first sea-and-air exercises. On the morning of 19 September — the final day of the exercises — Kanguro weighed anchor and led the submarine squadron out of the harbor, followed by the submarines and then the torpedo boats. Audaz and Almirante Lobo accompanied them. With Gómez Acedo and Buhigas embarked on Narciso Monturiol, the vessels conducted diving maneuvers and antisubmarine warfare exercises with naval aircraft. The activities concluded later in the morning, and Gómez Acedo and Buhigas transferred from Narciso Monturiol to Audaz and then to Río de la Plata.

In January 1922, Audaz was assigned to duty as an auxiliary and support ship for the newly created Naval Aeronautics Division. She served in this capacity until January 1924, when she steamed to Cartagena for decommissioning.

== Disposal ==
Audaz was decommissioned on 6 June 1924. She was scrapped in 1925.
