= Furor-class destroyer =

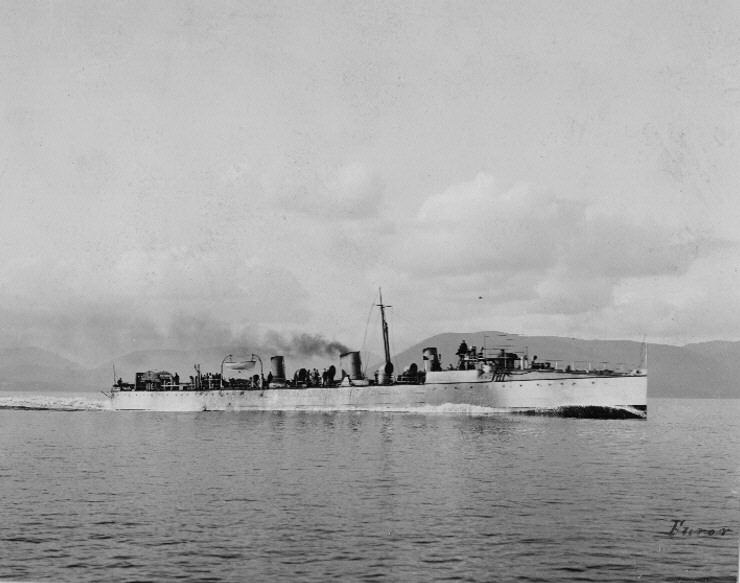
- Furor running builder's trials in British waters in 1896.

Class overview
- Operators: Spanish Navy
- Preceded by: Destructor
- Succeeded by: Bustamante class
- In commission: 1896–1931
- Completed: 6
- Lost: 2
- Retired: 4

General characteristics
- Type: Destroyer
- Displacement: 380 tons
- Length: 69.8 m (229 ft 0 in)
- Beam: 6.8 m (22 ft 4 in)
- Draft: 4 m (13 ft 1 in)
- Installed power: 7,000 hp (5,220 kW)
- Propulsion: 4 Normand boilers, 2 triple-expansion engines, 2 shafts
- Speed: 28 knots (52 km/h; 32 mph)
- Complement: 65
- Armament: Design; 2 × 75 mm (3 in) mm Nordenfelt cannon; 2 × 57 mm (2.2 in) mm Nordenfelt cannon; 2 × Maxim machine guns; 2 × 356 mm (14 in) torpedo tubes

The Furor class was a type of destroyers of the Spanish Navy, similar to the units of the A class, or 27 knotters, of the British Royal Navy. Commissioned in 1896 by the then Minister of the Navy Admiral Beranger after the success of the design by Fernando Villaamil of the warship Destructor, which had given name to a whole typology of vessels.

== Description ==
Although of the same series, there were differences in size, armament, and machinery between the six Furor-class destroyers. The first two (Furor and Terror) are sometimes considered a subseries. They were considered sleek and elegant ships for the time, able to use their speed (28 knots (52 km/h; 32 mph)) to hunt any contemporary torpedo boat. The Furor class' main function was to serve as escort to the larger capital ships and protect them against the torpedo boats, while also hunting the latter.

The construction of the six ships that were manufactured were ordered from the shipyards of J & G Thompson of Clydebank (Scotland), being praised in its design by the Royal Navy.

=== Armament ===
The Furor class were vessels that, despite their small size of only 380 tons, had a strong armament. For the main armament the ships were equipped with two semi-automatic 75 mm (3 in) Nordenfelt guns, one forward on the bow and another to aft, and two Nordenfelt 57 mm (2.2 in) cannon one on each side amidships. Secondary armament consisted of two automatic 37 mm (1.5 in) Maxim machine guns with a similar placement, as well as two 356 mm (14 in) torpedo tubes.

=== Armor ===
Armor on the Furor-class ships was non-existent, and although the hull was made of steel, any impact of a medium caliber could (and indeed did in the Battle of Santiago de Cuba) leave them out of action.

== History ==
These ships had their baptism of fire in the Battle of Santiago de Cuba, where despite the efforts of Capitán de navío (Ship-of-the-Line Captain) Fernando Villaamil were incorrectly used. Furor and Plutón were present at the battle while Terror had suffered damage prior to arriving at Cuba and had into port at Puerto Rico.

After the Spanish–American War began, the United States Navy blockaded the Spanish ships in at Santiago de Cuba and expected a favorable outcome through the use of ground forces which would allow the entire Spanish fleet to be captured intact. To this end the American fleet tried blocking the entrance to the bay of Santiago by sinking the old collier Merrimack, but was intercepted by the unprotected cruiser Reina Mercedes and Plutón, who managed to sink it before it blocked the channel. The Spanish fleet was outnumbered and outgunned by the encroaching American fleet and would have to try to run through the gauntlet of American ships to escape. Captain Villaamil, in charge of both Furor and Plutón, proposed to launch a surprise night attack with torpedoes but was overruled by the squadron commander, Contralmirante (Counter Admiral) Pascual Cervera y Topete.

On the morning of 3 July 1898, the Spanish squadron — the armored cruisers Almirante Oquendo, Infanta Maria Teresa, and Vizcaya, with Furor, and Plutón — attempted to run the blockade and escape from Cuba. Charging against a clearly superior force, in which there were three battleships, an armored cruiser, and two protected cruisers, the fleet suffered major damage in a short period. With the limited artillery aboard Pluton and Furor they could do little against the enemy. Meanwhile, Pluton was run aground at 10:45 near Cabanas Bay. Furor sank quickly at 10:50 with Villaamil aboard. His body was never recovered. The two destroyers lost two-thirds of their crews.

Terror was repaired on 12 June 1898, at the port of San Juan, Puerto Rico. The port at the time was being blockaded by the U.S. auxiliary cruiser USS Saint Paul. On June 22, 1898, Terror made an exit along with the unprotected cruiser Isabel II with the intention of attacking the American ship. When Terror was at an optimal distance for a torpedo attack, she suffered a direct impact from an artillery shell which, although it did not explode, breached the ship's hull, forcing her to retreat, protected by the gunfire of Isabel II.

== Ships of the class ==
The Furor class consisted of six ships.

Name	Laid down	Launched	Commissioned	Decommissioned	Fate	Comment
Furor	21 February 1896	7 August 1896	16 December 1896	—	Sunk 3 July 1898 in Battle of Santiago de Cuba	
Terror	1 November 1895	10 August 1896	17 December 1896	30 October 1924	Scrapped 1924	
Audaz	6 June 1896	6 February 1897	8 March 1898	6 June 1924	Scrapped 1925	
Osado	1896	6 May 1897	8 March 1898	1 January 1925	Scrapped 1925	
Plutón	12 February 1897	13 July 1897	29 December 1897	—	Sunk 3 July 1898 in Battle of Santiago de Cuba	
Proserpina	1896 or 1897	23 October 1897	8 February 1898	May 1931	Scrapped 1931	
