= Spanish destroyer Furor (1896) =

Spanish Navy destroyer of 1896–1898

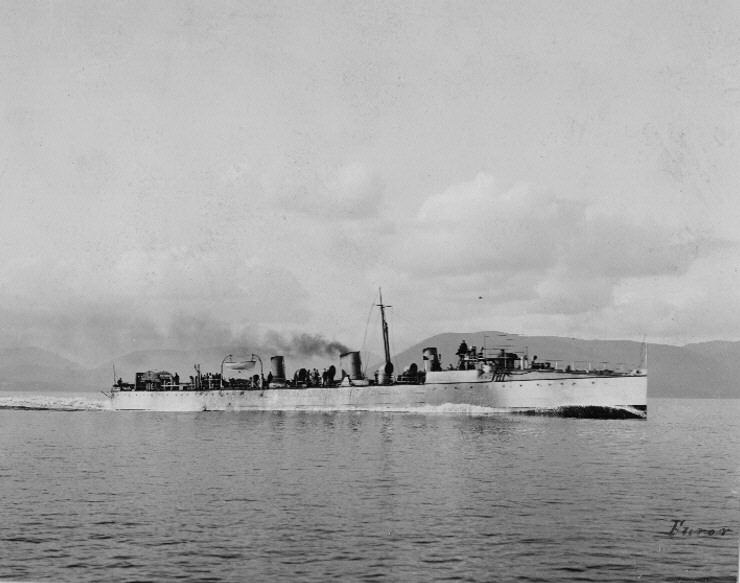
- Furor on builder's trials in the United Kingdom ca. 1896

History

Spain
- Name: Furor
- Namesake: Spanish word for "fury"
- Ordered: 15 April 1895 (authorized)
- Awarded: 23 December 1895
- Builder: James and George Thomson, Clydebank, Scotland, United Kingdom
- Laid down: 21 February 1896
- Launched: 7 August 1896
- Completed: 21 November 1896
- Commissioned: 16 December 1896
- Fate: Sunk 3 July 1898

General characteristics
- Class & type: Furor-class destroyer
- Displacement: 370 tons
- Length: 220 ft 0 in (67.06 m)
- Beam: 22 ft 0 in (6.71 m)
- Draft: 5 ft 6 in (1.68 m)
- Installed power: 6,000 ihp (4,474 kW)
- Propulsion: 4-cylinder triple expansion engines, 2 shafts, 4 Normand boilers
- Speed: 28 knots (52 km/h; 32 mph)
- Complement: 67
- Armament: 2 × 14 pdr 75 mm (3 in) quick-firing guns; 8 × 6 pdr 57 mm (2.2 in) quick-firing guns; 2 × 1 pdr pom-pom Maxim quick-firing guns; 2 × torpedo tubes
- Notes: 100 tons coal (normal)

Furor was a Furor-class destroyer of the Spanish Navy. Commissioned in 1896, she was sunk in 1898 in the Battle of Santiago de Cuba during the Spanish–American War.

== Construction and commissioning ==
The Spanish government authorized the construction of the first two Furor-class destroyers — three-funnelled "torpedo boat destroyers" in the parlance of the day, designed to protect larger ships against torpedo boat attack, but also carrying torpedoes with which to attack larger ships themselves — on 15 April 1895, and the Minister of the Navy, Vicealmirante (Vice Admiral) José María Beránger, signed the formal contract with the shipyard of James and George Thomson on 23 December 1895. Furor′s keel was laid on 21 February 1896, she was launched on 7 August 1896, and she was completed on 21 November 1896. (Note: The historical database Todoavante presents a chronological contradiction, stating the contract was signed on 23 December 1895 but claiming the keels were laid down earlier, on 1 November 1895. British shipyard logs and standard naval reference texts resolve this by confirming that actual construction on the slipways began when Furor′s keel was laid on 21 February 1896.) She was commissioned on 16 December 1896.

== Operational history ==
=== 1897 ===
A view of Furor from astern.

Furor and her sister ship Terror — ordered under the same contract — departed Falmouth, Cornwall, on their delivery voyage to Spain on 27 January 1897. Furor and Terror operated in the Mediterranean Sea, then arrived at Cádiz in July 1897 to have their hulls cleaned. Upon completion of the work, the two destroyers joined the Training Squadron, then under the command of Contralmirante (Counter Admiral) Segismundo Bermejo y Merelo. After several incidents off the coast of Morocco in late August 1897, the Spanish Navy sent the gunboat Cuervo to patrol the area, followed later by Furor.

Appointed to serve as Minister of the Navy, Bermejo relinquished command of the Training Squadron, and Contralmirante (Counter Admiral) Pascual Cervera y Topete took command on 30 October 1897. Under Cervera, the squadron's heavy ships — the armored cruisers Almirante Oquendo, Infanta Maria Teresa, Vizcaya, and Cristóbal Colón — departed Cádiz on 27 November 1897 to carry out maneuvers off Santa Pola, leaving Furor, Terror, and the warship Destructor — a fast torpedo gunboat often considered the world's first destroyer — behind to have their hulls cleaned. When that work was done, Furor, Terror, and Destructor departed Cádiz and called at Málaga from 10 to 12 December before proceeding to Santa Pola to join the maneuvers. The maneuvers — limited by Minister of the Navy Bermejo's advice that Cervera conserve fuel and ammunition — focused on crew training and testing of the ships' guns, although the armored cruisers were permitted to fire only two rounds from each of their large-caliber guns. Furor, Terror, Destructor, and the torpedo boats Ariete, Azor, and Rayo joined together for several exercises during the maneuvers, including mock night attacks on the armored cruisers. The maneuvers wrapped up on 22 December 1897, and the squadron called at Alicante on 23 December and arrived at Cartagena on 28 December 1897.

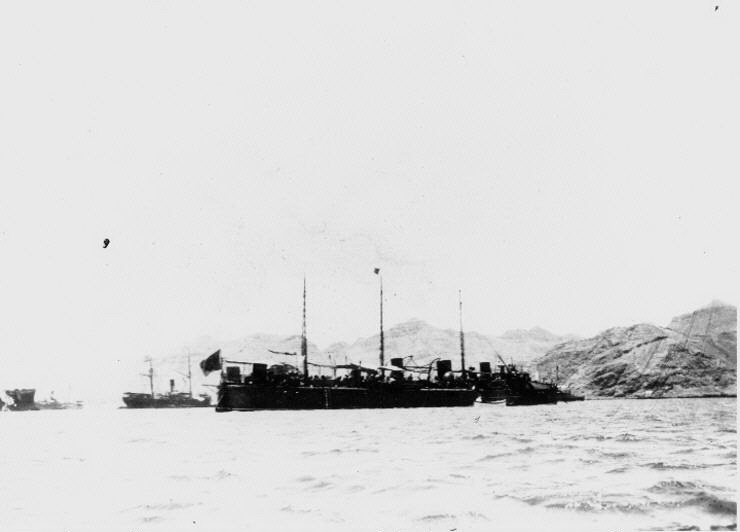
An unidentified Spanish destroyer – either Furor, Terror, or Plutón – with Cervera's squadron at São Vicente sometime between 14 and 29 April 1898.

=== Spanish-American War ===
==== Early operations ====
As tensions between Spain and the United States grew in early 1898, Furor became part of the 1st Torpedo Boat Division, which also included Terror, the destroyer Plutón, and the torpedo boats Ariete, Azor, and Rayo. Furor served as flagship of the division's commander, Capitán de navío (Ship-of-the-Line Captain) Fernando Villaamil. The division was assigned to the Spanish Navy's 1st Squadron, commanded by Cervera. The squadron was ordered to concentrate at São Vicente in Portugal's Cape Verde Islands. Accordingly, the three destroyers departed Cádiz on 12 March and proceeded to São Vicente in company. Infanta Maria Teresa (Cervera's flagship) and Cristobal Colon departed Cádiz on 8 April and arrived at São Vicente on 14 April. The ships had experienced mechanical problems and burned an excessive amount of coal during the voyage. Soon, Almirante Oquendo and Vizcaya reinforced the squadron.

While Furor was at São Vicente, the Spanish–American War began when the United States declared war on Spain on 25 April 1898, stipulating that the declaration was retroactive to 25 April. Neutral Portugal, in accordance with international law, ordered the Spanish ships to leave São Vicente within 24 hours of the declaration of war. Leaving Ariete, Azor, and Rayo — which were too small for a transatlantic voyage — behind at São Vicente, Furor and the rest of Cervera's squadron departed — after coaling delays — on 29 April 1898, bound for San Juan, Puerto Rico. The 1st Torpedo Boat Division was incorporated directly into Cervera's squadron, leaving Villaamil with no formal command responsibilities, but he chose to remain aboard Furor for the deployment to the Caribbean anyway. Because of continuing engine trouble and low coal supplies, Furor and her fellow destroyers were towed part of the way across the Atlantic Ocean, casting off to steam under their own power when two days from landfall in the Caribbean. Cervera's ships reached the vicinity of French-owned Martinique in the Lesser Antilles on 10 May 1898.

Minister of the Navy Bermejo's communications with Cervera while Cervera was at São Vicente had not made clear that the United States had declared war, but Cervera did have orders from Bermejo to gather information at Fort-de-France on Martinique. When the squadron arrived in the vicinity of Martinique, Cervera ordered Villaamil to take Furor and Terror into port at Fort-de-France to gather intelligence on U.S. naval operations and ascertain whether a collier with 5,000 tons of coal would be awaiting his squadron at Curaçao.

While the other ships remained in international waters, steaming slowly toward the Saint Lucia Channel north of Martinique, Furor and Terror detached from the squadron under Villaamil's command at 10:00 on 10 May 1898. Shortly after the squadron lost sight of the two destroyers, Terror suffered a boiler explosion that crippled her. Furor took Terror under tow. At dawn on 11 May, Cervera's squadron sighted two columns of smoke on the horizon and prepared for action on the assumption that it came from approaching U.S. warships, but soon determined that it came from Furor and Terror, which were approaching very slowly. With Terror and Cervera's squadron in sight of one another, Furor dropped her tow line and proceeded alone toward Fort-de-France. The U.S. Navy auxiliary cruiser USS Harvard was just leaving Fort-de-France on 11 May when Furor arrived. Furor did not sight Harvard, but Harvard sighted Furor and, assuming that Furor was in company with Cervera′s entire squadron, turned away and departed the area at full speed. The following day, the American press characterized Harvard′s sighting of Furor as the first naval encounter of the war.

Upon arriving at Fort-de-France, Villaamil met with the Spanish consul, who had received no news from the Spanish government. After Villaamil's meeting with the consul, the Governor of Martinique, Noël Pardon, informed Villaamil that he could not permit Furor to depart Fort-de-France until 13 May because the U.S. Navy auxiliary cruiser USS Harvard had just left port, and in accordance with international law and France's neutrality, Furor, as a belligerent warship, could not leave port until 48 hours after Harvard had left. Villaamil threatened to bombard the port if he was not allowed to leave immediately. Pardon appeared to acquiesce, but then ordered all of the harbor pilots to remain at home so that Furor could not depart safely in darkness. However, the captain of the Spanish ocean liner Alicante, stationed at Fort-de-France as a hospital ship, stationed his boatswains with lanterns at key points in the channel so Furor could depart safely without a pilot. Villaamil took advantage of this by taking Furor out into the harbor under the ruse of testing her engines, then successfully made a dash out into international waters on the night of 11–12 May.

At dusk on 11 May, Cervera's squadron approached Martinique to rendezvous with Furor. In the predawn darkness of 12 May, the squadron sighted Furor′s searchlight blinking the letter "R" in Morse code — the agreed-upon recognition signal — and Infanta Maria Teresa responded with the letter "A," confirming her identity as well. Furor thus rejoined the squadron, and Villaamil came aboard Infanta Maria Teresa at around 03:00 to provide a report to Cervera, including newspaper clippings confirming that Spain was at war with the United States. Cervera ordered Terror′s 75 mm (3-inch) guns to be transferred to Infanta Maria Teresa, and the squadron then towed the crippled Terror to the vicinity of Fort-de-France so that she could put into port there for repairs.

Leaving Terror behind, Furor and the rest of Cervera's squadron set out on 12 May 1898 for Dutch-owned Curaçao, where Cervera expected to meet a collier, unaware that Bermejo had ordered the collier to Martinique instead. The squadron arrived at Willemstad on 14 May, but the Netherlands also was neutral, and strictly enforced its neutrality by allowing only Vizcaya and Infanta Maria Teresa to enter port and permitting them to load only 600 tons of coal. On 15 May, Cervera's ships departed, no longer bound for San Juan, which by now was under a U.S. Navy blockade, but for as-yet unblockaded Santiago de Cuba on the southeastern coast of Cuba, arriving there on 19 May 1898. Cervera hoped to refit his ships there before he could be trapped. His squadron was still in the harbor of Santiago de Cuba when the U.S. Navy′s Flying Squadron arrived on 27 May 1898 and began a blockade which would drag on for 37 days.

The U.S. Navy's North Atlantic Squadron arrived off Santiago de Cuba on 1 June 1898 to reinforce the Flying Squadron. During the blockade, Furor and the others endured occasional American naval bombardments of the harbor; during one such bombardment on 6 June 1898, she took a shell hit in her bunkerage, but suffered no serious damage. Some of her men joined others from the fleet in a "Naval Brigade" to fight alongside Spanish Army troops against a United States Army overland drive toward Santiago de Cuba.

==== Battle of Santiago de Cuba ====
By the beginning of July 1898, the American overland drive threatened to capture Santiago de Cuba, and Cervera decided that his squadron's only hope was to try to escape into the open sea by running the blockade. The decision was made on 1 July 1898, with the break-out set for 3 July 1898. The crew of Furor spent 2 July 1898 returning from Naval Brigade service and preparing for action. Furor was to be the fifth ship in line during the escape, following the four armored cruisers and with Plutón behind her; while Infanta Maria Teresa sacrificed herself by attacking the fastest American ship, the armored cruiser USS Brooklyn, Furor and the others were to avoid action, put on all the speed they could, and run for the open sea.

At about 08:45 on 3 July 1898, the Spanish ships got underway. The U.S. squadron sighted the Spanish ships in the channel at about 09:35, and the Battle of Santiago de Cuba began.

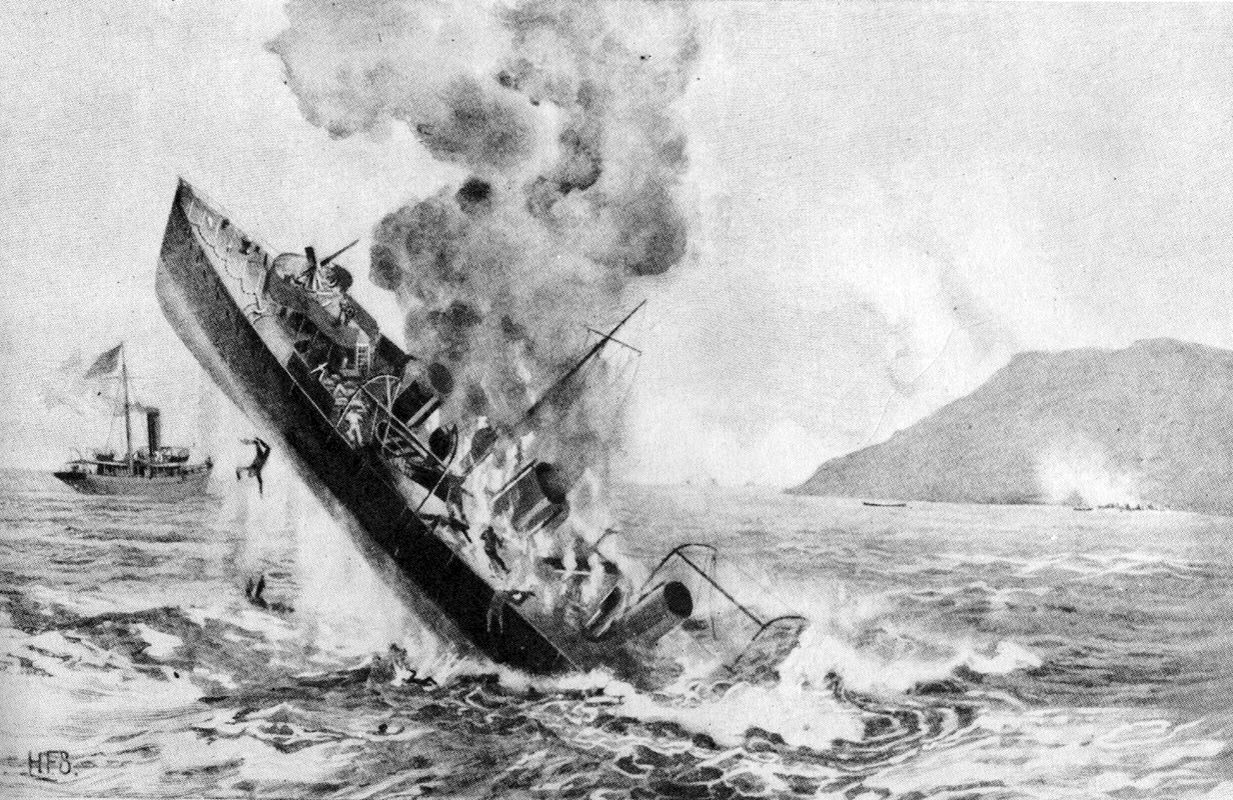
LEFT: Furor under attack by the battleships USS Iowa and USS Indiana and the armored cruiser USS New York during the Battle of Santiago de Cuba on 3 July 1898. The illustration is not an accurate depiction of the battle. (Image by R. Verdugo Landi, Nuevo Mundo, Madrid, 13 July 1898) RIGHT: The Sinking of the Furor (1898 illustration by Howard Freeman Sprague)

While the four armored cruisers turned to starboard to run westward, Furor and Plutón turned inside them and made their run closer to the coast. The blockading American battleships and armored cruisers opened fire on the two destroyers as they emerged from the channel, hitting both destroyers several times, but then turned their attention to pursuing the Spanish armored cruisers. The two damaged destroyers put on speed, pursued only by the armed yacht USS Gloucester, a ship less well armed than the destroyers, but larger, faster, and undamaged. Gloucester hit both destroyers repeatedly. In short order, casualties aboard Furor began to climb, and her stern flooded and became submerged; all her boilers were destroyed and her engine damaged; fires broke out in several places, including a particularly bad one in the engine room, which lay over the shell room, causing a danger of explosion; a hole was punched in her side; and finally her steering failed.

Too badly damaged to continue, Plutón ran herself aground at 10:45 on the beach just west of Cabanas Bay. Now alone, Furor survived only five more minutes. Still firing her guns, but with half her crew killed or wounded and clearly doomed, Furor struck her colors and began to lower her boats. Several American projectiles struck Spanish sailors struggling in the water before the Americans realized she had surrendered and ceased firing at her. Two American boats came alongside and began to take off survivors, but quickly pushed away again, fearing an imminent magazine explosion, which promptly occurred. Furor sank about a nautical mile (1.2 miles; 1.9 km) offshore in deep water at 10:50.

Villaamil died aboard Furor, as did over half of her crew. Those of her crew who got ashore had to beware of Cuban insurgents, who began shooting Spanish sailors they found along the shore. Other survivors were recovered by U.S. sailors in boats.
