= Fernando Villaamil =

Spanish naval officer

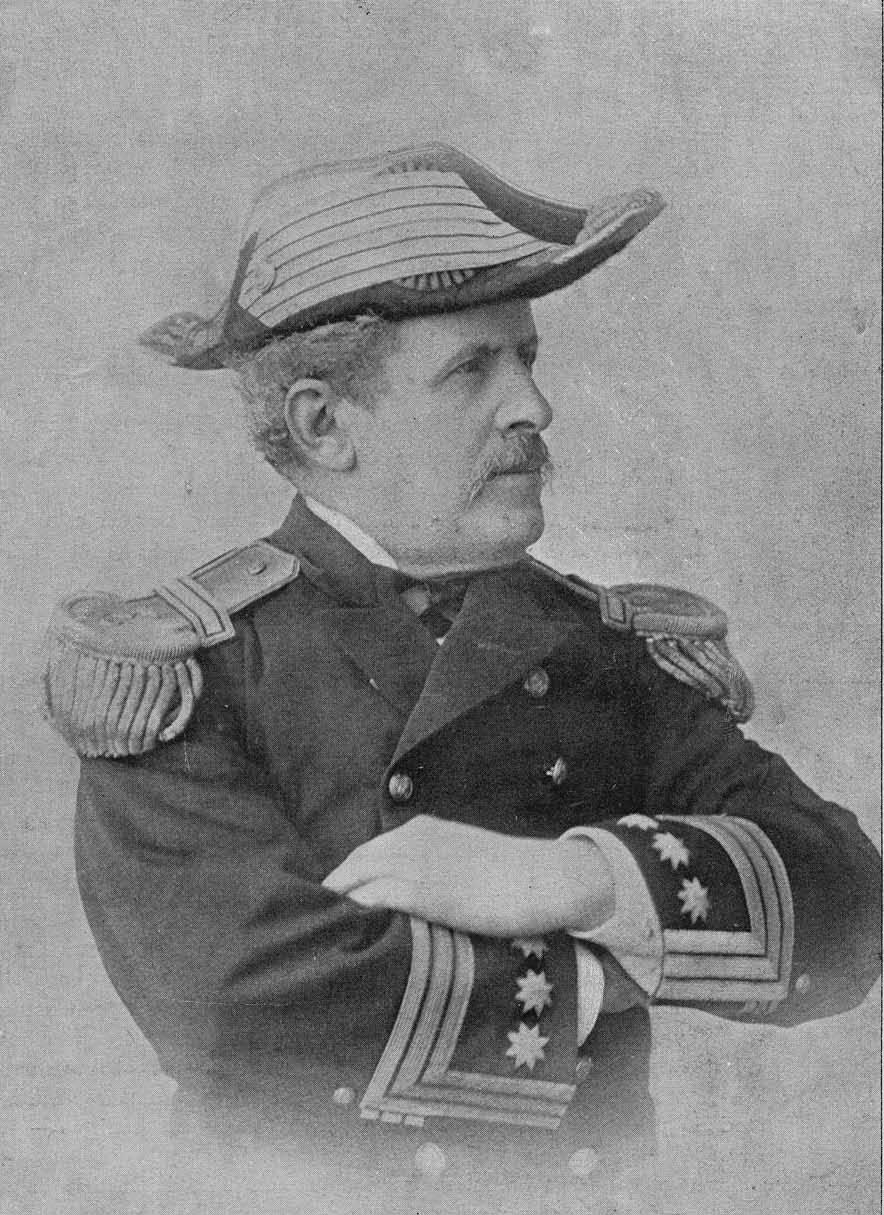
Formal photo portrait, c.1897

Fernando Villaamil Fernández-Cueto (November 23, 1845 – July 3, 1898) was a Spanish Navy officer best known being the inventor of the modern destroyer concept and for his death in action during the Battle of Santiago de Cuba during the Spanish–American War. He was the highest-ranking Spanish officer to die in the conflict.

== The origins ==
Fernando Villaamil was born in Serantes, near Castropol (Asturias), in the north of Spain, less than a mile from the Cantabrian Sea coastline. He descended from a family of respected noblemen and landowners, but his father found himself almost completely ruined, and had to sell all his property, including the family ancestral home. It seems that this event produced a strong mixed feeling of both affection and anger about his native region in Fernando, which would last for the rest of his life.

In 1861 he entered the Spanish Navy Colegio Naval de San Fernando, and one year later he went, as midshipman, aboard the frigate Esperanza, the first of the long series of warships on which he would serve his nation until the final Furor.

He then served in the Philippines and Cuba, the last remains of the Spanish Empire, and in 1873 he was back in Spain and was nominated as a teacher in the Naval School that the Spanish Navy held aboard a frigate anchored in the naval base of Ferrol. Along the following years Villaamil took advantage of the studying and writing opportunities presented by his new job, becoming one of the best known and respected Spanish Navy officers.

== The Destructor ==
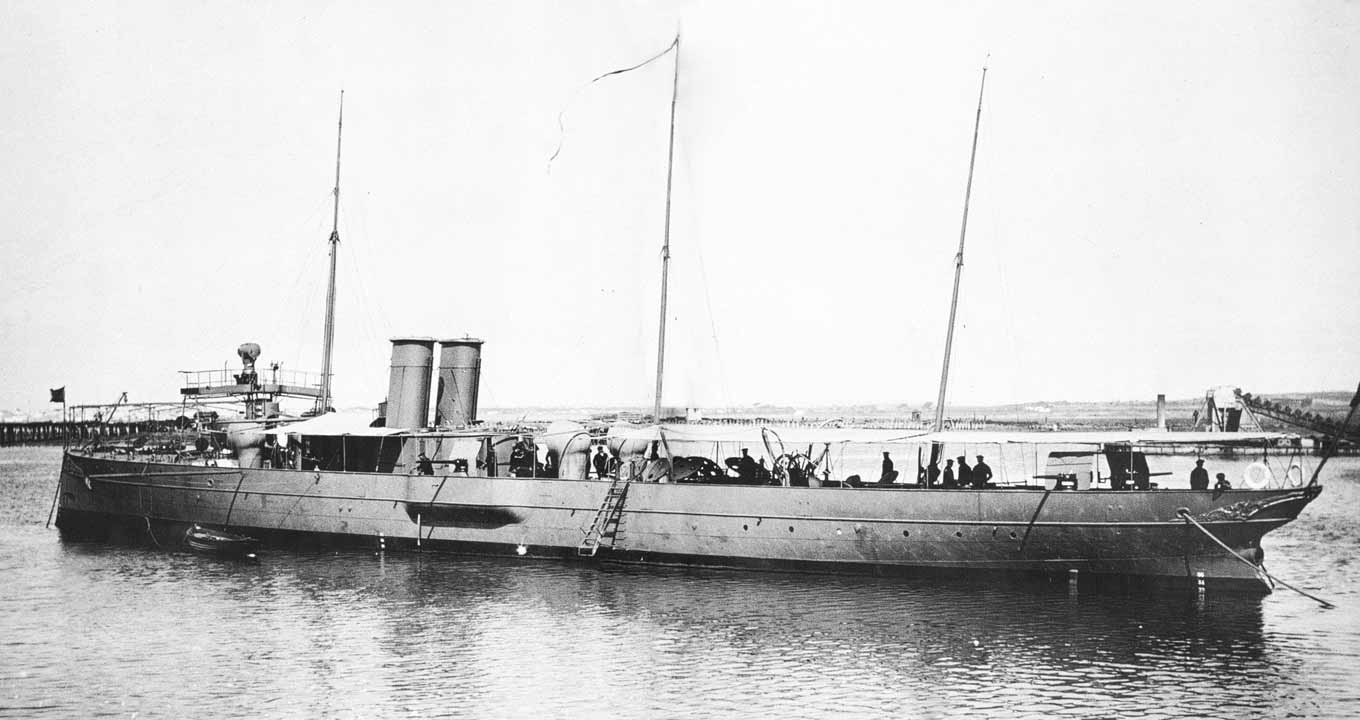
The Destructor

In 1884, Villaamil was appointed Second Officer in the Ministry of the Navy. As such, he took the initiative of studying and designing a new class of warship intended to fight the then-new torpedo boats.

Once he reached his conclusions on the subject, he obtained the agreement of the Minister of the Navy, Manuel Pezuela, and requested several British shipyards to make proposals that would fulfill his specifications. He selected the design submitted by James & George Thompson, in Clydebank. Work on the new vessel began in late 1885.

Villaamil was assigned to Great Britain to supervise the work and study the operating procedures of the British naval dockyards, as well as the new Engineers corps. On January 19, 1887, the Destructor, the first torpedo boat destroyer, was formally handed over to the Spanish Navy, with great expectations from the European naval community.

On the 24 the ship, which had reached 22.5 knots (41.7 km/h) in the trials, weighed anchor in Falmouth, bounded for Vigo, with Villaamil in command. Twenty-four hours later, she reached the Spanish coast, making 18 knots (33 km/h) through a stormy Bay of Biscay.

In one day the doubts about the ship's seaworthiness were answered forever, and her designer and commander had every reason to feel proud. As a consequence of the success of the Destructor, Villaamil's professional reputation grew, both in Spain and abroad.

== Around the world aboard the Nautilus ==
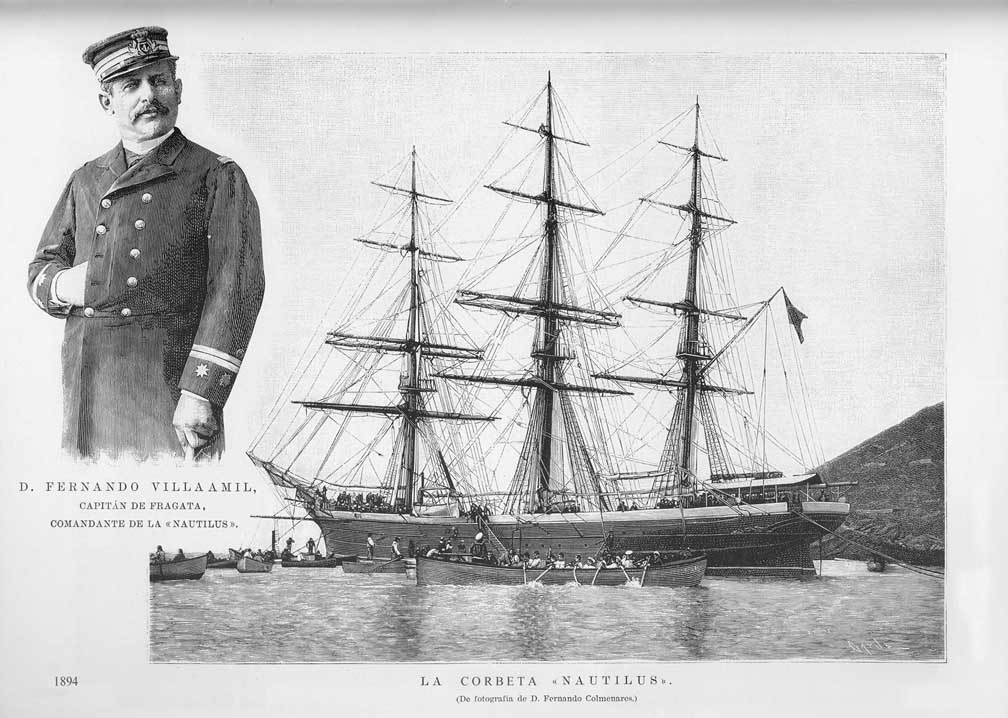
Fernando Villaamil and Nautilus, 1894

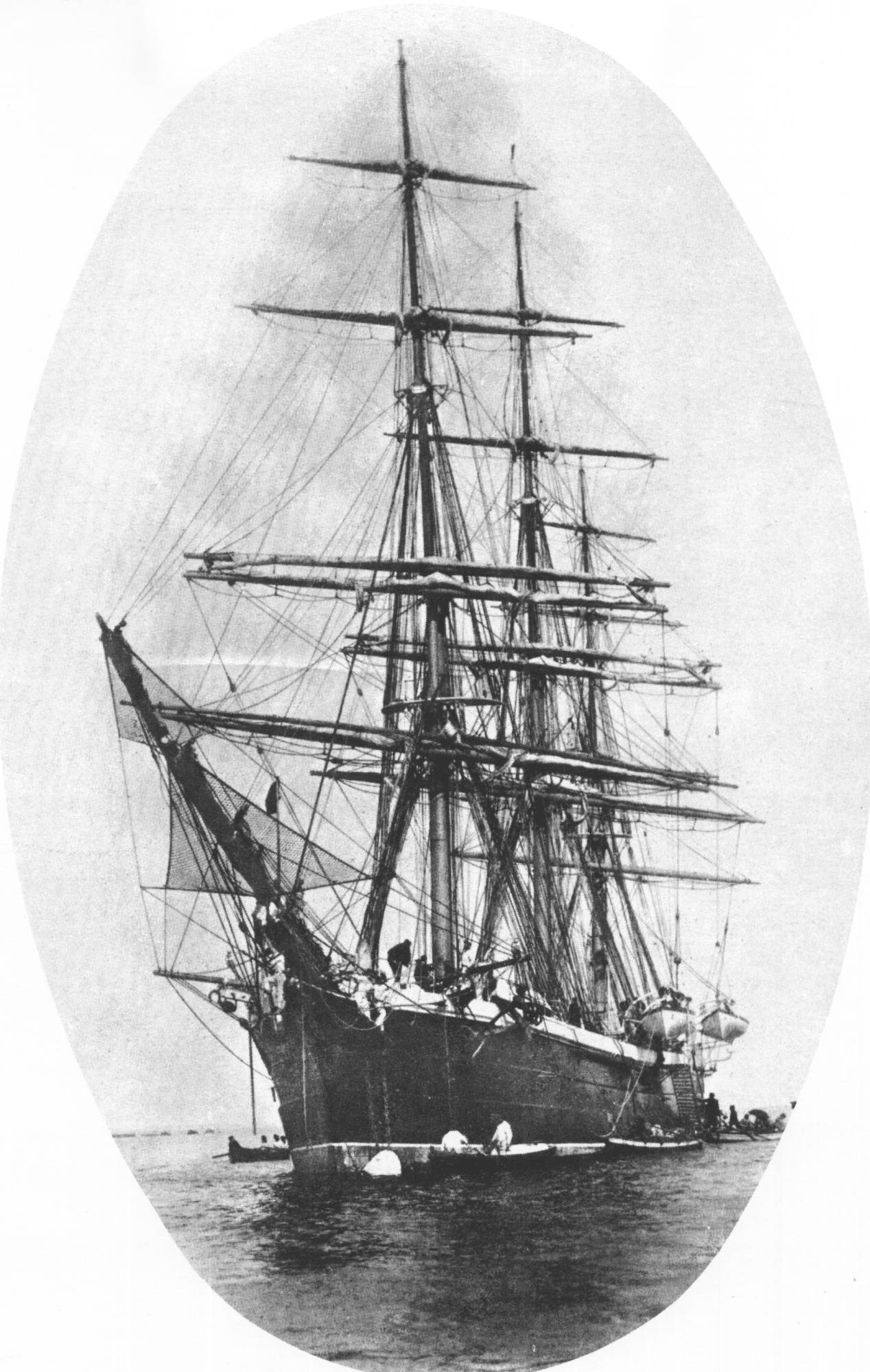
Another view of Nautilus

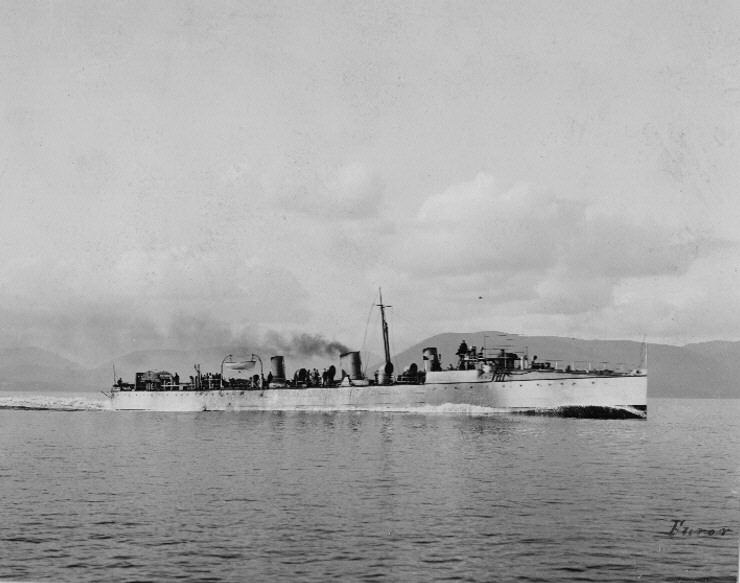
Furor during sea trials, 1896

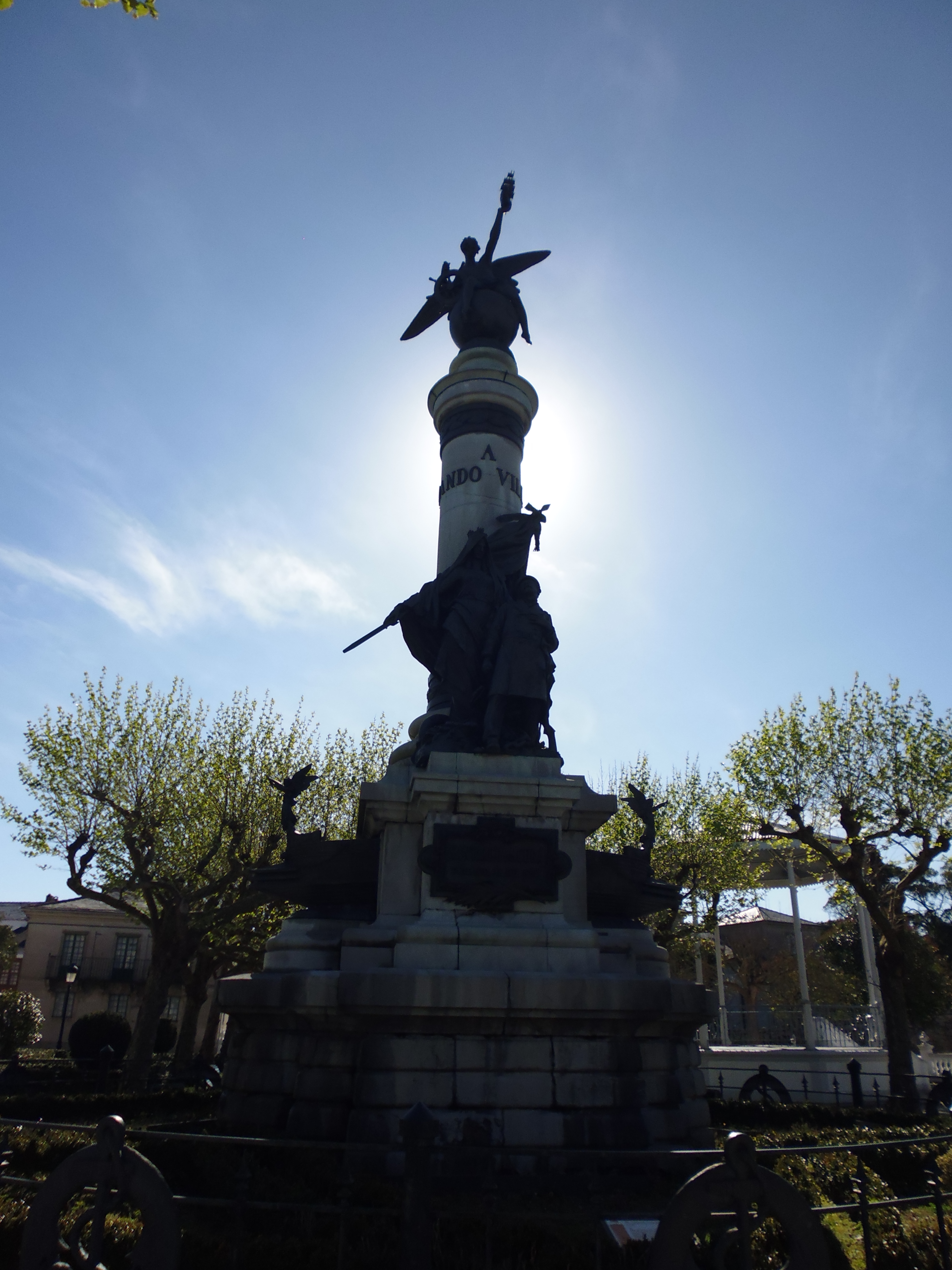
Memorial to Villaamil erected in 1911 in Castropol

Villaamil was a strong advocate of oceanic sailing as the best training for the young Navy officers and in 1892, being appointed commander of the corvette Nautilus he took advantage of the celebrations of the fourth centenary of America's discovery to get approval for an instruction cruise around the world, rounding the three Great Capes.

On November 30, 1892, Nautilus left Ferrol, in the northwest end of Spain. She rounded Cape Agulhas and Cape Leeuwin, passed through Bass and Cook straits, rounded Cape Horn, went to New York City and eventually, after sailing forty thousand miles, came back to Spain on a shining Sunday, July 16, 1894, in San Sebastián.

Here the sailors suddenly realized that an approaching launch hoisted the royal pennant. It was the Regent Queen and her son, the child King Alfonso XIII, coming to welcome Villaamil and all the Nautilus crew.

The world cruise increased Villamil's popularity even more. He published the story of the voyage in an excellent book in which he not only reported on the events of the cruise, but also on his thoughts on many things he found around the world. His comments on the comparison between British and Spanish colonies are impressively meaningful and well-written. One cannot avoid a thrill when reading Villaamil's reflections after visiting, in May 1894, the Cramp shipyards in Philadelphia, where two battleships and three cruisers were in different stages of construction. He wrote: "While I'm not in a position to decipher the aims that this nation has set itself [...], I notice that in the last years, in an unexpected way, it devotes its attention and money to acquiring warships that represent the latest advances in naval engineering". Indeed, he didn't know that four years later his destiny would make a fatal appointment with those impressive warships, annihilating him, many of his sea-fellows, all their ships and the last remains of the Spanish Empire.

== The Spanish–American War ==
During the following years, Villaamil and some other forward-thinking colleagues tried to make the Spanish public aware of the critical deficiencies of the Navy.

Then, events rushed ahead: tension with the United States was rising quickly, and on February 16, 1898—the day following the explosion of the USS Maine in Havana—Villaamil was appointed Chief of the First Division of torpedo boats and destroyers.

Meanwhile, a totally unrealistic feeling of unbeatable naval power spread over Spain, and the Government decided that a whole fleet, commanded by Admiral Pascual Cervera, should be sent across the Atlantic, contrary to Cervera's and the Spanish Navy's own advice.

Villaamil and his First Division left Cádiz on March 13, and on April 18 they gathered with Admiral Cervera's fleet in the Cape Verde islands.

A month later, on April 24, the United States declared war on Spain, and Cervera received the order to go to the Antilles. Villaamil's Division was split, its destroyers integrated in Cervera's fleet, and the torpedo boats sent back to Spain.

Thus, Villaamil was left with no very specific responsibilities. He could have returned to Spain, but he chose to go forward with his fellows, even though he was totally aware of the disaster the ill-prepared fleet was headed for.

He was always in disagreement with both the Spanish Government's shaky war direction and Cervera's rather passive strategy. Instead, he advocated trying to offset the superiority of the American forces by scattering the fleet and taking the initiative through quick and dispersed daring actions; and he even volunteered to lead an audacious diversionary attack to New York with his destroyers, but his proposals were not accepted.

Therefore, Villaamil had to resign himself unwillingly to be shut with all the fleet in the bay of Santiago de Cuba.

In the end, on July 3 the whole Spanish fleet came out through the narrow mouth of the bay, ship by ship, with no chances of surviving the incoming battle with the US fleet.

== The end ==
Villaamil was killed on board one of his destroyers, the Furor. Francisco Arderius, officer in the ship, reported Fernando Villaamil's end:

After several gunshots that caused tremendous damage and many casualties, Capitán de Navio Villaamil went up to the prow gun platform; when I was about to follow him, a grenade exploded there [...]. I could only see a flood of blood coming down. [...] Shortly after we went overboard, the ship, already on fire, sunk with the lifeless body of Don Fernando Villaamil.

== Commemoration ==
The Spanish Navy destroyer Villaamil was named for Villaamil. She was in commission from 1916 to 1932.

== Sources ==
- Villaamil, Fernando. "Viaje de circunnavegación de la corbeta Nautilus". Madrid: Sucesores de Ribadeneyra, 1895. Reedit. Madrid: Editorial Naval, 1989 ISBN 84-7341-047-5.
- Castropol a Fernando Villaamil, [Special issue, fully dedicated to Fernando Villaamil, of Castropol ten-daily newspaper]. Castropol, 1912.
- Camba, Francisco. Fernando Villaamil. Madrid: Editora Nacional, 1944.
- Serrano Monteavaro, Miguel Angel. Fernando Villaamil: Una vida entre la mar y el dolor. Madrid: Asamblea Amistosa Literaria, 1988 ISBN 84-404-2716-6.
- Muñiz, Oscar. El Capitán de la Reina. Gijón: Llibros del Pexe, 1995. ISBN 84-89985-11-1
