= Coaling (ships) =

Refueling steamships with coal

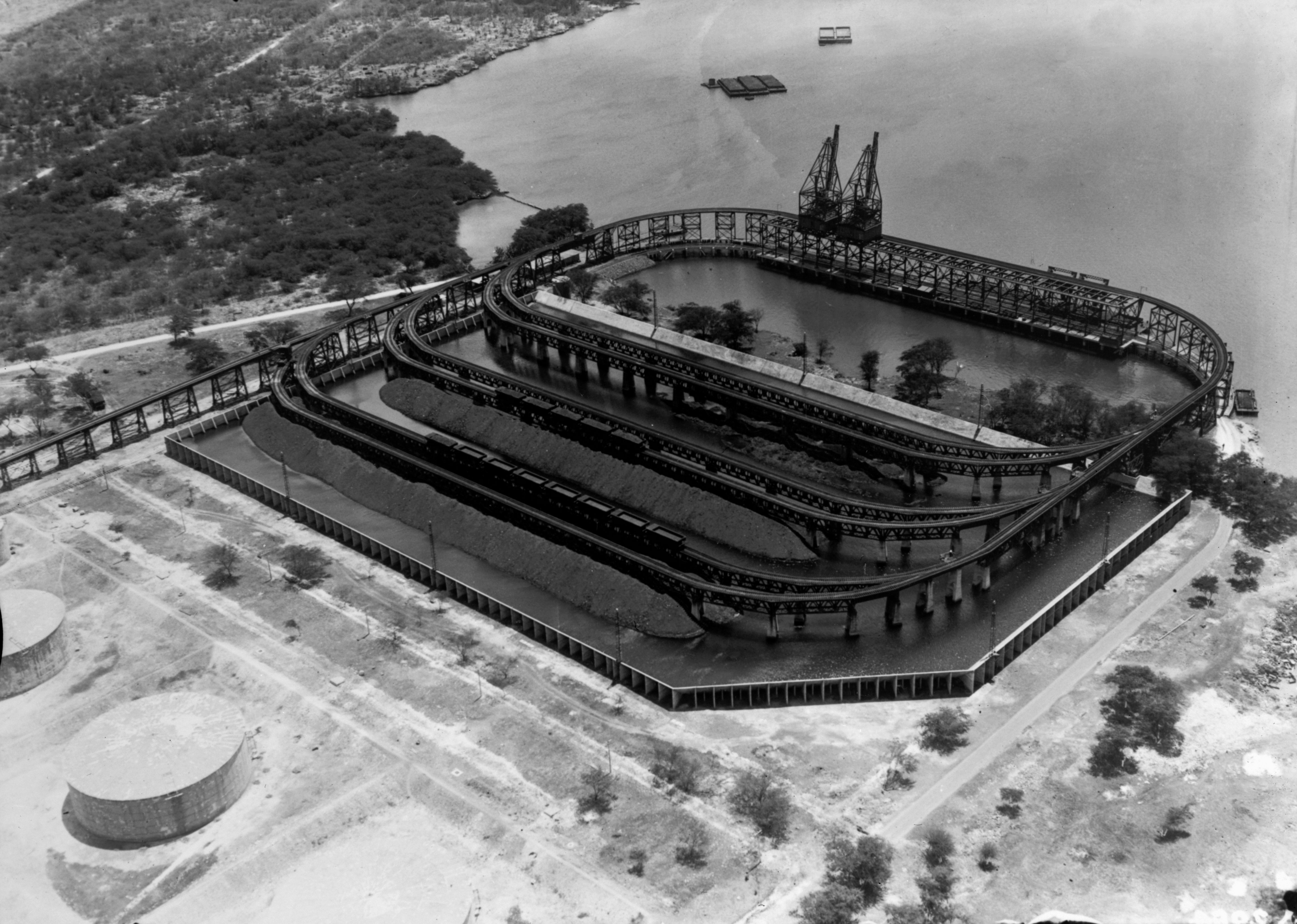
Pearl Harbor coaling station in 1919.

Coaling is the process of loading coal onto coal-fuelled ships, particularly warships. The lengthy refueling required by coal-fuelled steam ships brought considerable additional risk to the ship and hardship to the crew. Coal could not be pumped and, once loaded, it had to be continuously moved to ensure bunkers nearest the boilers were always full should full power be suddenly needed.

== Necessity of nearby friendly ports ==
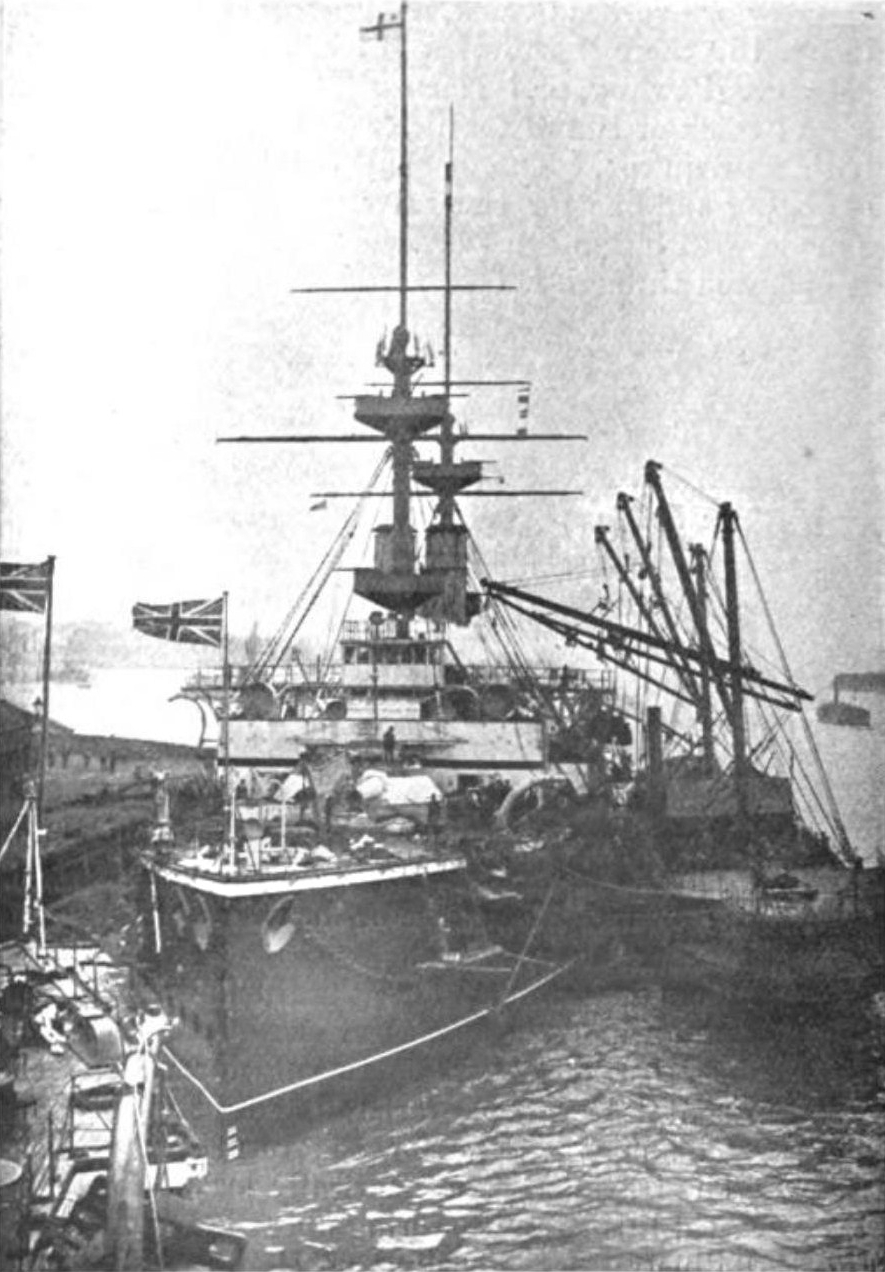
HMS Majestic at a coaling station

The replacement of sailing ships with steam led to the requirement that coal be widely available. Coaling a warship was a much hated, dirty, and unavoidable task normally carried out in port with a collier alongside, during which time the ship was unable to fight and vulnerable to attack. Once coaling had started it continued day and night until completed.

The denial of port facilities to the Russian Baltic Fleet, forcing them to overload themselves with coal, played a part in their defeat at Tsushima in 1905. Commander Semenoff described the problems facing the fleet required to sail around the world with very few friendly coaling ports. His ship, the Borodino-class battleship Knyaz Suvorov, found all neutral ports closed, leaving it the choice of either coaling at anchor three miles off the coast—regarded as very risky or even impossible even in good weather—or carrying additional fuel. The Borodino class battleships—already 2.5 ft lower in the water than designed and weighted-down even carrying their designed maximum of 1100 tonnes—took on a total 2200 tonnes of coal. They even used the main deck and were regarded as potentially at risk of capsizing in a strong wind. The Suvorov coaled for 29 hours in tropical heat, the sailors keeping cotton wool between their teeth to avoid inhaling coal dust. Semenoff reckoned no one could work for more than 20 minutes in those conditions.

== Vulnerability ==
Warships were stationary targets operating without power during coaling. The British battlecruisers in the Falklands in 1914 were fortunate that Admiral Von Spee missed a "golden opportunity" to attack them.

== United States Navy procedures ==
The call to "Rig ship for coaling!" was an unwelcome announcement of a day of backbreaking work shovelling coal into canvas bags aboard a collier, hoisting those bags onto the warship, dumping the bags near the coal bunkers, and shovelling the coal into the bunkers. The following day was spent cleaning the warship of the black coal dust which had penetrated every crevice and corner of the ship including its living quarters and food supplies.

Removing the coal dust clinging to their sweat-drenched skin after coaling required each man to wash while sitting balanced atop the bucket of fresh water he had been issued for the purpose. There were no showers. The deck was covered with nude sailors, each trying to avoid overturning his bucket while carefully washing himself over his bucket so that the water flowing off his torso returned to the bucket for re-use. A shipmate might be asked to scrub another's back.

== Need for coaling infrastructure ==
In 1908, Rear Admiral Sir Christopher Cradock declared that expeditious coaling was essential for the efficiency of the navy and lamented the fact that dockyards still hadn't changed ship design specifically to facilitate it. Noting that "the question of rapid coaling appears to me to have never been really studied, and even now it is in its infancy", he said no detail should be left untouched to ensure completion in the quickest possible manner. Every single officer and man that can be spared, should get into the collier to dig out the coal. Other recommendations were that coaling was always done from the same side, that this was kept free of obstructions and that marks were made on the refuelling collier so that it was easy to align the two ships in the best position. Using these techniques, the battleship HMS King Edward VII broke records, receiving 1,180 long tons (1,200 t) of coal at 289.2 long tons (293.8 t) an hour.

== Provision of coal supplies ==
In Britain, the Severn Tunnel (completed 1886) was constructed primarily to speed the transport of high quality steam coal from the South Wales coalfield to the Royal Navy dockyards around Portsmouth.
