= Cámara's Flying Relief Column =

1898 Spanish naval task force

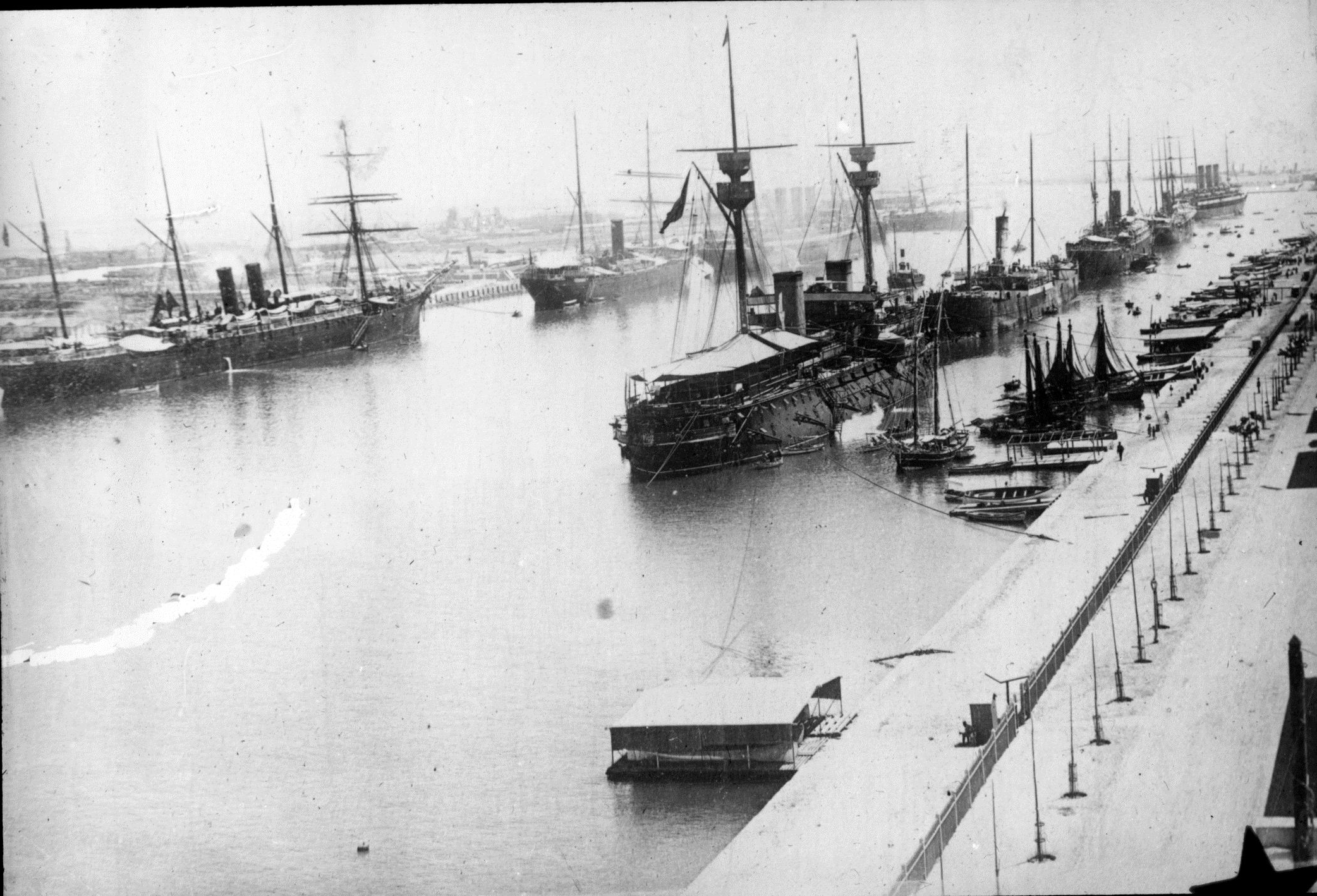
Admiral's Spanish Fleet Cámara anchored in the Suez Canal, formed by the best ships of the Spanish Navy, among others by the battleship Pelayo or the cruiser Emperador Carlos V and who ultimately didn't fight in the war.

During the Spanish–American War of 1898, Cámara's Flying Relief Column was a naval task force of Spain's most powerful warships, under the command of Counter-admiral Manuel de la Cámara, tasked with relieving Spanish forces in Manila after the defeat of Spanish Pacific Squadron under Admiral Patricio Montojo y Pasarón by the American Asiatic Squadron under Commodore George Dewey in the Battle of Manila Bay on May 1, 1898. The Spanish fleet, consisting of the battleship Pelayo, armored cruiser Emperador Carlos V, auxiliary cruisers Patriota and Rapido, destroyers Audaz, Osado, and Prosepina, and transports Buenos Aires and Panay, left Spain in June 1898. The squadron was far more powerful than that commanded by Dewey, which only consisted of four protected cruisers and two gunboats. The monitor USS Monterey had been ordered from the U.S. to the Philippines, and departed on 11 June.

With the bulk of the Spanish Navy heading to the Pacific, the U.S. made plans for battleships Iowa and Oregon and the cruiser USS Brooklyn to raid and bombard Spanish ports. But, following the destruction of the Spanish fleet in the Battle of Santiago de Cuba, Cámara's column was ordered to return to Spain to defend the Spanish coast. On 7 July, after arriving in Egypt, Cámara's fleet turned home, and the American battleships never left the Caribbean.
