= Spanish battleship Pelayo =

Battleship of the Spanish Navy

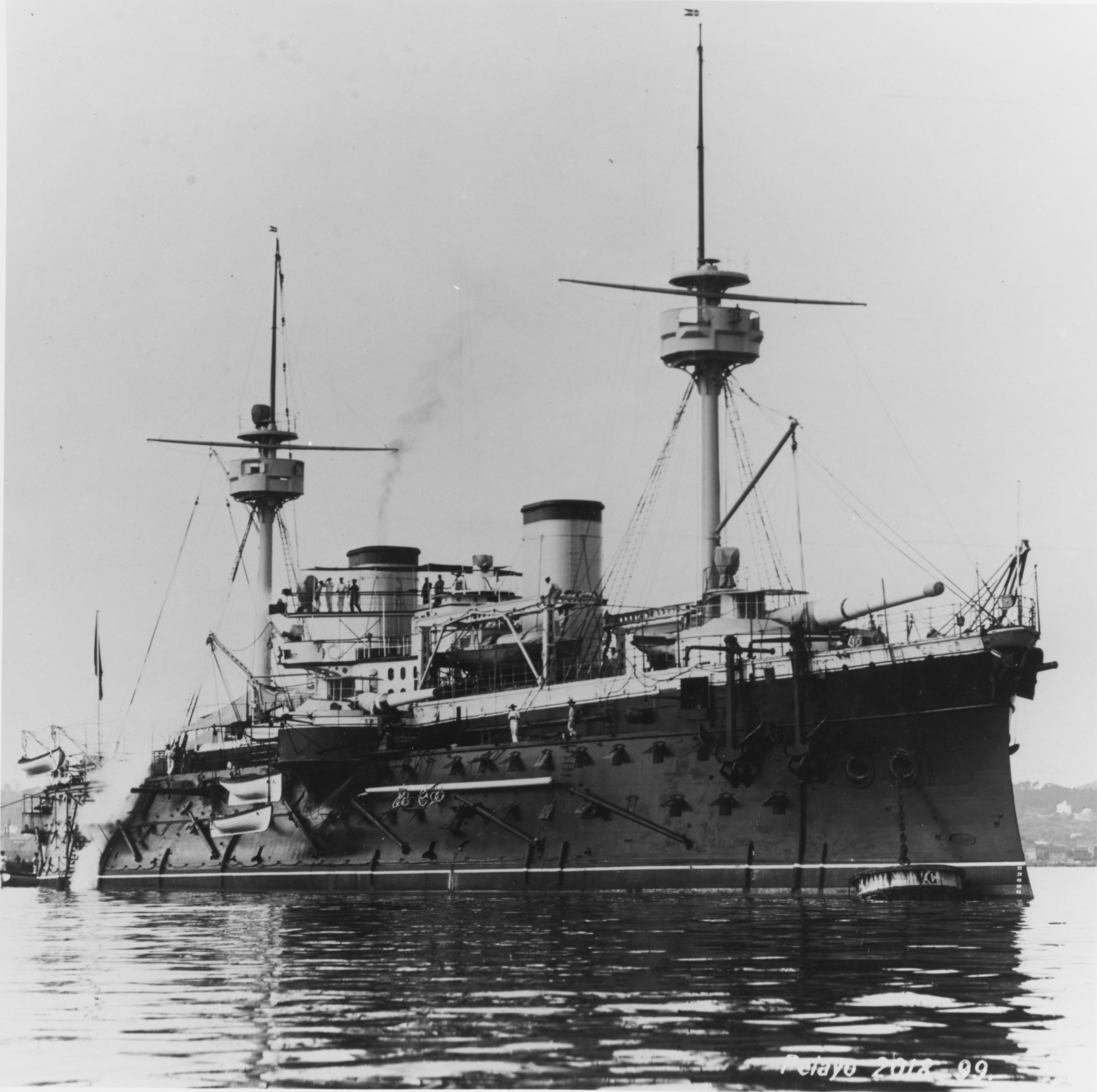
- Pelayo in 1889

Class overview
- Name: Pelayo
- Preceded by: None
- Succeeded by: España class
- Built: 1885–1888
- In commission: 1888–1924
- Completed: 1
- Scrapped: 1

History

Armada Española Ensign
- Name: Pelayo
- Namesake: Pelagius of Asturias (ca. 685–737), founder of the Kingdom of Asturias who initiated the Reconquista
- Ordered: 12 November 1884
- Builder: Forges et Chantiers de la Méditerranée, La Seyne-sur-Mer, France
- Laid down: April 1885 or February 1886 (see text)
- Launched: 5 February 1887
- Completed: 3 June 1888
- Commissioned: 8 September 1888
- Decommissioned: 1 August 1924
- Nickname(s): Solitario ("The Individualist," "The Solitary One," or "The Lonely One")
- Fate: Scrapped 1926
- Notes: Disarmed 1923

General characteristics
- Type: Battleship
- Displacement: 9,745 long tons (9,901 t) (standard); 10,810 long tons (10,983 t) (full load)
- Length: 393 ft 8 in (119.99 m)
- Beam: 66 ft 3 in (20.19 m)
- Draft: 24 ft 9 in (7.54 m) maximum
- Depth: 15.50 m (50 ft 10 in)
- Installed power: 9,600 ihp (7,159 kW) (forced draft); 8,000 ihp (5,966 kW) (natural draft) on trials
- Propulsion: As built: Two vertical compound steam engines, 12 return-tube boilers, two shafts, 800 tons coal; 1897–1898: 16 Niclausse boilers
- Sail plan: As built: 4,000 sq ft (372 m^{2})(quickly removed)
- Speed: As built: 16.7 knots (30.9 km/h; 19.2 mph) (forced draft); 16.2 knots (30.0 km/h; 18.6 mph) (natural draft) on trials
- Range: 2,000 to 3,000 nmi (3,700 to 5,600 km; 2,300 to 3,500 mi)
- Complement: 520
- Armament: (1888 as built); 2 × 32 cm (12.6 in) guns; 2 × 28 cm (11.0 in) guns; 1 × 16 cm (6.3 in) gun; 12 × 12 cm (4.7 in) guns; 5 × 6 pounder (57-mm) Hotchkiss quick-firing guns; 14 × machine guns; 7 × 356 mm (14 in) torpedo tubes; (1898 as reconstructed); 2 × 32 cm (12.6 in) guns; 2 × 28 cm (11.0 in) guns; 9 × 14 cm (5.5 in) guns; 5 × 6 pounder quick-firing guns; 14 × machine guns; 6 × 356 mm (14 in) torpedo tubes; 1910: All torpedo tubes removed
- Armor: Creusot steel; Belt 17.75–11.75 in (451–298 mm); Barbettes 15.75–11.75 in (400–298 mm); Shields 3.125 in (79 mm); Conning tower 6.125 in (156 mm); Deck 2.75–2 in (70–51 mm); Midships battery unarmored as built; 3 in (76.2 mm) Harvey armor after 1897–1898 reconstruction

Pelayo was a battleship of the Spanish Navy. Named after Pelagius of Asturias, Pelayo was launched in 1887 and became the most powerful Spanish warship when she was commissioned in 1888. Pelayo was Spain's first battleship and the only pre-dreadnought battleship the Spanish navy ever commissioned. As a capital ship with a unique design and capabilities, Spanish naval authorities struggled to situate her in the navy, though Pelayo soon became popular among the Spanish public for representing Spain at several major naval and international events.

The battleship supported Spanish troops during the first Melillan campaign from 1893 to 1894, though she did not fire her guns in anger. Following the outbreak of the Spanish–American War in 1898 Pelayo was part of Cámara's Flying Relief Column, an abortive sortie to the Spanish Philippines under Counter-admiral Manuel de la Cámara, but returned to Spain without engaging American forces. During the war she was also part of an ultimately cancelled operation to bombard the East Coast of the United States, causing panic among the American public.

Pelayo participated in the second Melillan campaign in 1909, where she finally fired her guns in anger for the first time, and subsequently participated in the Kert campaign from 1911 to 1912 along with bombarding the coast of the Spanish protectorate in Morocco in 1913. The Spanish Navy commissioned the dreadnought battleship España in 1914, though both ships saw no combat in World War I as Spain renamed neutral in the conflict. By the 1920s Pelayo had become severely outdated and she was disarmed in 1923, decommissioned in 1924 and broken up in 1926.

== Technical characteristics ==
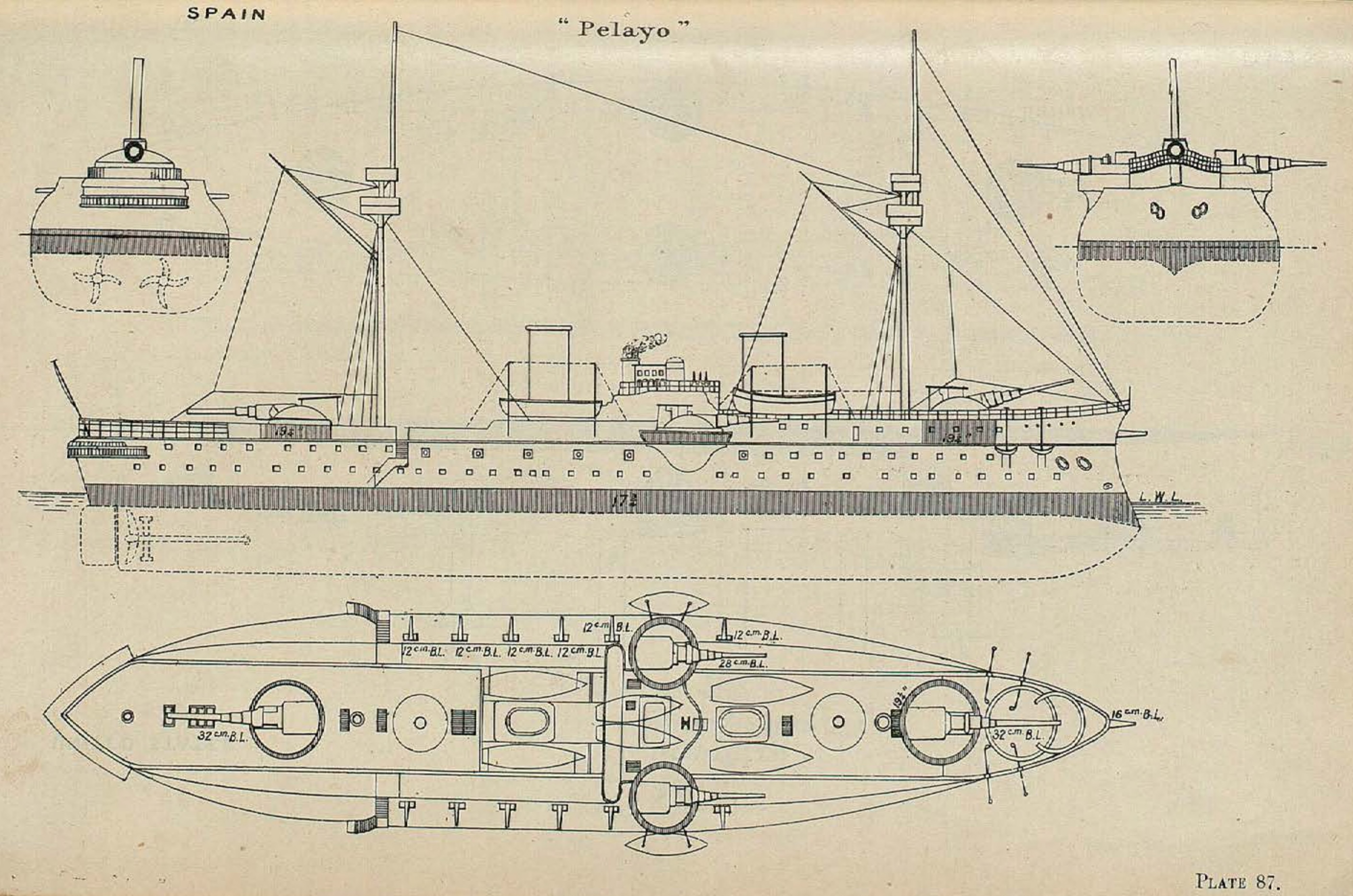
Right elevation and deck plan as depicted in Brassey's Naval Annual in 1896.

Pelayo was a barbette ship, an ancestor of the modern battleship with the main battery mounted in open barbettes on armored rotating platforms, in contrast to heavy self-contained gun turrets. Her design was based on that of the French barbette ship Marceau, modified to give her a draft that was 3 feet (0.9 m) shallower so that she could transit the Suez Canal at full-load displacement. She displaced 9,900 tons and was 105.60 metres (346 ft 5 in) in length, 20.20 metres (66 ft 3 in) in beam, 15.50 metres (50 ft 10 in) in depth, and 7.50 metres (24 ft 7 in) in draft. She had a crew of 630 men.

Profile of Pelayo with her appearance in 1890.

Pelayo′s main guns could be loaded in any position, and consisted of two Gonzalez Hontoria-built 32-centimetre (12.6 in) Canet guns mounted fore and aft on the centerline and two Gonzalez Hontoria 28-centimetre (11 in) guns, also in barbettes, with one mounted on either beam. Her lone 16-centimetre (6.3 in) gun was a bow chaser. She also was armed with twelve 120-millimetre (4.7 in) guns, six on each side, three 57-millimetre Hotchkiss quick-firing guns, thirteen 37-millimetre revolvers, four machine guns, and seven 356-millimetre (14 in) torpedo tubes.

The ship had two funnels. Her propulsion system consisted of 12 boilers and two vertical compound steam engines driving two screws. On trials, she achieved 9,600 indicated horsepower (7,159 kW) under forced draft and reached 16.7 knots (30.9 km/h; 19.2 mph). She could carry 800 tons of coal. She originally was equipped with 4,000 square feet (372 m^{2}) of sails, but they were deleted soon after her completion and her rigging was replaced by two military masts.

Pelayo had Creusot steel armor. Her belt armor was 2.1 metres (6 ft 11 in) wide amidships and extended 0.6 metres (2 ft) above and almost 1.5 metres (5 ft) below the waterline; it ranged in thickness from 45.1 to 29.8 centimetres (17.75 to 11.75 in). Her barbettes had from 40.0 to 29.8 centimetres (15.75 to 11.75 in) of armor, while her gun shields had 7.94 centimetres (3.125 in), her conning tower 15.56 centimetres (6.125 in), and her deck 7.0 to 5.1 centimetres (2.75 to 2 in). Internally, she had French-style cellular construction with 13 watertight bulkheads and a double bottom.

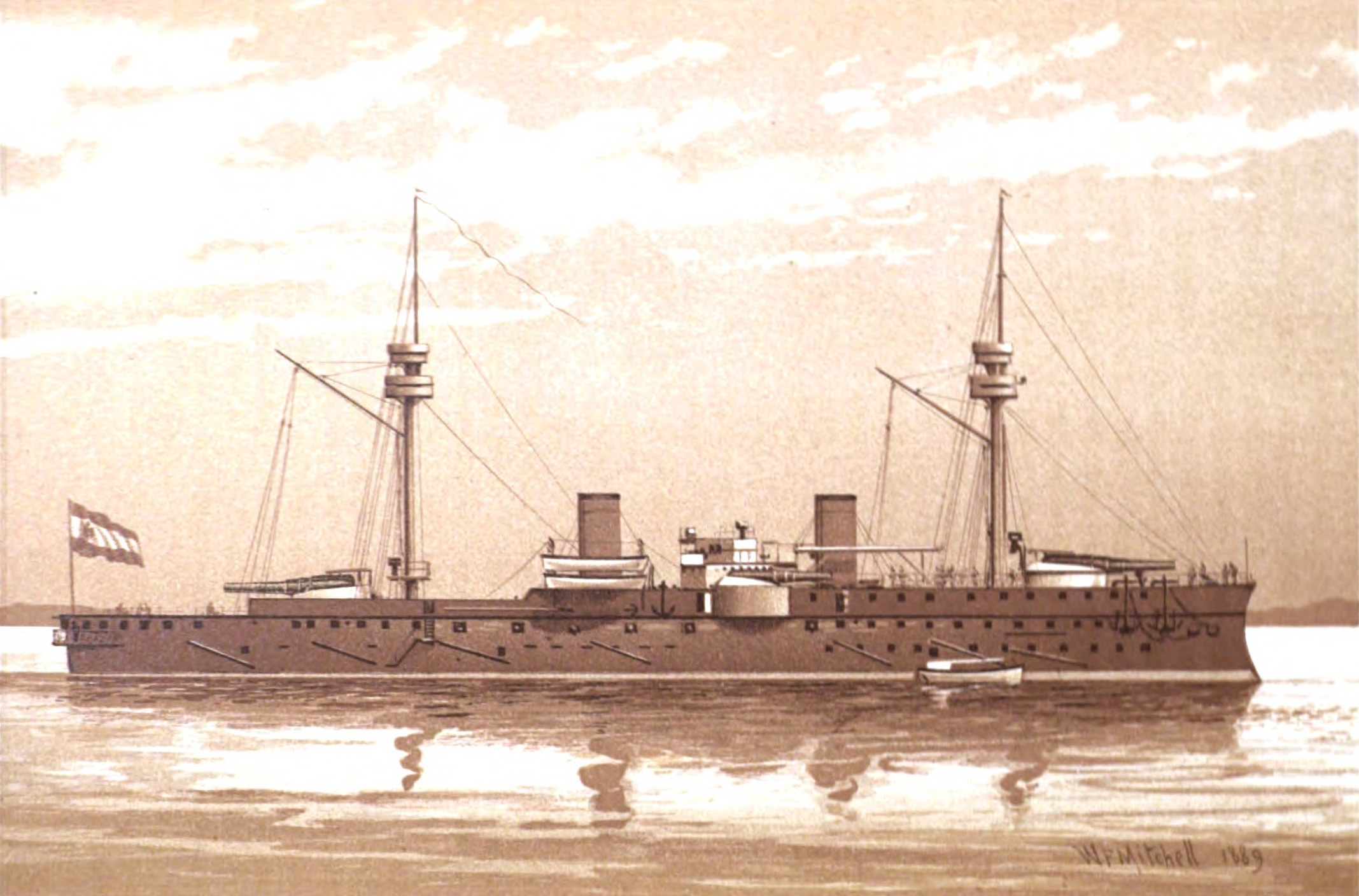
Pelayo. (Illustration from the 1888–1889 edition of Brassey's Naval Annual)

Pelayo was originally intended to be the first of a new class of battleships, but a crisis with the German Empire in the Caroline Islands in 1890 led to the cancellation of these plans and the diversion of funds to the construction of the Infanta Maria Teresa-class armored cruisers. Pelayo was viewed as too slow and having too little steaming endurance for colonial service; moreover, battleship designers abandoned the barbette ship concept in the 1890s, and she ended up as the only member of her class.

The ship was the only battleship in the Spanish fleet until the entry into service of the dreadnought battleship España in 1914, and her unique design and capabilities made it difficult for the Spanish Navy to plan for her tactical employment, as she had no capital ships of similar capabilities with which to operate. During her operational life, the Spanish Navy made plans to organize a division made up of Pelayo and the old armored frigates Numancia and Vitoria, but the armored frigates were old and in poor condition, and the plans were dropped. After Spain began to commission her first dreadnoughts in 1914, the Spanish Navy planned to organize a division around Pelayo, but by then Pelayo herself was too old and in too poor of a condition, and these plans also were scrapped. As a result of her unique design and the difficulty of operating her with other ships, the Spanish Navy nicknamed her "Solitario", meaning "The Individualist," "The Solitary One," or "The Lonely One."

Pelayo was reconstructed at La Seyne-sur-Mer in 1897–1898, receiving armor for her midships battery and having her 16-and-12-centimetre (6.3 and 4.7 in) guns replaced by 14-centimetre (5.5 in) pieces, one mounted as a bow chaser and the rest on the broadside. However, the installation of these new guns was disrupted and delayed when she was rushed back into service after the Spanish–American War began. During a major refit in 1910, her torpedo tubes were removed.

== Construction and commissioning ==
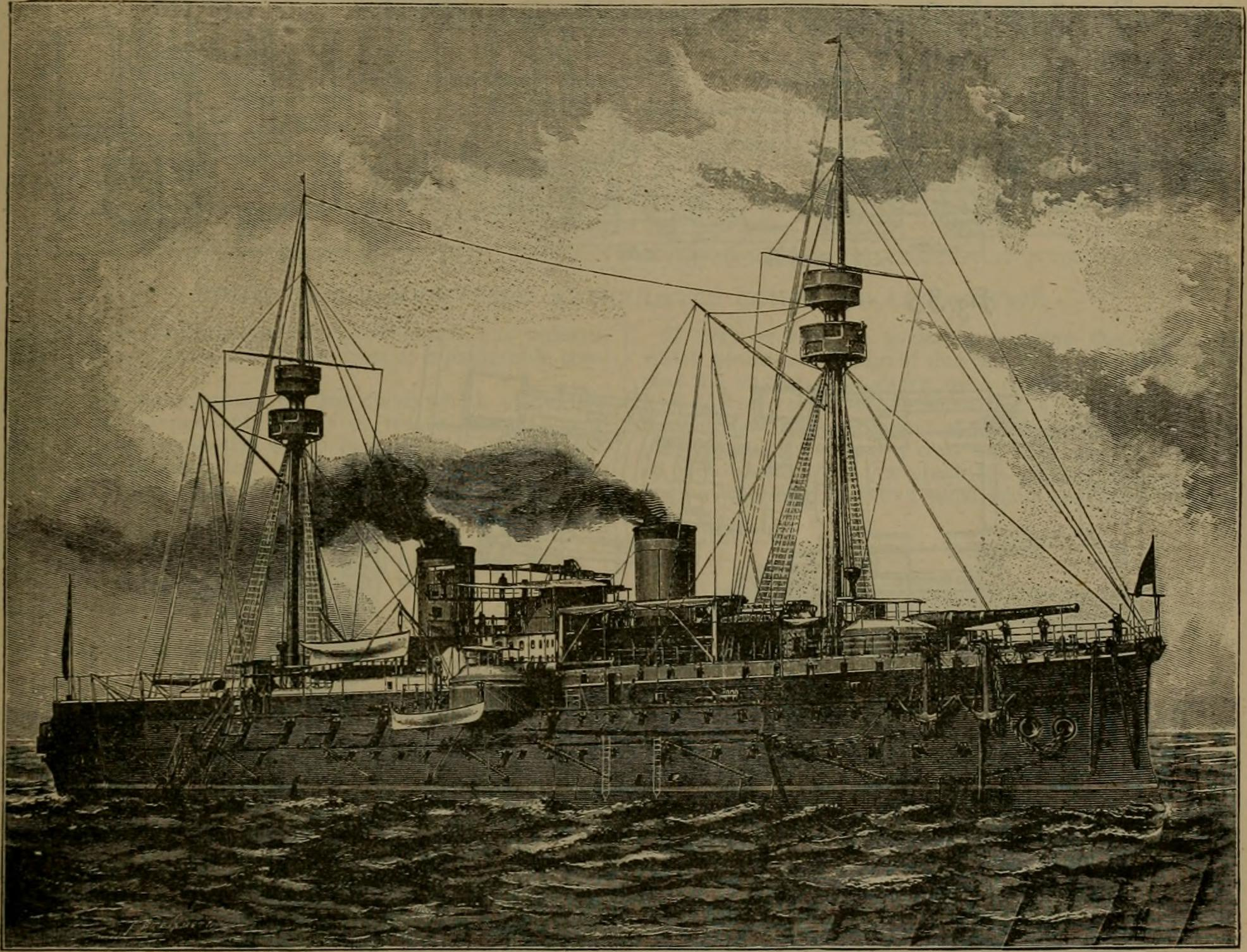
Pelayo.(Illustration from The Railroad and Engineering Journal, 1887)

In 1884 the Spanish Minister of the Navy, Contralmirante (Counter Admiral) Juan Bautista Antequera y Bobadilla, submitted a proposal for the construction of several battleships to the Cortes Generales, which authorized the construction of only one of them, the future Pelayo. During 1884, the Spanish government contacted several shipyards about constructing the ship. King Alfonso XII approved the construction on 23 June 1884, and in Marseille, France, on 28 June the Spanish government signed a contract for her construction with the French shipyard Forges et Chantiers de la Mediterranée. The order for her construction was placed on 12 November 1884, and her keel was laid at La Seyne-sur-Mer, France, in either April 1885 or February 1886, according to different sources.

Pelayo was launched on 5 February 1887 with Minister of the Navy Rafael Rodríguez de Arias Villavicencio, the Bishop of Toulon, and the Spanish Navy screw frigate Blanca in attendance. She was completed on 3 June 1888 and handed over to the Spanish Navy at Toulon, France, on 8 September 1888 in the presence of the Spanish Navy's Training Squadron, made up of the armoured frigate Numancia and the unprotected cruisers Castilla and Isla de Luzón. She entered service without her main guns.

== Operational history ==
=== 1888–1898 ===
c. 1897 painting of Pelayo

Under the command of Ship-of-the-Line Captain Pascual Cervera y Topete, who had supervised her construction, Pelayo made her delivery voyage late in 1888. She received her battle ensign, donated by Asturias and embroidered in Gijón. She returned to Toulon in January 1889 for modifications and improvements. After their completion, she returned to Spain in September 1889 and was assigned to the Training Squadron.

In September 1889, clashes occurred between Spanish forces and Moroccans over attacks on and the capture of a number of warships and merchant ships in Moroccan waters. The Training Squadron departed Cádiz and proceeded to Al Hoceima on the coast of Morocco on 23 September 1889, joining Isla de Luzón and the screw frigate Gerona there. The Training Squadron′s commander, Contralmirante (Counter Admiral) Carranza, considered making Pelayo his flagship, but Pelayo′s commanding officer, Cervera, opposed it because he viewed Pelayo as unworthy of the role because she still lacked her main guns, so Carranza instead hoisted his flag aboard Gerona. The unprotected cruiser Navarra arrived at Al Hoceima from Tangier with emissaries from Sultan Hassan I of Morocco to negotiate the release of prisoners from the captured fishing vessel Miguel y Teresa.

In December 1889, Pelayo encountered a severe storm in the Gulf of Lion which forced her to remain off Marseille without entering port. She finally put in at Mahón on Menorca in the Balearic Islands with minor damage. In April 1890, she returned to Toulon to have her main guns installed. The President of France, Sadi Carnot, visited her on 19 April 1890 during her stay in Toulon.

In the spring of 1891, Pelayo was part of a Spanish Navy squadron which also included Isla de Luzón, the protected cruiser Reina Regente, and the torpedo gunboat Destructor that visited Piraeus, Greece, and received a visit there from King George I and Queen Olga of Greece. On 1 August 1891 the Spanish Minister of the Navy, José María Beránger Ruiz de Apodaca, visited Pelayo at Ferrol. On 12 August 1891, Pelayo and other Spanish warships docked at San Sebastián, the summer resort of Spanish monarchs, where she received a visit by Queen Regent Maria Christina. Pelayo returned to Ferrol on 20 August 1891.

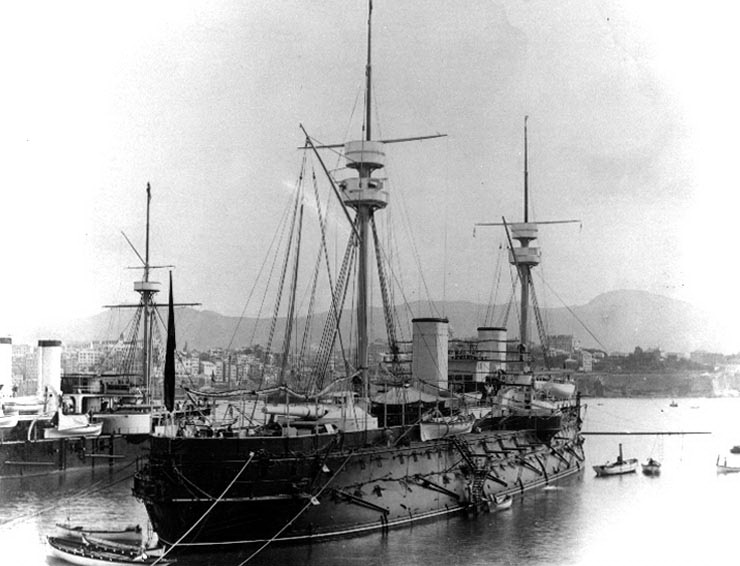
Pelayo at Genoa, Italy, in 1892.

In 1892, Pelayo participated in events commemorating the 400th anniversary of Christopher Columbus′s discovery of the Americas, beginning with a visit to Genoa, Italy, on 4 September 1892 as part of a Spanish squadron that also included Reina Regente, the unprotected cruiser Alfonso XII, the armored frigate Vitoria, and the torpedo gunboat Temerario. She was at Huelva, Spain, for the next event, in which Maria Christina and her son, King Alfonso XIII, boarded the unprotected cruiser Conde de Venadito at Cádiz on 10 October 1892 and, after arriving at Huelva, inspected a Spanish Navy squadron that positioned itself in two parallel lines, with Reina Regente and Vitoria among the ships to port of Conde de Venadito and Pelayo and Alfonso XII among those to starboard of her. After the inspection, the fleet proceeded to Cádiz.

In late August 1893, Pelayo joined Alfonso XII, Reina Regente, the unprotected cruiser Isla de Cuba, and the torpedo boats Barceló, Habana, and Rigel in conducting simulated torpedo-firing maneuvers off Santa Pola. More maneuvers began when the Training Squadron departed Cartagena on 15 October and anchored at Santa Pola on 16 October. Subsequently, the ships simulated a battle off Alicante, in which a division made up of Pelayo, Isla de Cuba, Barceló, Rigel, the unprotected cruiser Reina Mercedes, and the torpedo boat Rayo opposed a division composed of Alfonso XII, Reina Regente, Destructor, and Habana and the torpedo boat Ariete, later joined by Conde de Venadito. The maneuvers, which also included other combat actions, an amphibious landing, and a final naval review, were scheduled to conclude on 22 October 1893. However, in September 1893, Riffians in Morocco began attacks on Spanish positions near the Spanish enclave of Melilla on the coast of North Africa, beginning the first Melillan campaign. The Training Squadron interrupted its maneuvers to proceed to the North African coast and intervene. Several more warships reinforced the squadron in late November 1893, when the squadron's operations concluded with the arrival at Melilla of troops under General Arsenio Martínez Campos.

In 1895, Pelayo, the armored cruiser Infanta Maria Teresa, and the unprotected cruiser Marqués de la Ensenada represented Spain at the inauguration of the Kiel Canal, which connected the North Sea with the Baltic Sea. Squadrons of several other countries also assembled at Kiel in the German Empire for the ceremonies, which took place on 20 and 21 June. After returning from Germany, Pelayo, Alfonso XII, Marqués de la Ensenada, and the armored cruiser Vizcaya arrived at Tangier on 12 July 1895 to place pressure on Sultan Abdelaziz to put an end to unrest in Morocco. Once the situation in Morocco had calmed, the ships returned to Spain, arriving at Algeciras on 17 August 1895.

In 1896, Pelayo continued to operate as part of the Training Squadron, which in January also included Infanta María Teresa, Vizcaya, and the armored cruiser Almirante Oquendo. She called at Barcelona from 17 June to 19 July. On 29 November 1896 she arrived at La Seyne-sur-Mer, France, for a reconstruction which included replacement of her boilers with lighter and more efficient Niclausse boilers to give her a greater steaming range. Her 16-centimetre (6.3 in) and 12-centimetre (4.7 in) Hontoria guns were replaced with nine 14-centimetre (5.5 in) Schneider-Canet quick-firing guns, one as a bow chaser and four on either beam. Her upper crow's nests were removed. The weight saved through the installation of her new boilers also allowed her previously unarmored secondary battery area to be armored with 7 centimetres (2.8 in) of steel plate. She achieved 16 knots (30 km/h; 18 mph) after the reconstruction.

=== Spanish-American War ===
Amid increasing tensions with the United States in early 1898, the Ministry of the Navy ordered Pelayo to return to Spain to avoid internment by neutral France in the event war broke out. Although her reconstruction was not yet complete — her old 16-and-12-centimetre (6.3 and 4.7 in) guns had been removed but her new 14-centimetre (5.5 in) guns had not yet been mounted — Pelayo got underway from La Seyne-sur-Mer on 7 April 1898 and returned to Spain. The Spanish–American War broke out with the U.S. declaration of war on Spain on 25 April 1898, the United States stipulating that the declaration was retroactive to 21 April. Pelayo was rushed back into service despite her incomplete state and was assigned to the Reserve Squadron on 14 May 1898, making up a division of the squadron that also included the armored frigate Vitoria and the destroyers Audaz, Osado, and Proserpina. Although Minister of the Navy Ramón Auñón y Villalón envisioned a campaign in which the Reserve Squadron would attack the coast of the United States and interdict U.S. maritime traffic between Halifax, Nova Scotia, Canada, and Cape San Roque, Brazil, the squadron instead remained idle at Cádiz for a month with a nominal responsibility of guarding the Spanish coast against United States Navy raids while the Ministry of the Navy decided how best to employ it. She then was assigned to the 2nd Squadron, commanded by Contralmirante (Counter Admiral) Manuel de Cámara y Libermoore; Cámara was ordered to steam to the Philippines and defeat the U.S. Navy's Asiatic Squadron, which had controlled Philippine waters since destroying the Spanish Navy Pacific Squadron of Contralmirante (Counter Admiral) Patricio Montojo y Pasaron in the Battle of Manila Bay on 1 May.

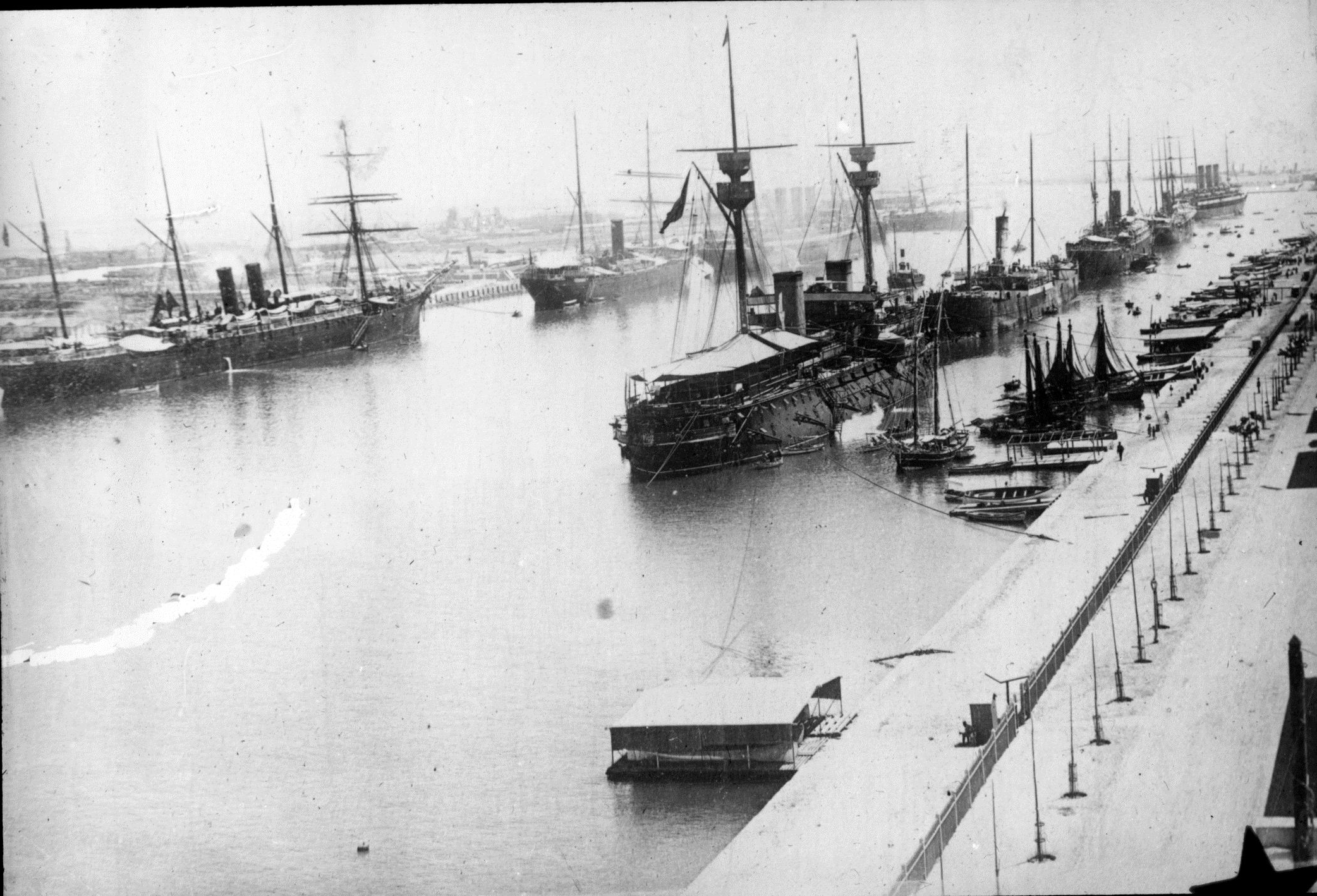
Cámara's squadron in the Suez Canal in 1898. Pelayo is in the foreground.

Cámara's squadron — consisting of Pelayo, the new armored cruiser Emperador Carlos V, the auxiliary cruisers Patriota and Rapido, the destroyers Audaz, Osado, and Proserpina, and the transports Buenos Aires and Panay — sortied from Cádiz on 16 June 1898 and passed Gibraltar on 17 June 1898. It arrived at Port Said, Egypt — where the destroyers were scheduled to part company with the squadron and return to Spain — on 26 June 1898 and requested permission to transship coal, which the British government, which controlled Egypt at the time, finally denied on 30 June 1898 out of concern that it would violate British and Egyptian neutrality. Cámara's squadron began its southward transit of the Suez Canal on 4 July, and by the time it arrived at Suez on 5 July 1898, the squadron of Viceadmiral (Vice Admiral) Pascual Cervera y Topete had been annihilated in the Battle of Santiago de Cuba off southeastern Cuba on 3 July, freeing up the U.S. Navy's heavy forces from the blockade of Santiago de Cuba. Fearful for the security of the Spanish coast, the Spanish Ministry of the Navy recalled Cámara's squadron as it steamed through the Red Sea on 7 July 1898, and it returned to Spain, making stops at Mahón on Menorca in the Balearic Islands on 18 July and at Cartagena on either 20 or 23 July, according to different sources, before arriving at Cadiz, where it was dissolved on 25 July 1898.

Pelayo spent the last three weeks of the war in Spanish waters, and hostilities ended on 16 August 1898 without her having a chance to see combat. Some historians have argued that had Pelayo and Emperador Carlos V participated directly in the conflict, the course of the war would have been altered dramatically and possibly led to a Spanish victory, thus retaining Spain's status as a colonial power.

=== 1899–1909 ===
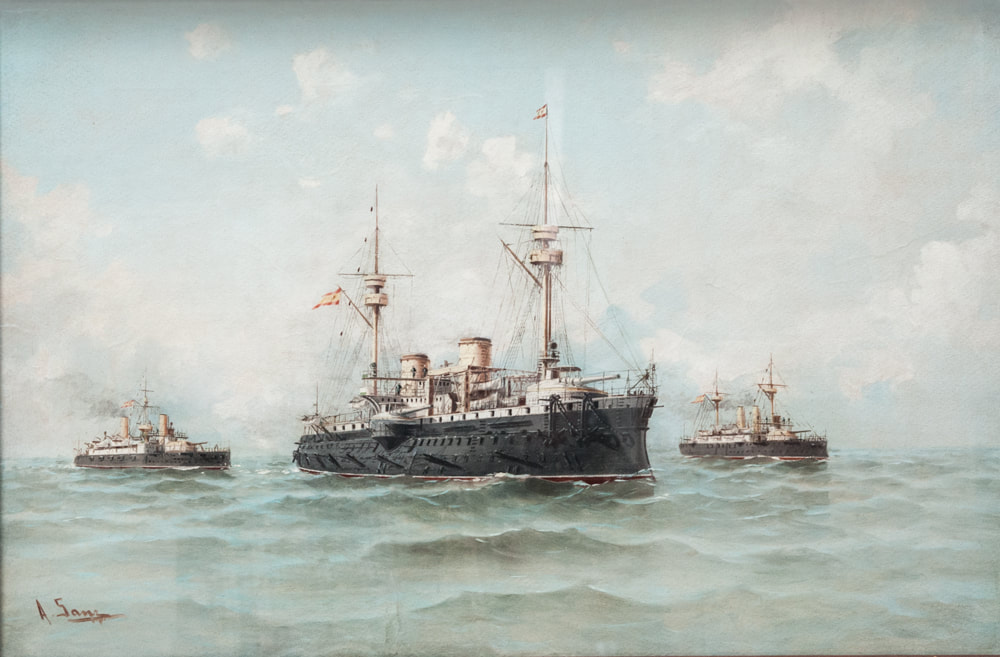
Painting of Pelayo (centre), ca. 1899

On 12 February 1899, Pelayo returned to La Seyne-sur-Mer to complete her reconstruction. After its completion in October 1899, she returned to Spain, where she underwent additional minor modifications and received new smaller-caliber guns in the form of twelve 57-millimetre (2.2 in) Nordenfelt guns, five 37-millimetre (1.5 in) Hotchkiss revolvers, and six 37-millimetre (1.5 in) Maxim automatic guns.

In 1901, Pelayo resumed her representation missions, attending a naval review at Toulon. In 1902 she steamed to the Cantabrian Sea, transporting the Spanish royal family to Bilbao and remaining at San Sebastián during August 1902. In April 1903, she visited Lisbon, Portugal, for a naval review, and on 22 June 1903 she was at Cartagena along with Emperador Carlos V, Audaz, the protected cruiser Extremadura, the armored cruisers Cardenal Cisneros and Princesa de Asturias, and the coastal defense ship Numancia to host the British and French fleets as they attended King Alfonso XIII during his visit to the city. In 1904, she was at Vigo during a meeting there between King Alfonso XIII and Emperor Wilhelm II of Germany in which they discussed the status of Morocco, among other things, and she took part in a naval review in Vigo Bay.

In April 1904, wireless telegraphy antennas manufactured by the German company Telefunken were installed experimentally aboard Pelayo, Extremadura, and the royal yacht Giralda and the ships conducted wireless tests in the Mediterranean Sea during the summer of 1904. These included an exchange between Pelayo and Extremadura at Mahón on 28 July 1904 in which Pelayo sent the first radiogram.

Between late September and mid-October 1904, Pelayo carried out maneuvers with the protected cruiser Río de la Plata, Audaz, and the gunboat Álvaro de Bazán in the Cantabrian Sea off the north coast of Spain. The ships then proceeded to the waters off Galicia, where they conducted more maneuvers with the Training Squadron during the first week of November 1904.

On 13 January 1905, Pelayo, Cardenal Cisneros, Emperador Carlos V, Princesa de Asturias, Extremadura, Río de la Plata, and the unprotected cruiser Infanta Isabel formed a squadron at Cádiz to receive the Duke and Duchess of Connaught and Strathearn, Prince Arthur and Princess Louise Margaret, as they arrived there aboard the Royal Navy armoured cruiser HMS Essex. On the afternoon of 30 November 1905, Pelayo anchored at Cartagena with the gunboat Vicente Yáñez Pinzón.

As part of the Training Squadron, Pelayo, Emperador Carlos V, Princesa de Asturias, and Río de la Plata departed Cartagena on 16 March 1906 and steamed to Cádiz, where other ships of the squadron joined them. On 23 March 1906 the Training Squadron got underway from Cádiz in two divisions — one consisting of Princesa de Asturias, Emperador Carlos V, and Osado and the other of Pelayo, Río de la Plata, and Extremadura. The squadron rendezvoused with Giralda and the Compañía Transatlántica Española passenger steamer Alfonso XII, the latter with the Spanish royal family and Minister of the Navy Víctor María Concas Palau aboard. They then escorted King Alfonso XIII on his visit to the Canary Islands, arriving at Tenerife on 26 March, at Las Palmas on 30 March, at Santa Cruz de la Palma on 3 April, and at Hierro Island on 4 April 1906. Alfonso XIII and the squadron returned to Cádiz on 7 April 1906.

On 2 November 1906 Pelayo, Emperador Carlos V, Princesa de Asturias, and the gunboat Doña María de Molina arrived from Cádiz at Málaga, where they rendezvoused with Extremadura, Río de la Plata, and Osado. The ships were at Málaga for the visit there of King Alfonso XIII and Queen Victoria Eugenie on 3 November.

Pelayo, Princesa de Asturias, Extremadura, Numancia, and the protected cruiser Lepanto attended a meeting between King Alfonso XIII and King Edward VII of the United Kingdom, which took place in Cartagena's harbor from 8 to 10 April 1907 along with a simultaneous meeting between Minister of the Navy José Ferrándiz y Niño and British First Sea Lord John Fisher. In late June 1907, Pelayo participated in naval maneuvers off the coast of Galicia. After completing gunnery exercises, she anchored at Vigo, where she formed a division with Osado and Proserpina under the command of Pelayo′s commanding officer, and the division engaged in mock combat against Extremadura, Princesa de Asturias, and Rio de la Plata. In July 1907 she cruised in the Cantabrian Sea as part of the Training Squadron before returning to Ferrol in early September 1907. After loading coal, water, and provisions, Pelayo, Princesa de Asturias, and Proserpina got underway from Ferrol on 10 September 1907, for Cádiz. They unloaded guns and supplies at Cádiz, then departed for the waters off Morocco. Pelayo subsequently made several voyages along the Moroccan coast before anchoring at Barcelona in mid-October 1908 with several ships from the Training Squadron. On 21 October 1908, a French Navy squadron arrived there, and both squadrons remained in port during the stay at Barcelona of King Alfonso XIII and Queen Victoria Eugenie.

The second Melillan campaign, which pitted Spanish forces against Rifians in northern Morocco, began in July 1909. Pelayo deployed to the Moroccan coast where she carried out patrols, supported Spanish Army operations ashore, and conducted bombardments of Rifian positions, the first time she had fired her guns in anger. The campaign came to a close in December 1909.

=== 1910–1924 ===
Profile of Pelayo with her appearance in 1910.

Pelayo underwent a major refit in 1910 which included the removal of her torpedo tubes. After the Kert campaign began in Morocco in August 1911, Pelayo again deployed to Moroccan waters, departing Cádiz on 9 September and stopping at Tangier before arriving at Melilla. She subsequently bombarded enemy positions near Al Hoceima. She visited Málaga to coal on 18 September before anchoring at Melilla again on 23 September. She again arrived at Málaga on 1 October 1911 and embarked the Minister of War, Agustín de Luque y Coca, for a visit to the Chafarinas Islands. After a stopover at Melilla, she reached the Chafarinas Islands on 10 October. She returned to Spain at Cádiz on 22 October 1911. She returned to Moroccan waters and supported Spanish Army operations through the end of 1911, conducting several bombardments of enemy positions.

On 29 January 1912, Pelayo left Cádiz in company with Emperador Carlos V, Audaz, and Osado bound for the Bay of Gibraltar. On 30 January she proceeded to Gibraltar to greet the British monarchs — King George V and Queen Mary — on their return journey from India. On 5 February 1912, she was at Ferrol with the same ships to attend the launching of the dreadnought battleship España. As fighting in the Kert campaign intensified, Pelayo returned to operations off Morocco. She conducted a simulated amphibious landing in Melilla to distract the Kabyles, who were making heavy attacks against Spanish Army positions around Melilla. The Kert campaign concluded in May 1912.

On the night of 22–23 November 1912, Pelayo suffered serious damage when she ran aground due to a navigational error in Fonduko Bay near Mahón on Menorca in the Balearic Islands while arriving from Palma de Mallorca on Mallorca carrying ammunition. She proceeded to Cartagena, where she arrived on 28 November for repairs.

Pelayo returned to the North African coast in 1913, where in June she joined Emperador Carlos V and the protected cruiser Reina Regente in conducting shore bombardments along the coast of Spanish Morocco in the area between Ksar es-Seghir and Cape Malabata. In October 1913, Pelayo, España, Emperador Carlos V, Princesa de Asturias, Reina Regente, Río de la Plata, Extremadura, Audaz, Osado, and Proserpina were at Cartagena during a meeting there between King Alfonso XIII and President of France Raymond Poincaré aboard the royal yacht Giralda. On 26 December 1913 Pelayo, Extremadura, Proserpina, and the gunboat Lauria stood by a British ship that was aground near Ceuta on the coast of North Africa to deter attacks on the ship.

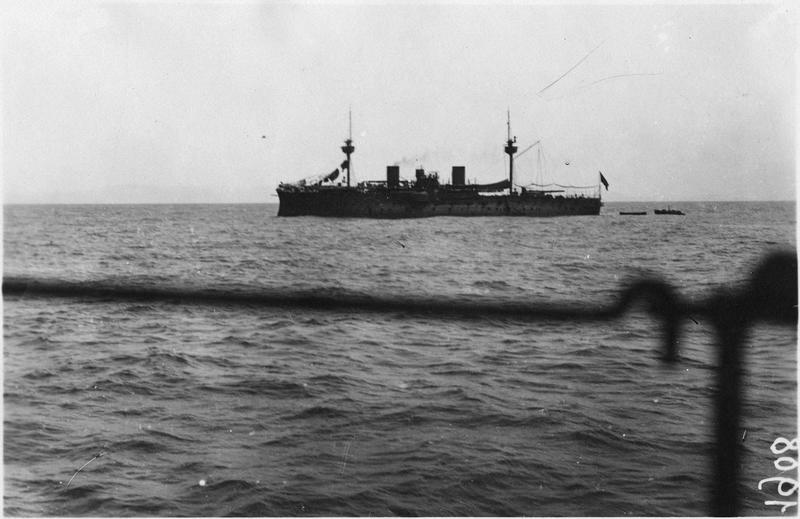
Pelayo in the harbor at Tangier on 24 May 1916.

Spain remained neutral during World War I, which began late in July 1914 while Pelayo was stationed at Palma de Mallorca in the Balearic Islands with four torpedo boats. On 29 June 1916, she joined the gunboats Bonifaz and Álvaro de Bazán in bombarding several enemy positions in Morocco. In January 1917 a French merchant ship collided with her and damaged her bow while she was visiting Tangier. Her commanding officer died of a heart attack on 28 November 1917 while she was at Tangier.

Profile of Pelayo with her appearance in 1920.

Pelayo was detached from the Training Squadron in 1918, and from June 1919 she served as a school for apprentice sailors at Ferrol. She served as a gunnery training ship in 1920 and 1921. On 3 August 1922 she was ordered decommissioned, but she remained in commission for two more years.

== Final disposition ==
Pelayo was disarmed in 1923 and decommissioned on 1 August 1924. She was sold to a company in the Netherlands for scrapping. She left Ferrol on 26 April 1926 bound for Rotterdam, where she was scrapped.

== Bibliography ==
- Cervera y Topete, Pascual. Office of Naval Intelligence War Notes No. VII: Information From Abroad: The Spanish–American War: A Collection of Documents Relative to the Squadron Operations in the West Indies, Translated From the Spanish. Washington, D.C.: Government Printing Office, 1899.
- Gibbons, Tony. The Complete Encyclopedia of Battleships and Battlecruisers: A Technical Directory of All the World's Capital Ships From 1860 to the Present Day. London: Salamander Books, Ltd., 1983.
- Gray, Randal, Ed. Conway's All The World's Fighting Ships 1906–1921. Annapolis, Maryland: Naval Institute Press, 1985. ISBN 0-87021-907-3.
- Nofi, Albert A. The Spanish–American War, 1898. Conshohocken, Pennsylvania:Combined Books, Inc., 1996. ISBN 0-938289-57-8.
- Lyon, Hugh (1979). "Spain". In Gardiner, Robert (ed.). Conway's All the World's Fighting Ships 1860–1905. Greenwich: Conway Maritime Press. pp. 380–386. ISBN 0-8317-0302-4.
- Pastor y Fernandez de Checa, M. (1977). "The Spanish Ironclads Numancia, Vitoria and Pelayo, Pt. III". F. P. D. S. Newsletter. V (4): 25–28. OCLC 41554533.
- Warship International Staff (2015). "International Fleet Review at the Opening of the Kiel Canal, 20 June 1895". Warship International. LII (3): 255–263. ISSN 0043-0374.
