= Manuel de la Cámara =

Spanish admiral (1836-1920)

- Born: 7 May 1836; Málaga, Province of Málaga, Spain
- Died: 4 January 1920 (aged 83); Málaga, Province of Málaga, Spain
- Burial place: Cemetery of San Miguel, Málaga, Province of Málaga, Spain
- Military career
- Allegiance: Spain
- Branch: Spanish Navy
- Service years: 1852–1903
- Rank: Almirante
- Commands: Cristina; Juanita; Spanish Marine Corps; Prueba; Cuba Española; Don Álvaro de Bazán; Favorita; Africa; Tornado; Reina Mercedes; Castilla; Philippine Division; Navarra; Reserve Squadron; Second Squadron; Instructional Squadron
- Conflicts: Hispano-Moroccan War; Mexican intervention; Chincha Islands War; Battle of Abtao; Bombardment of Valparaiso; Battle of Callao; Ten Years War; First Rif War; Spanish–American War
- Awards: Cross of Naval Merit First Class (two awards); Cross of Military Merit; Grand Cross of the Order of Charles III; Royal and Military Order of Saint Hermenegild; Grand Cross of the Order of Naval Merit with white insignia; Grand Cross of the Royal and Military Order of Saint Hermenegild; Honorary assistant of the Military House of S.M. King D. Alfonso XIII

Admiral Manuel de la Cámara y Livermoore (or Libermoore) (7 May 1836 – 4 January 1920) was a Spanish naval officer. He saw service in many of Spain′s wars of the second half of the nineteenth century and is most notable for commanding a large naval squadron that made an abortive attempt to relieve Spanish forces in the Philippine Islands during the Spanish–American War.

== Early life ==
Cámara was born at Málaga, Spain, on 7 May 1836 (Note: Some sources claim Cámara was born a year earlier, on 7 May 1835; see, for example, The Encyclopedia of the Spanish–American and Philippine–American Wars, Santa Barbara, California: ABC-CLIO LLC, 2009, ISBN 978-1-85109-951-1, p. 85. One source places his birth on 30 May 1835 and his baptism on that day as well (see geneatnet.org Manuel de la Cámara Livermore Family Tree by Fernando Francisco).) into a family of merchants. His father was a Spanish merchant mariner and sea captain, and his mother was English. He had five brothers and six sisters.

Having an English mother, Cámara learned English in childhood. After schooling in Málaga, he entered the Spanish naval academy in San Fernando in July 1850. He completed his course of study there in 1852.

Tragedy struck the Cámara family on 28 March 1856 when one of Cámara′s sisters, Matilde de la Cámara Livermore, who had boarded the Spanish steamship Miño in Liverpool, England, for a voyage to Barcelona, Spain, was among 94 people who drowned when Miño sank in the Strait of Gibraltar off Tarifa, Spain, after colliding with the British transport ship Minden. (Note: Only 21 of the 115 people aboard Miño survived the sinking.)

== Naval career ==
=== Early career ===
After graduation from the naval academy, Cámara entered the Spanish Navy as a midshipman at Cádiz in 1852 and made a cruise aboard a training ship with his fellow midshipmen before he was commissioned as an officer in the Spanish Navy with the rank of alférez de fragata or "frigate ensign," the lower of the Spanish Navy′s two ensign ranks. During the years between 1852 and 1858, he had duty in the waters of the Iberian Peninsula and the Antilles. In July 1858, he was promoted to alférez de navío or "ship-of-the-line ensign," the higher of the Spanish Navy′s two ensign ranks, and was assigned to the Maritime Department of Havana. In subsequent years he saw duty aboard the paddle steamers Isabel II and Pizarro, the screw frigate Petronila, the vessel Valdés, and the paddle steamers Isabel la Católica, Francisco de Asís, and Antonio Ulloa, served as interim commanding officer of the schooners Cristina and Juanita, and took part in the Hispano-Moroccan War of 1859–1860, in which his superiors noted that he displayed fine qualities as an officer.

In 1861, Spain concluded the Convention of London with France and the United Kingdom, in which the three powers agreed to set up a naval blockade of Mexico in the Gulf of Mexico and occupy Veracruz to force Mexico to repay its loans. Cámara went to the Gulf of Mexico in 1862 for service in the blockade, during which he served on the general staff of French Navy Vice Admiral Edmond Jurien de La Gravière. Cámara returned to Spain in 1863 and was assigned to duty aboard the paddle steamer Piles, based at Cádiz.

=== Chincha Islands War ===
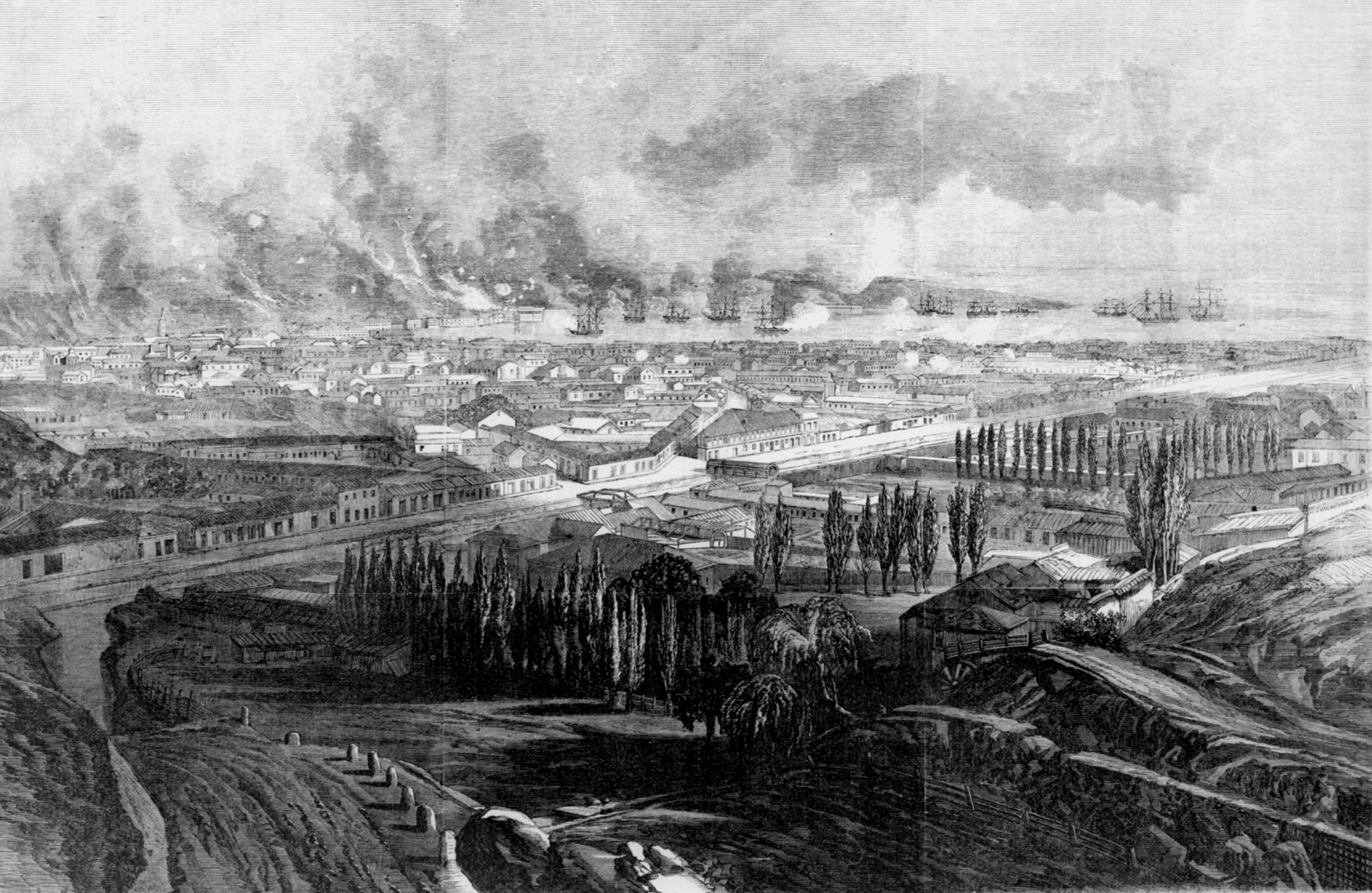
The Spanish fleet bombards Valparaíso, Chile, on 31 March 1866.

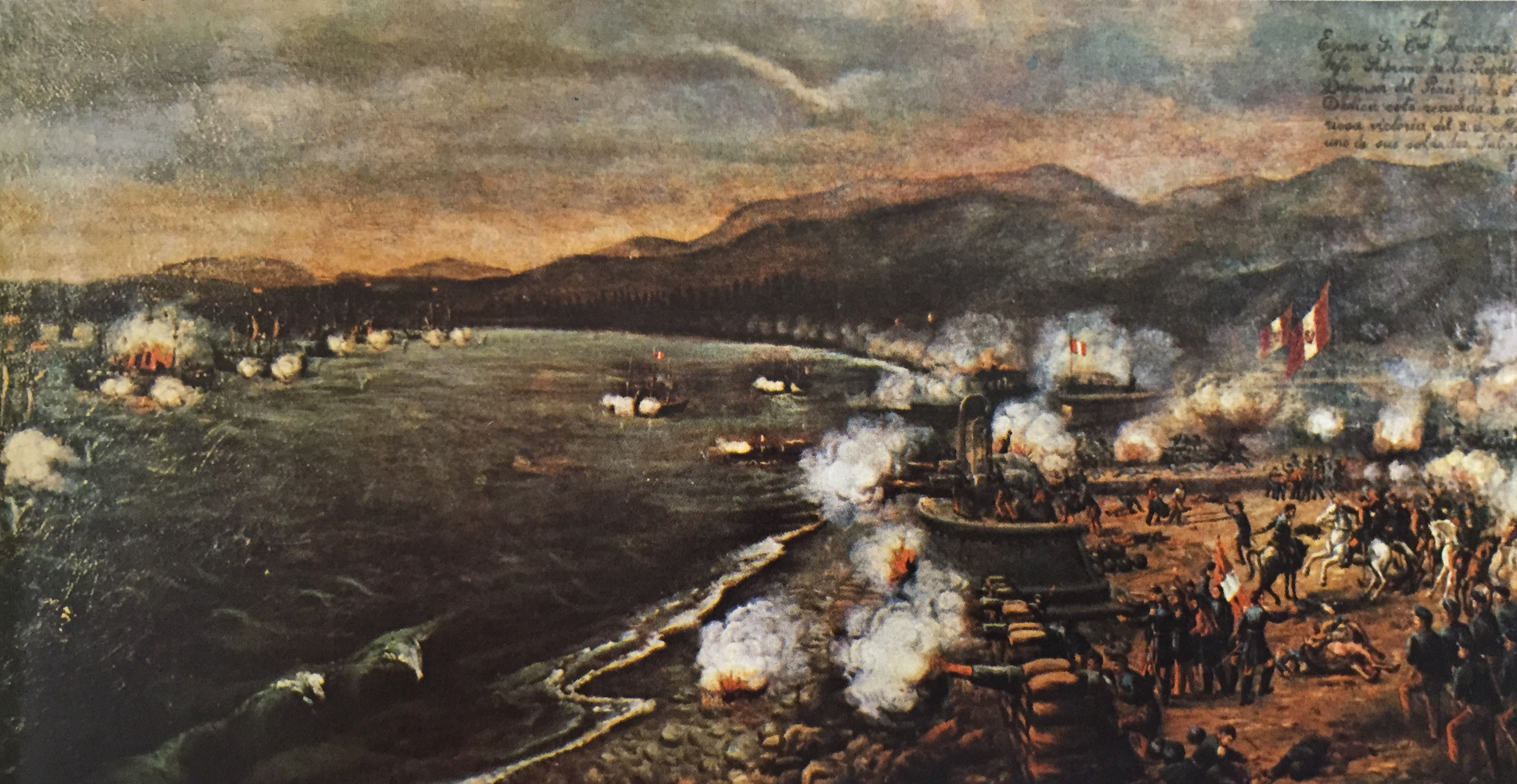
An 1867 painting of the Battle of Callao on 2 May 1866.

In 1864, Cámara became sailing master aboard the screw corvette Vencedora in the Pacific Squadron. In that year, the Chincha Islands War with Peru — joined later by Bolivia, Chile, and Ecuador — broke out in the southeastern Pacific Ocean. Transferring to the more modern screw frigate Villa de Madrid to serve as her sailing master and navigator and promoted to teniente de navío (ship-of-the-line lieutenant) in 1865 while aboard Villa de Madrid, he saw action in many of the war′s major operations. During his tour aboard Villa de Madrid, the frigate took part in a blockade of Chile′s ports in 1866 and in the Battle of Abtao on 7 February 1866 at Abtao Island in Chile′s Chiloé Archipelago, in which Villa de Madrid and the Spanish frigate Reina Blanca displayed good marksmanship in what was otherwise an indecisive engagement with the Peruvian Navy frigate Apurímac and corvettes América and Unión and the Chilean Navy schooner Covadonga. Villa de Madrid also participated in the bombardment of Valparaíso, Chile, on 31 March 1866 and the blockade of the Chorrillos squadron in April 1866.

Aboard Villa de Madrid, Cámara took part in the lone major naval action of the Chincha Islands War, the Battle of Callao, in which the Spanish Navy squadron of Admiral Casto Méndez Núñez bombarded coastal fortifications at Callao, Peru, on 2 May 1866. After a 450-pound (204 kg) projectile hit Villa de Madrid, inflicting 35 casualties and destroying her boilers, Vencedora towed her out of danger, but Villa de Madrid fired over 200 rounds at the Peruvian fortifications during the maneuver. In command of a battery of guns on Villa de Madrid′s main deck, Cámara played an active and conspicuous role in the battle, the guns under his command firing until they ran out of ammunition. For his actions during the war, Cámara received the Cross of Naval Merit First Class and was appointed to the post of commander of the Spanish Marine Corps.

Misfortune again struck Cámara's family when Cámara's younger brother Ricardo de la Cámara Livermore, born in 1839, who also participated in the Chincha Islands War with the rank of alférez de navío, developed a psychological trauma diagnosed as "war neurosis" as a result of the conflict. It eventually developed into what was diagnosed as "senile dementia," leading to Ricardo′s admittance to a mental sanatorium.

After the Chincha Islands War ended in 1866, Cámara received rapid promotion. On 18 July 1867, he was appointed to the Spanish Navy commission to the United Kingdom in London, performing duty at the Spanish Embassy there. He then served successively aboard the ironclad armored frigates Vitoria and Arapiles. In 1868 he was promoted to teniente de navío de 1.ª clase (ship-of-the-line lieutenant 1st class) and began a tour in the Department of the Philippines in command of the gunboat Prueba. During his tour in command, Prueba supported the Hydrographic Commission of the Archipelago in conducting hydrographic surveys in the Philippines. In 1870, he relinquished command of Prueba and returned to Spain.

=== Ten Years' War ===
In 1872, Cámara was assigned to the Maritime Department of Havana in Cuba, where the Ten Years' War had broken out in 1868. In Cuban waters, he took command of the gunboat Cuba Española, patrolling the Cuban coast aboard her and assisting in the defense of Guantánamo against the Cuban rebel forces of Antonio Maceo Grajales, an action for which he received both the Cross of Military Merit and a second award of the Cross of Naval Merit. He also commanded the paddle steamer Don Álvaro de Bazán and the sloop-of-war Favorita during the war.

After the Spanish steam corvette Tornado captured the American sidewheel paddle steamer Virginius — which was transporting men, munitions, and supplies to Cuban rebels — off Cuba on 30 October 1873 and Spanish authorities subsequently executed many of her passengers and crew, the resulting crisis with the United States, known as the Virginius Affair, almost led to war. Spain eventually agreed to return Virginius to the United States. Cámara, in command of Favorita at the time, played a role in the final resolution of the affair, boarding the United States Navy steamer USS Despatch off Bahia Honda, Cuba, on 16 December 1873 and making arrangements with U.S. Navy Captain W. D. Whiting for Virginius′s return, which took place without incident the next day under Cámara′s supervision from aboard Favorita.

Promoted to capitán de fragata (frigate captain) in 1876, Cámara took command of the corvette Africa, but he was relieved of command because of complaints by Africa′s officers and was reprimanded by the captain general of the Department of Cartagena. When he relinquished command of Africa, however, the admiral commanding his squadron congratulated him on his tour in command of Africa. He then became the commanding officer of Tornado. Under his command, Tornado made several voyages between Spain and Morocco, transferring the minister plenipotentiary of Spain in Morocco and the staff of the Moroccan embassy in Spain.

In 1885, Cámara was appointed head of the Spanish Navy commission in the United States at Washington, D.C., serving as naval attaché at the Spanish embassy there. He held that position until January 1888. He then returned to Spain, and was promoted to capitán de navío (ship-of-the-line captain) in 1888. In his next assignments, he successively commanded the unprotected cruisers Reina Mercedes and Castilla.

=== 1890s ===
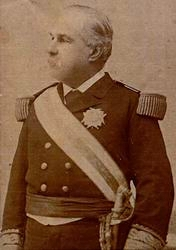
Cámara as a capitán de navío on 7 May 1890

On 7 March 1890, Cámara took command of the Philippine Division, a naval force composed of Castilla and the unprotected cruisers Don Antonio de Ulloa and Don Juan de Austria designated to reinforce the Spanish Navy′s squadron in the Philippines. The division departed Cádiz on 9 April 1890. Transiting the Mediterranean Sea, Suez Canal, and Indian Ocean, the division encountered heavy weather in the Gulf of Lyons, but otherwise enjoyed good weather during its voyage. It called at Barcelona, Port Said, Suez, Aden, and Colombo before arriving at Singapore on 2 June 1890. The three cruisers resumed their voyage the next day and arrived at Manila on 17 June 1890. In the Philippines, the division became known as the "Black Squadron" because its ships were painted black instead of white, as other Asiatic Squadron ships were. Although a ship-of-the-line captain, Cámara commanded the division with the title of "commodore" of the division until December 1890, when illness forced him to relinquish command.

Cámara returned to Spain in 1891. After regaining his health, he was assigned that year to the post of major general of the Maritime Department of Havana, serving concurrently as commander of the Antilles Squadron. He returned to Cádiz in 1892, where he took command of the unprotected cruiser Navarra. In 1893, he became port captain at Málaga, a position in his home town in which he hoped to have greater rest than he had found possible in his deployments over the previous years. However, the First Rif War broke out in Melilla in 1893, and the conflict made it necessary to send a large number of Spanish Army troops to Morocco. The Spanish Navy did not have enough ships to transport them all, so it ordered Cámara to organize their transportation. Cámara showed great skill in finding and hiring suitable ships in various Spanish ports, and received numerous commendations for his work during the war.

In April 1894, the month the First Rif War War ended, Cámara was promoted to capitán de navío de 1.ª clase (ship-of-the-line captain first class). In 1895 he was appointed head of the Spanish Navy commission to the United Kingdom in London, serving as naval attaché at the Spanish embassy there. In April 1897, he was promoted to contralmirante (counter admiral) and returned to Spain, where he became commander of the Reserve Squadron. He represented the Spanish Navy at the Diamond Jubilee of Queen Victoria in the United Kingdom in June 1897.

=== Spanish–American War ===
Shortly after the Spanish–American War began in April 1898, the Spanish Navy ordered major units of its fleet to concentrate at Cádiz to form the 2nd Squadron, under Cámara′s command. Two of Spain's most powerful warships, the battleship Pelayo and the brand-new armored cruiser Emperador Carlos V, were not available when the war began, the former undergoing reconstruction in a French shipyard and the latter not yet delivered from her builders. However, both were rushed into service and assigned to Cámara's squadron. One mission of the squadron, in the absence of any other direction, was to guard the Spanish coast against raids by the United States Navy.

During a meeting of senior Spanish naval officers in Madrid on 23 April 1898, Cámara voted with the majority to send the squadron of Vice Admiral Pascual Cervera y Topete to the Caribbean. Cervera's squadron duly arrived at Cuba, where it was blockaded in the harbor of Santiago de Cuba by the U.S. Navy's North Atlantic Squadron and Flying Squadron beginning on 27 May 1898. Meanwhile, the U.S. Navy's Asiatic Squadron under Commodore George Dewey had destroyed the Spanish Navy's squadron in the Philippine Islands under Rear Admiral Patricio Montojo y Pasaron in the Battle of Manila Bay on 1 May 1898.

Cámara's squadron lay idle at Cádiz while the Spanish Ministry of the Navy considered options for redressing the situation in the Caribbean and the Philippines. In late May 1898, Spanish Minister of the Navy Ramón Auñón y Villalón made plans for Cámara to take a squadron consisting of an armored cruiser, three auxiliary cruisers, and a dispatch boat across the Atlantic Ocean and bombard a city on the United States East Coast – preferably Charleston, South Carolina – after which the squadron was to head for the Caribbean and make port in Puerto Rico at San Juan or in Cuba at either Havana or Santiago de Cuba. Meanwhile, U.S. intelligence reported rumors as early as 15 May 1898 that Spain also was considering sending Cámara's squadron to the Philippines to destroy Dewey's squadron and reinforce the Spanish forces there with fresh troops. Pelayo and Emperador Carlos V each were individually more powerful than any of Dewey's ships, and the possibility of their arrival in the Philippines was of great concern to the United States, which hastily arranged to dispatch 10,000 additional U.S. Army troops to the Philippines and send two U.S. Navy monitors to reinforce Dewey.

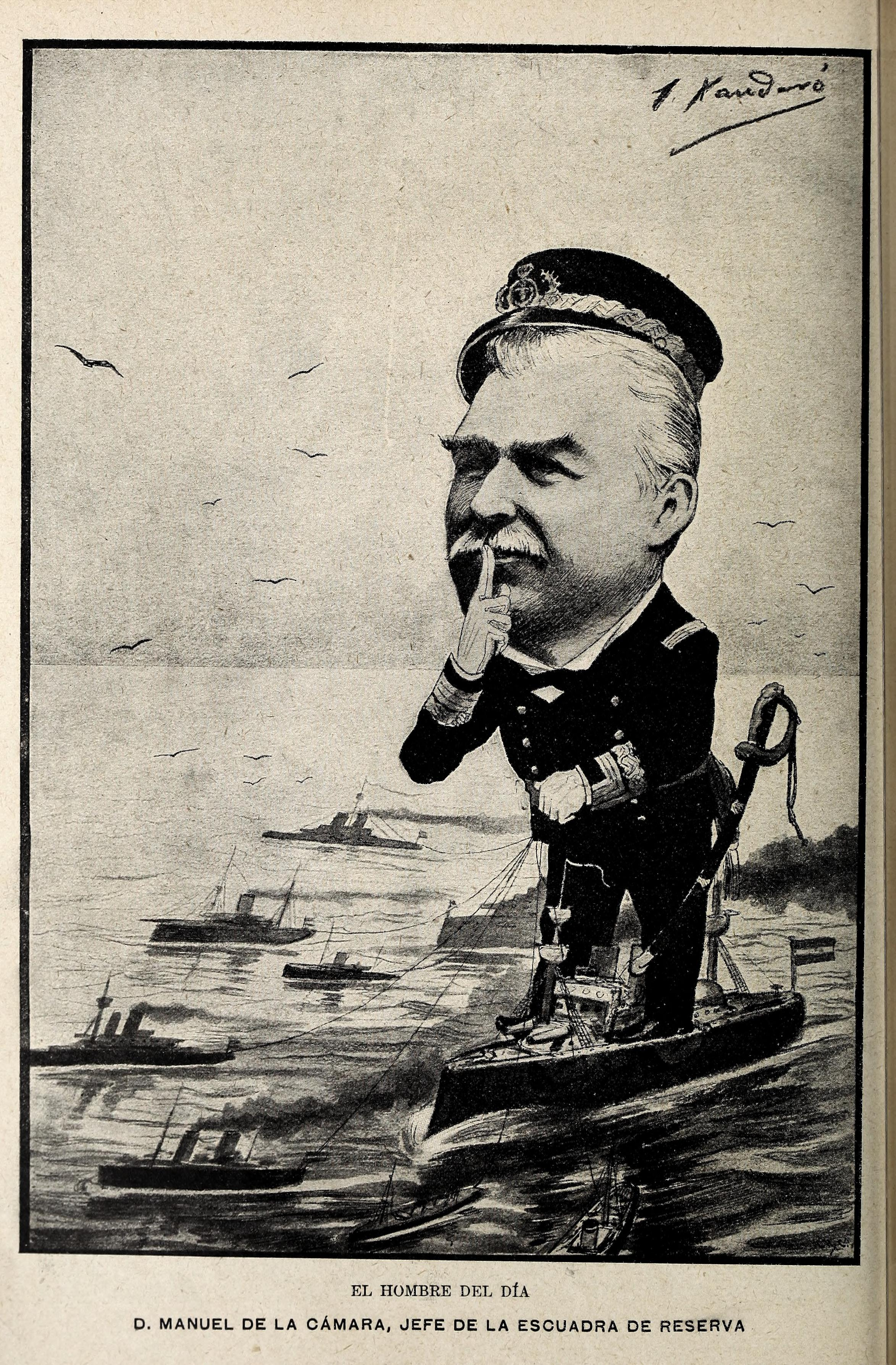
A caricature of Cámara in an 1898 cartoon by Joaquín Xaudaró.

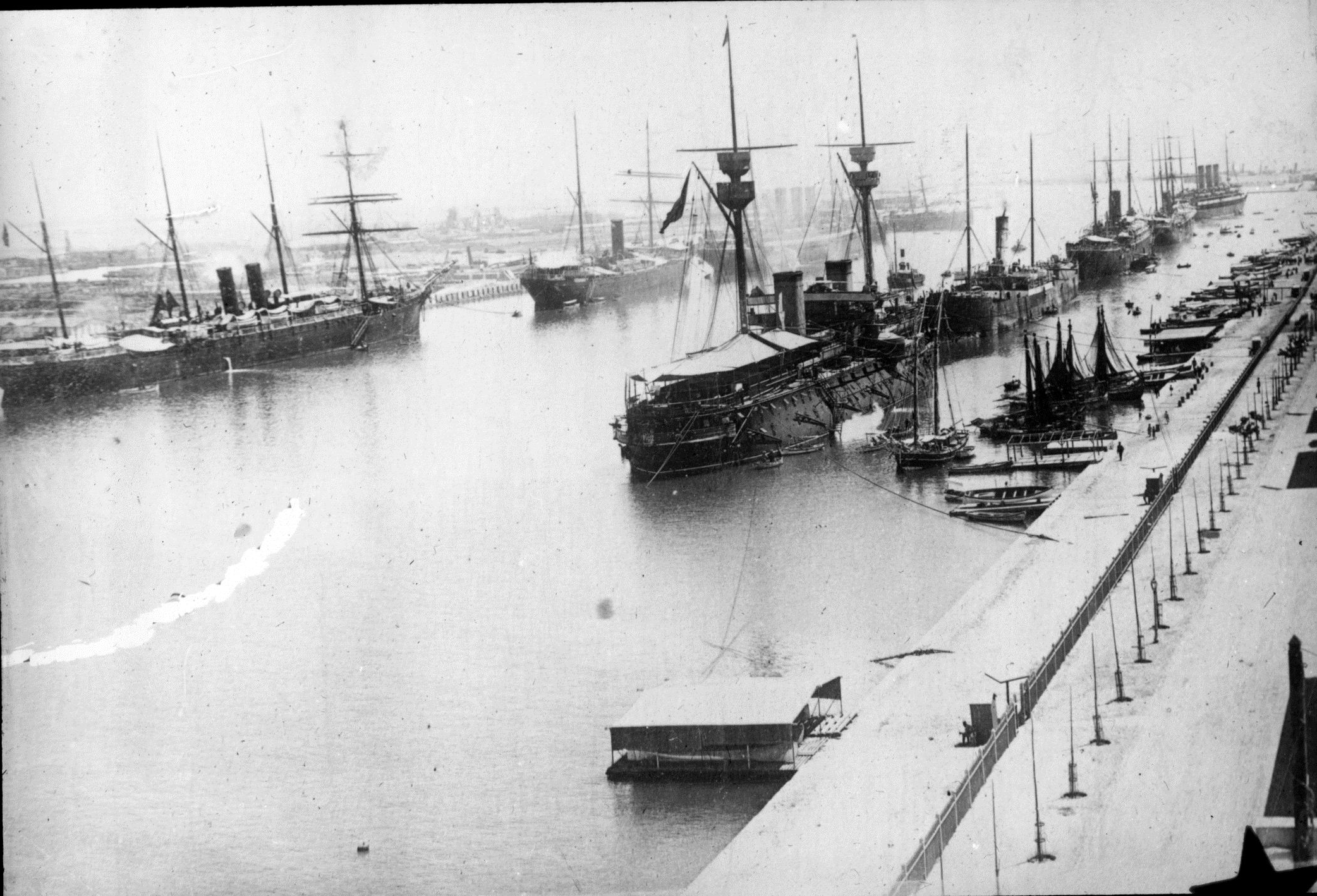
Cámara's squadron in the Suez Canal in July 1898. His flagship, the battleship Pelayo, can be seen in the foreground.

On 15 June 1898, Cámara finally received his orders: Plans to raid the U.S. East Coast were cancelled, and instead he was to depart immediately for the Philippines, escorting a convoy carrying 4,000 Spanish Army troops for reinforcement of the Philippines, and destroy Dewey's squadron there. His orders directed him to depart Cádiz with Pelayo (his flagship), Emperador Carlos V, the auxiliary cruisers Patriota and Rapido, the destroyers Audaz, Osado, and Proserpina, the transports Buenos Aires, Panay, Alfonso XII, and Antonio Lopez, and four colliers carrying 20,000 tons of coal. He was to detach Alfonso XII and Antonio Lopez near Gibraltar after dark so that they could proceed to the Caribbean, then take the rest of his force to the Philippines via Gibraltar, Port Said, Suez, Socotra (at which point the colliers were to be detached to return to Cartagena), the Laccadive Islands, and Ceylon. After that, he was told to coal either along the coast of Sumatra or in Singapore or Batavia, and then either make an optional stop at Labuan, Borneo, or proceed directly to Mindanao. Once in the Philippines, he was to disperse (to places such as Balabac, Jolo, Basilan, and Zamboanga) or concentrate his squadron as best he saw fit to ensure the safe arrival of the troops. Then he was to deal with Dewey's squadron.

Cámara sortied from Cádiz on 16 June 1898, passed Gibraltar on 17 June 1898 (first detaching Alfonso XII and Antonio Lopez for their independent voyages to the Caribbean as ordered), and arrived at Port Said on 26 June 1898. There he requested permission to transship coal. However, intelligence operatives in Spain had made the United States aware of Cámara's itinerary, and the U.S. acting vice consul to Egypt in Cairo, diplomat Ethelbert Watts, had acquired a lien on all coal available in Suez. Further complicating matters for Cámara, the British government, which effectively controlled Egypt at the time, informed him on 29 June that his squadron was not permitted to coal in Egyptian waters, on the grounds that it had enough coal to return to Spain and that any coaling activity it undertook in Egypt would violate Egyptian and British neutrality, and that he would have to return to sea within 24 hours. Cámara complied.

On 3 July 1898, Cámara received orders to send Audaz, Osado, and Proserpina back to Spain, and on 4 July the three destroyers detached from his squadron to begin their return voyage. Ordered to continue its own voyage, the remainder of Cámara's squadron passed through the Suez Canal on 5–6 July 1898. By that time, a United States Department of the Navy bulletin released on 27 June 1898 had announced that U.S. Navy Commodore John C. Watson would "take under his command an armored squadron with cruisers and proceed at once to the Spanish coast" and Cervera's squadron in the Caribbean had been annihilated in the Battle of Santiago de Cuba on 3 July, freeing up the U.S. Navy's heavy forces from the blockade of Santiago de Cuba. Although Watson′s squadron had barely begun to assemble, the Spanish Ministry of Marine, fearful for the security of the Spanish coast, recalled Cámara's squadron, which by then had reached the Red Sea, on 7 July 1898. On the return voyage, Cámara's squadron departed Suez on 11 July 1898 for Spain, where it arrived at Cartagena, Spain, on 23 July and then made its way back to Cádiz. The 2nd Squadron was dissolved on 25 July 1898.

The Spanish–American War ended on 12 August 1898 in a decisive defeat of Spain without Cámara or his ships having had a chance to see combat.

=== Later career ===
After returning from his abortive voyage to the Philippines and the dissolution of the 2nd Squadron, Cámara resumed his command of the Reserve Squadron. It was renamed the Instructional Squadron in January 1899, and as its commander he became chief of training ships for naval cadets, making voyages in the waters of the Iberian Peninsula and to the Canary Islands. In 1901, he took up duties as captain general of the Department of Ferrol, and in 1902 he became aide-de-camp to King Alfonso XIII, in which capacity he met King Carlos I of Portugal at the border with Portugal and escorted him to Madrid. In May 1903 he was promoted to vicealmirante (vice admiral) and appointed president of the Merchant Marine Board.

During his career, Cámara twice served as Director of Materiel at the Spanish Ministry of the Navy.

In August 1903, at his own request, Cámara was transferred to the reserve list and retired from the navy. The Spanish Navy changed its rank structure on 10 January 1912, with senior ranks each increasing by one grade. Thus in retirement Cámara′s rank became almirante (admiral) on that date.

== Personal life ==
Cámara married Emma Díaz Gayen in the Church of Santa María del Sagrario in Málaga on 1 August 1878. They had three sons and a daughter.

In his personal demeanor, Cámara was modest, soft-spoken, reserved and reticent, with an air of dignified gravity and even melancholy. Professionally, he was deliberate, determined, and strong-willed, but he was kind, gentle, attentive, and generous toward his acquaintances. He was personally wealthy and lived a refined life, but quietly and with little ostentation. A deeply religious man, he often read prayers and provided religious instruction to sailors under his command, and at least some of his associates believed that he cared little about the secular affairs of the world. Politically, he was a staunch Royalist in good favor with the Spanish royal family, but he rarely resided in Madrid because he disliked the pomp and circumstance of the royal court and the socializing it demanded.

Because of his English mother, Cámara was sympathetic toward the United Kingdom. During periods of leave from the navy, he often spent one or two months at a time living quietly in London.

== Death ==
Cámara died in Málaga on 4 January 1920. He is buried in the Cemetery of San Miguel in Málaga.

== Honors and awards ==
Awards Cámara received include:

- Cross of Naval Merit First Class (two awards)
- Cross of Military Merit
- Grand Cross of the Order of Charles III (1901)
- Royal and Military Order of Saint Hermenegild (1902)
- Grand Cross of the Order of Naval Merit with white insignia (1903)
- Grand Cross of the Royal and Military Order of Saint Hermenegild (1911)
- Honorary assistant of the Military House of S.M. King D. Alfonso XIII
