= Spanish cruiser Cardenal Cisneros =

Spanish armored cruiser of 1902–1905

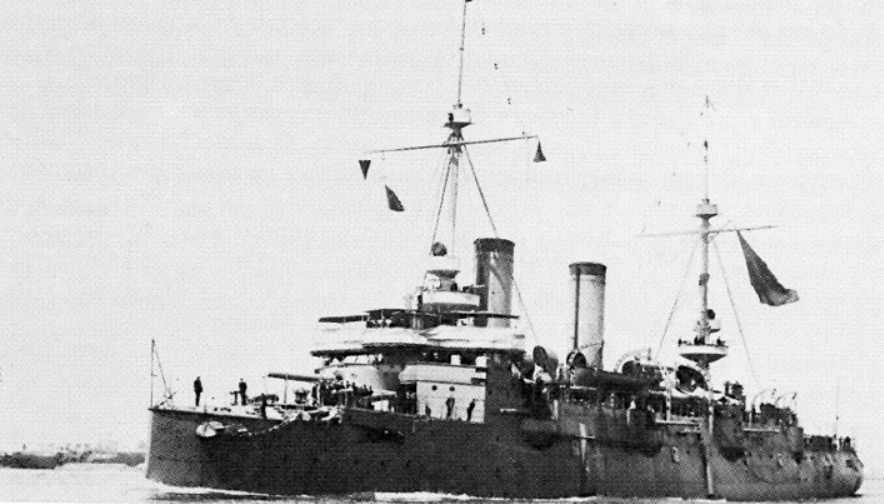

History

Spain
- Name: Cardenal Cisneros
- Namesake: Francisco Jiménez de Cisneros (1436–1517), Spanish cardinal and statesman
- Operator: Spanish Navy
- Ordered: 17 September 1888 (authorized)
- Builder: Reales Astilleros de Esteiro, Ferrol, Spain
- Cost: 22,776,105 pesetas
- Laid down: 1 September 1890
- Launched: 19 March 1897
- Completed: 1 September 1902
- Commissioned: 1902
- Fate: Sank 28 October 1905

General characteristics
- Type: Armoured cruiser
- Displacement: 6,888 tons
- Length: 110.97 m (364 ft 1 in)
- Beam: 18.59 m (61 ft 0 in)
- Draught: 6.61 m (21 ft 8 in)
- Propulsion: Steam engines, 14,800 hp (11,036 kW), two shafts
- Speed: 20 knots (37 km/h; 23 mph)
- Complement: 542
- Armament: 2 × 9.4 in (24 cm) (2 × 1); 8 × 5.5 in (14 cm) (8 × 1); 8 × 57 mm (2.2 in)/42
- Armour: 11.88 in (30.2 cm) belt; 7.88 in (20.0 cm) barbette; 7.88 in (20.0 cm) conning tower; 3.88 in (9.9 cm) turret; 2.25 in (5.7 cm) deck

Cardenal Cisneros was a Spanish Navy Princesa de Asturias-class armored cruiser commissioned in 1902. Because of a navigational error, she struck a rock and sank on 28 October 1905.

Cardenal Cisneros was named for Francisco Jiménez de Cisneros (1436–1517), Order of Friars Minor, a Spanish cardinal, religious reformer, and statesman who twice served as regent of Spain.

== Characteristics ==
Cardenal Cisneros was 110.97 metres (364 ft 1 in) long and had a beam of 18.59 metres (61 ft 0 in), a draft of 6.61 metres (21 ft 8 in), and a displacement of 6,888 tons. She had reciprocating steam engines rated at 14,800 indicated horsepower (11,036 kW) driving two shafts, giving her a top speed of 20 knots (37 km/h; 23 mph). Her main armament consisted of two 9.4-inch (239 mm) guns mounted in single turrets. Her secondary armament consisted of eight 5.5-inch (140 mm) guns on single mounts.

The Princesa de Asturias-class ships in essence were modernized Infanta Maria Teresa-class cruisers with more modern and better-balanced armament, but like the Infanta Maria Teresa-class ships their armour coverage was not comprehensive, and the ships were poorly armoured by the standards of their time. Cardenal Cisneros had belt armour of 11.88 inches (30.2 cm), conning tower and barbette armour of 7.88 inches (20.0 cm), 3.88-inch (9.9 cm) turret armour, and 2.25-inch (5.7 cm) deck armour.

== Construction and commissioning ==
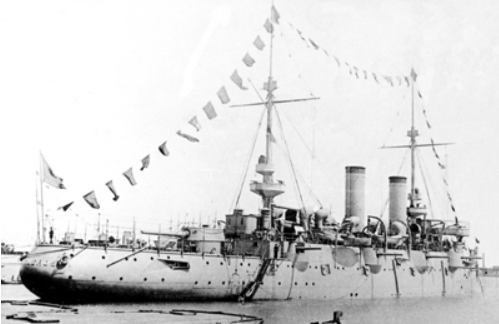
Cardenal Cisneros dressed overall.

The Spanish Cortes Generales approved the construction of Cardenal Cisneros on 12 January 1887, and her construction was authorized by a royal decree of 17 September 1888. She was laid down at the Reales Astilleros de Esteiro (Esteiro Royal Dockyards) at Ferrol, Spain, on 1 September 1890. Work on her stopped when the shipyard's material and labor were diverted to the construction of the protected cruiser Alfonso XIII, but her construction later resumed. Named Cardenal Cisneros by a royal decree of 28 August 1893, she was launched on 19 March 1897 and began fitting out.

Cardenal Cisneros started her sea trials on 1 August 1902, beginning with coal consumption trials at various speeds. Her speed trials took place on 14 August, when she achieved 18 knots (33 km/h; 21 mph) under natural draft while steaming between Cabo Prioriño and Cortegada Island. Although she did not undergo speed trials under forced draft, engineers calculated that she could generate 15,000 horsepower (11,185 kW) and achieve 20.7 knots (38.3 km/h; 23.8 mph) under forced draft. She was delivered to the Spanish Navy on 1 September 1902. Her total construction cost was 22,776,105 pesetas.

== Service history ==
=== 1902–1905 ===
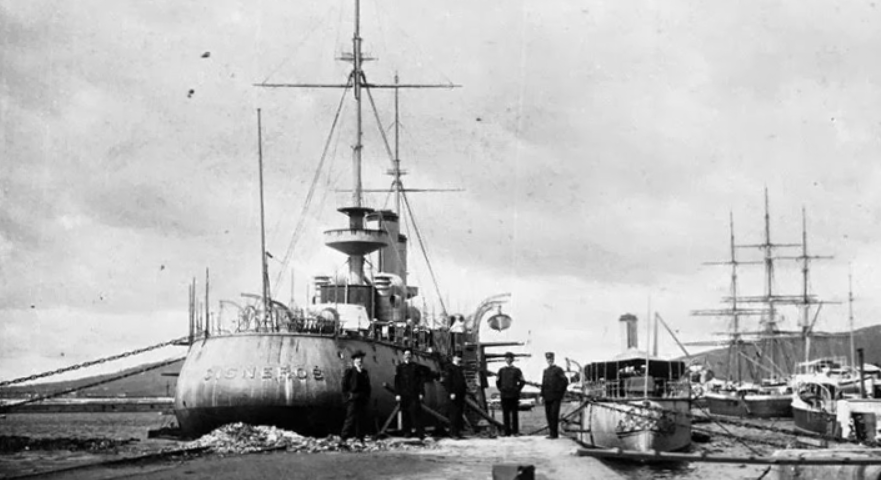
Cardenal Cisneros (left) at Ferrol, Spain, in 1903.

Cardenal Cisneros got underway from Ferrol at 10:00 on 13 September 1902 for her first voyage in naval service, a visit to San Sebastián with the captain general of the Department of Ferrol aboard. She anchored in La Concha Bay off San Sebastián on the afternoon of 14 September. On 19 September she headed for Bilbao, and she returned to Ferrol on 22 September 1902. She conducted gunnery exercises off Ferrol on 22 October 1902.

Cardenal Cisneros did not leave Ferrol again until 20 March 1903, when she again carried out gunnery exercises. She made a voyage to Cádiz in April 1903, arriving there on 5 April. She then continued on to Mahón on Menorca in the Balearic Islands in company with the coastal defence ships Numancia and Vitoria, arriving on the morning of 11 April 1903.

Cardenal Cisneros, Numancia, the battleship Pelayo, the armored cruisers Princesa de Asturias and Emperador Carlos V, the protected cruiser Extremadura, and the destroyer Audaz were at Cartagena on the occasion of King Alfonso XIII's visit to the city on 22 June 1903. At 10:30 on 7 December 1903, Cardenal Cisneros got underway from Vigo in company with Emperador Carlos V and the destroyer Osado for Lisbon, Portugal, accompanying King Alfonso XIII on his first official visit abroad. The ships arrived at Lisbon on the morning of 8 December 1903. Cardenal Cisneros returned to Ferrol on the morning of 20 December 1903.

In January 1904, Cardenal Cisneros made a voyage eastward in the Cantabrian Sea along the northern coast of Spain, stopping at Gijón, Santander, Bilbao, and Pasajes. On her return trip, she visited those and other ports before arriving at Ferrol on 22 February 1904.

On 15 April 1904, Cardenal Cisneros departed Ferrol bound for Cádiz, where she rendezvoused with the royal yacht Giralda, upon which King Alfonso XIII was embarked. From Cádiz, Cardenal Cisneros and the protected cruisers Lepanto and Río de la Plata escorted Giralda as Alfonso XIII visited the Balearic Islands, first stopping at Mahón, then arriving on the afternoon of 21 April 1904 at Palma de Mallorca on Mallorca, where they rendezvoused with Numancia and a British Royal Navy squadron under the command of Vice-Admiral Charles Beresford that had arrived from Gibraltar. On the morning of 25 April Giralda and her escorts arrived at Ibiza, then set course for the Chafarinas Islands, which they reached on 26 April. On 27 April, the Spanish squadron departed for Málaga. Getting back underway from Málaga on 1 May 1904, the ships called at Melilla on the coast of North Africa. The king and his escorting ships then stopped at Chafarinas and Ceuta before ending the voyage at Cádiz.

Cardenal Cisneros conducted maneuvers with other Spanish Navy ships off Santa Pola in late June and early July 1904. After completing them, she visited Mahón on 11 July and called at Cartagena from 29 July to 9 September before moving on to Ferrol, which she reached on 13 September 1904. Between late September and mid-October 1904, she carried out maneuvers with Pelayo, Río de la Plata, Audaz, and the gunboat Álvaro de Bazán in the Cantabrian Sea off the north coast of Spain. The ships then proceeded to the waters off Galicia, where they conducted more maneuvers with the Training Squadron during the first week of November 1904.

On 13 January 1905, Cardenal Cisneros, Pelayo, Princesa de Asturias, Emperador Carlos V, Extremadura, Río de la Plata, and the unprotected cruiser Infanta Isabel formed a squadron at Cádiz to receive the Duke and Duchess of Connaught and Strathearn, Prince Arthur and Princess Louise Margaret, as they arrived there aboard the Royal Navy armoured cruiser HMS Essex. From 5 to 25 February 1905, the squadron visited Santa Cruz de Tenerife on Tenerife in the Canary Islands. It then returned to Spain. On 3 April 1905, Cardenal Cisneros entered Mahón escorting the German passenger ship Hamburg, on board which Emperor Wilhelm II of Germany was traveling. In April 1905, Cardenal Cisneros made a voyage from Alicante to Ferrol, where she arrived in late April and entered dry dock to have her bottom cleaned.

Cardenal Cisneros and Princesa de Asturias departed Ferrol on 27 May 1905 to escort King Alfonso XIII aboard Giralda. After a stop at Cherbourg, France, the ships arrived at Portsmouth, England, on 3 June 1905 for Alfonso XIII's visit to the United Kingdom. The ships got underway from Portsmouth on 16 June and arrived at Ferrol on the afternoon of 18 June 1905.

On 30 June 1905 the two armored cruisers got back underway from Ferrol to conduct naval exercises in the waters off Rías Baixas (Spanish: Rías Bajas). After completing them, they departed Marín at 06:00 on 13 July 1905 with Princesa de Asturias serving as the flagship of the division commander. After rendezvousing with Extremadura off Cape Ortegal, they arrived on 13 July at San Sebastián, where they joined Giralda for an international regatta. After its completion, the two armored cruisers got underway for Bilbao on 30 July. They returned to San Sebastián on the morning of 6 August during an unusually fierce summer storm.

On 30 July 1905, Cardenal Cisneros and Princesa de Asturias got underway from Ferrol for naval exercises off Rías Baixas (Spanish: Rías Bajas). The two armored cruisers again left Ferrol in October 1905 bound for Muros, arriving there on 24 October to conduct maneuvers with some of the other ships of the Training Squadron, namely Extremadura, Río de la Plata , and the gunboat Marqués de la Victoria. After the maneuvers concluded on 27 October, the ships again called at Muros. The squadron then parted company with Cardenal Cisneros, proceeding to Vigo and then to Cádiz. Cardenal Cisneros, meanwhile, had orders to set course for Ferrol, where she would undergo repairs and have her bottom cleaned.

=== Loss ===
Cardenal Cisneros got underway from Muros for her voyage to Ferrol at 07:00 on 28 October 1905. Her crew made a navigational error as she left the harbor and she took the wrong course, heading toward the Meixidos shoals. Two fishermen who realized that the ship was in danger tried to warn her crew by waving jackets and other clothing at her, but Cardenal Cisneros′s crew misunderstood, believing that the fishermen merely were bidding their ship farewell. A crewman aboard Cardenal Cisneros who had grown up in Muros and was familiar with the local waters tried to warn the ship's navigation officer that she was heading into danger, but the officer disdainfully dismissed him.

At 09:00 Cardenal Cisneros struck the shoal's rocks while making 10 knots (19 km/h; 12 mph). Her commanding officer ordered her engines stopped, and she coasted to a halt about 2.5 nautical miles (4.6 km; 2.9 mi) from the point of impact. One of his officers went below to inspect the damage, finding that the collision had torn a 50-metre (164-foot) hole in the hull and that both boiler rooms and several other compartments forward of them were flooding. After receiving the officer's damage report, the commanding officer gave the order to abandon ship. The ship's 544 crewmen and five passengers — the commanding officer's wife and four Peruvian Navy officers — abandoned ship without loss of life, the last of them leaving the ship about 20 minutes after she struck the rocks. Cardenal Cisneros sank by the bow sometime between 30 and 45 minutes after she struck the rock.

A court martial of Cardenal Cisneros′s officers determined that the rock she struck did not appear on her nautical charts. The commanding officer was found guilty only of neglect of duty for failing to ensure that the ship's logbook was saved when abandoning ship, and he received only a year's probation. A hydrographic survey of the waters in which Cardenal Cisneros sank took place a few weeks after her loss and encountered difficulty in finding the rock she struck because of the distance she traveled from it before sinking.

== Wreck ==
Three Spanish divers who in 2004 had discovered the wreck of the light cruiser Blas de Lezo next decided to find the nearby wreck of Cardenal Cisneros. After studying her sinking to determine an approximate location of the wreck, they found a wreck on the first day of their search in 2006. They identified the wreck as that of Cardenal Cisneros the following day, finding a board on which the shipyard had engraved her name and the information that four workers had died and 153 others had suffered injuries during her construction. They also noted that the wreck's clearly visible armament matched that of Cardenal Cisneros.

Cardenal Cisneros′s wreck lies about 2 nautical miles (3.7 km; 2.3 mi) from the Meixidos shoal and about 5 nautical miles (9.3 km; 5.8 mi) south of the wreck of Blas de Lezo. It sits upright on the sea bed in 65 metres (213 ft) of water. Although it remained easily recognizable in 2006, the divers noted significant structural decay, including the collapse of large sections of the deck. Cardenal Cisneros′s safe contained 30,000 silver pesetas when she sank, and her crew lost the keys to the safe while abandoning ship; the safe lies somewhere in the wreck, but the divers reported that the state of the wreck makes its recovery impossible.
