= Spanish cruiser Rapido =

- SS Columbia

History

German Empire
- Name: Columbia
- Owner: Hamburg America Line
- Operator: Hamburg America line
- Builder: Laird Brothers, Birkenhead, England
- Yard number: V0564
- Launched: 27 February 1889
- Fate: Sold to Spanish Navy 8 April 1898
- Acquired: Purchased from Spanish Navy late 1898 or 1899
- Fate: Sold to Imperial Russian Navy early 1904

Spain
- Name: Rapido
- Acquired: 8 April 1898
- Commissioned: 20 April 1898
- Fate: Sold to Hamburg America Line late 1898 or 1899

Russian Empire
- Name: Terek
- Acquired: Early 1904
- Commissioned: 25 August 1904
- Stricken: December 1906
- Fate: Scrapped 1907

General characteristics (Columbia as built)
- Type: Passenger ship
- Tonnage: 7,241 or 7,383 gross register tons
- Length: 141.3 m (463.6 ft); 146.3 m (480.0 ft) (length overall)
- Beam: 17.0 m (55.8 ft)
- Propulsion: Triple expansion engines, 2 screws, auxiliary sails
- Speed: 20.5 knots (38.0 km/h; 23.6 mph) (trials); 18.0 knots (33.3 km/h; 20.7 mph) (in service)
- Capacity: 220 first-class passengers; 120 second-class passengers; 800 third-class passengers
- Notes: 3 masts, 3 funnels

General characteristics (as Rapido)
- Type: Auxiliary cruiser
- Displacement: 9,500 tons
- Length: 145 m (475 ft 9 in)
- Beam: 16.5 m (54 ft 2 in)
- Draft: 10.8 m (35 ft 5 in)
- Propulsion: 12,500 horsepower (9,321 kW), twin screws
- Speed: 19 knots (35 km/h; 22 mph)
- Complement: 320
- Armament: 2 × 162 mm/35 breechloading guns; 2 × 140 mm/35 breechloading guns; 6 × 47 mm/44 quick-firing guns
- Armor: 1 in (2.5 cm) deck; 4.5 in (11 cm) gun shields

General characteristics (as Terek)
- Type: Auxiliary cruiser
- Displacement: 10,000 tons
- Length: 139.9 m (459 ft 0 in)
- Beam: 17.1 m (56 ft 1 in)
- Propulsion: 13,300 hp (9,918 kW)
- Speed: 19 knots (35 km/h; 22 mph)
- Armament: 2 × 120 mm/45 guns; 4 × 75 mm/48 guns; 8 × 57 mm guns

Rapido was an auxiliary cruiser that served in the Spanish Navy during the Spanish–American War in 1898. Before her Spanish Navy service, she served as the commercial passenger ship SS Columbia for the Hamburg America Line from 1889 to 1898. She returned to commercial service as Columbia with Hamburg America from 1899 to 1904, but early in 1904 the Imperial Russian Navy purchased her for service as the auxiliary cruiser Terek during the Russo-Japanese War of 1904–1905.

== Hamburg America Line (1889–1898) ==
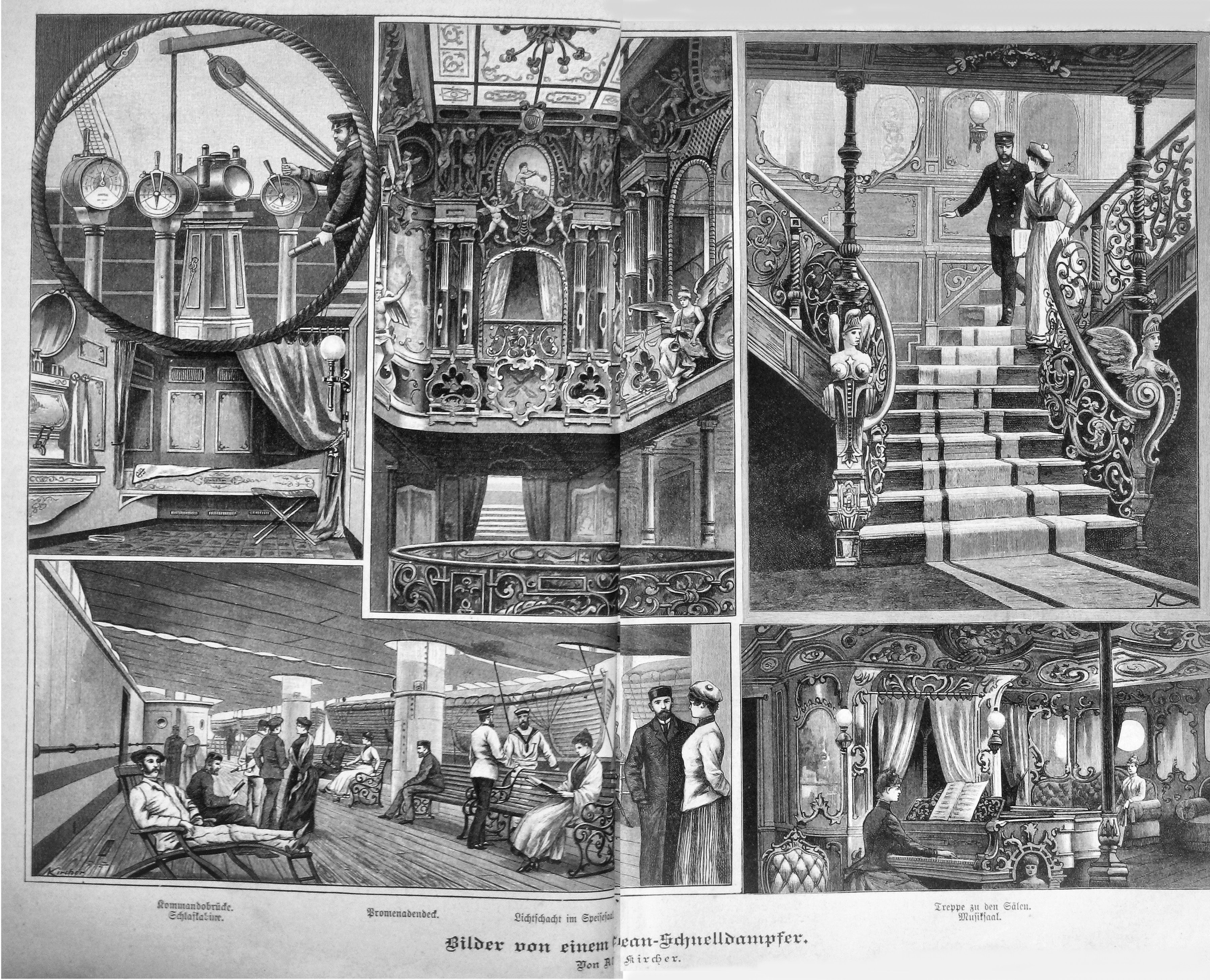
Interior of the Columbia in 1890

Columbia was built in 1889 as a steam passenger ship for the German Empire′s Hamburg America Line. With a capacity of 400 first-class, 120 second-class, and 580 third-class passengers in commercial use, she was designed so that she could be converted into an auxiliary cruiser for service in the Imperial German Navy in the event of a war. She was launched by floating out of drydock on 27 February 1889 and was delivered to Hamburg America soon thereafter. Assigned to the Hamburg-Southampton-New York City route, she began her maiden voyage from Hamburg on 18 July 1889.

== Spanish Navy ==
On 8 April 1898, the Spanish Navy purchased Columbia from Hamburg America for Spanish–American War service as an auxiliary cruiser. Armed and renamed Rapido, she was commissioned on 20 April 1898.

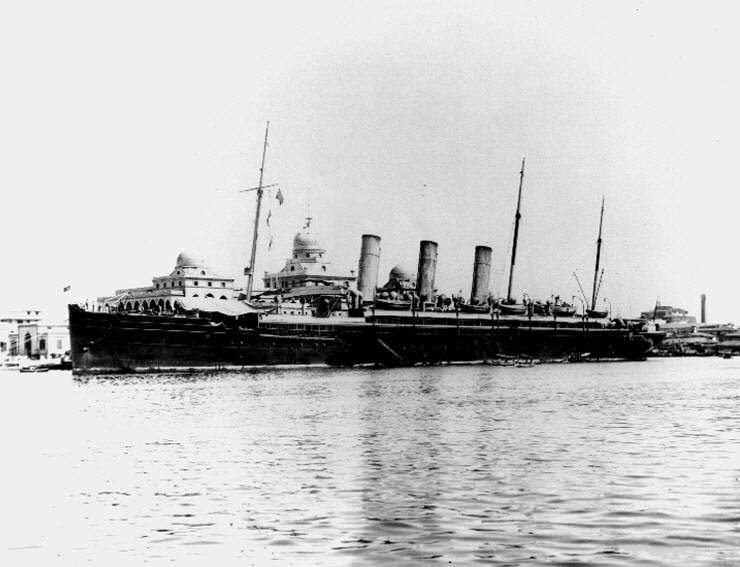
Rapido with Camara's squadron at Port Said in 1898.

Rapido became part of the relief expedition for the Philippines commanded by Rear Admiral Manuel de Camara and charged with destroying the United States Navy Asiatic Squadron of Commodore George Dewey there, as well as with delivering 4,000 Spanish Army troops to reinforce the Philippines. Camara's squadron – consisting of the battleship Pelayo, the armored cruiser Emperador Carlos V, the auxiliary cruiser Patriota, the destroyers Audaz, Osado, and Proserpina, the transports Buenos Aires, Panay, Alfonso XII, and Antonio Lopez, and four colliers as well as Rapido – sortied from Cádiz on 16 June 1898.

After detaching Alfonso XII and Antonio Lopez to make independent voyages to the Caribbean, Rapido and the rest of the squadron passed Gibraltar on 17 June 1898 and arrived at Port Said, Egypt, on 26 June 1898. There Camara requested permission to transship coal, which the Egyptian government finally denied on 30 June 1898 out of concern for Egyptian neutrality.

By the time Rapido and the rest of Camara's squadron arrived at Suez on 5 July 1898, the squadron of Vice Admiral Pascual Cervera y Topete had been annihilated off Cuba in the Battle of Santiago de Cuba, freeing up the U.S. Navy's heavy forces from the blockade of Santiago de Cuba. Fearful for the security of the Spanish coast, the Spanish Ministry of Marine recalled Camara's squadron on 7 July 1898. Rapido and the rest of the squadron departed Suez on 11 July 1898 for Spain, and Camara's squadron was dissolved on 25 July 1898.

The war ended in August 1898 without Rapido seeing combat. After the war, the Spanish Navy used Rapido as a troopship to transport Spanish Army soldiers from Cuba to Spain.

== Hamburg America Line (1899–1904) ==
In late 1898 or in 1899, Hamburg America bought Rapido from the Spanish Navy and returned her to commercial passenger service under her original name, Columbia. Again operating on the Hamburg-Southampton-New York City route, Columbia began her first post-war commercial voyage by departing Hamburg on 31 August 1899.

== Imperial Russian Navy ==
After the Russo-Japanese War broke out in February 1904 with an Imperial Japanese Navy surprise torpedo attack against the Imperial Russian Navy Pacific Squadron at its anchorage at Port Arthur in Manchuria, the Russian Admiralty Board decided to outfit six passenger ships of the Russian Volunteer Fleet (Dobroflot) for use as auxiliary cruisers. One of them was Columbia, which the Russians purchased from the Hamburg America Line for Dobroflot shortly after the war began and steamed to Libau, where she underwent conversion into an auxiliary cruiser. She was commissioned into naval service as Terek on 25 August 1904.

Initially, the Admiralty Board planned for the six auxiliary cruisers to operate from a base in the Sunda Islands in the Netherlands East Indies, from which they would attack shipping bound for Japan so as to cut Japan off from war material shipments from Europe and the United States and buy time for the Russian Pacific Squadron to recover from the surprise attack. These plans changed while Terek was undergoing conversion at Libau, the Admiralty Board deciding instead that a battle squadron from the Baltic Fleet should make the long voyage to East Asian waters to reinforce the Pacific Squadron and that the auxiliary cruisers should accompany the battle squadron. Terek was commissioned just as Vice Admiral Zinovy Rozhestvensky took command of the squadron in August 1904 and the first serious preparations for the East Asian deployment began.

While the squadron prepared at Libau, Terek deployed to the Atlantic Ocean for anti-shipping operations during September 1904. She stopped British merchant ships to inspect them for contraband, including the 2,490-gross register ton steamer Margit Groedel on 6 September, the 1,642-gross register ton collier Treherbert – bound from Newport, Wales, to Algiers in French Algeria – near Gibraltar on 12 September, and the steamer Derwen in the waters between Cape St. Vincent and Gibraltar on 14 September, in each case allowing the ship to proceed after searching her and examining her papers. Working her way southward, Terek then arrived at Las Palmas in the Canary Islands, where she began coaling on 22 September. The same day, Spanish authorities in Madrid, saying that they were acting in response to a protest by the British ambassador to Spain demanding that Spanish authorities not allow Terek to use any Spanish port as a base for harassing British shipping, prohibited Terek from taking aboard any fresh water or provisions and ordered her to stop coaling and leave Las Palmas immediately, but Terek′s commanding officer replied that he could not leave because his ship′s engines required repairs. The British protected cruisers HMS St George and HMS Brilliant anchored at Las Palmas on the morning of 23 September to signal British concern over Terek′s activities, however, and Terek departed at noon that day. By 28 September, Terek had arrived at Lisbon, Portugal, and on 4 October 1904 she stopped the British merchant ship Carisbrook in the Bay of Biscay and detained her for a lengthy period while examining her papers before allowing her to proceed.

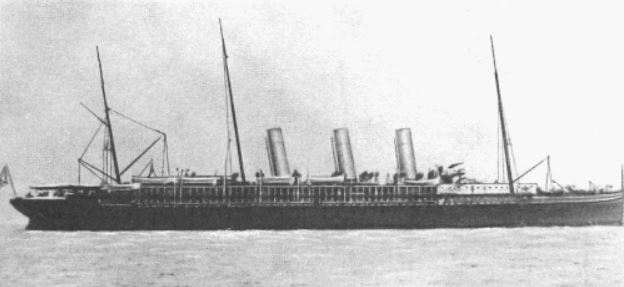
Terek

Terek eventually returned to Libau, where she made her own preparations for the voyage to East Asia. Although Rozhestvensky himself departed Libau on 16 October 1904 with the majority of the Baltic Fleet forces bound for East Asia – by now redesignated as the Second Pacific Squadron – Terek remained at Libau for another month, finally departing on 16 November 1904 in company with the protected cruisers Izumrud and Oleg, the auxiliary cruiser Kuban, the hospital ship Orel, and the destroyers Gromki, Grozni, Prozorlivi, Ryani, and Ryezvi. She transited the Mediterranean Sea and Suez Canal and rendezvoused with the rest of the Second Pacific Squadron at Nosy Be off the northwest coast of Madagascar on 13 January 1905. She accompanied the squadron, performing scouting, reconnaissance, and escort functions and providing security for the other warships while they coaled, as it crossed the Indian Ocean, transited the Strait of Malacca, and passed through the South China Sea. In the East China Sea on 23 May 1905, Rozhestvenski detached Terek and Kuban with orders to proceed independently, steam into the Pacific Ocean up the east coast of Japan to the vicinity of Tokyo Bay, and capture or sink both Japanese shipping and neutral merchant ships carrying contraband to or from Japan. Rozhestvenski hoped that their activities would provide a diversion that would distract the Japanese and tie down some of their naval forces while the Second Pacific Squadron passed through the Strait of Tsushima and the Sea of Japan.

The two raiders do not seem to have had much success at drawing away Japanese naval forces, but Rozhestvenski's decision to detach them spared them from the almost complete annihilation of his squadron in the Battle of Tsushima on 27–28 May 1905, and Terek subsequently captured and sank two ships carrying war materiel to Japan. First, on 5 June 1905, she captured the 3,382-gross register ton SS Ikona, a British steamer carrying a cargo of rice from Rangoon to Japan, and sank her at a position reported variously as 150 nautical miles (278 km) north of Hong Kong, and in the Philippine Sea at 20°02′N 134°01′E. On 22 June 1905, she captured and sank the 3,518-gross register ton SS Prinsesse Marie, a Danish steamer on a voyage from Singapore to Japan with a cargo of hardware and provisions, in the South China Sea at 13°57′N 113°15′E. She arrived at Batavia in the Netherlands East Indies on 29 June 1905, putting the crew of Prinsesse Marie ashore and demanding coal, but the Dutch colonial authorities refused. They interned her at Batavia on 9 June 1905, bringing her active naval career to an end.

Terek was stricken in December 1906. She was scrapped in 1907.
