= Spanish transport Buenos Aires =

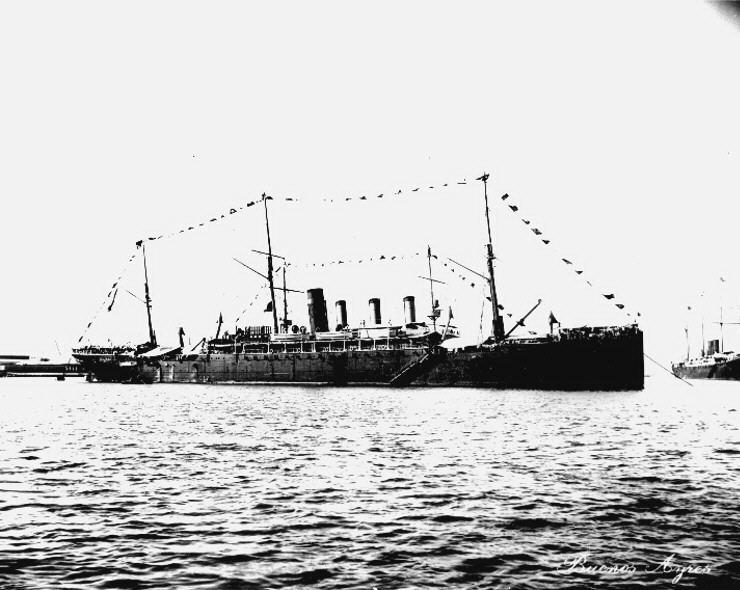
- Buenos Aires with Camara's squadron at Port Said in 1898. The three funnels behind her belong to the armored cruiser Emperador Carlos V. Both ships are dressed overall.

History

Armada Española Ensign
- Name: Buenos Aires
- Namesake: Buenos Aires, the capital of Argentina
- Builder: William Denny and Brothers
- Completed: 1887
- Acquired: 1898
- Fate: Returned to mercantile service 1898; scrapped 1942
- Notes: In mercantile service 1887–1898 and 1898–1942

General characteristics
- Type: Transport
- Propulsion: steam

Buenos Aires was a merchant ship requisitioned for use as a transport by the Spanish Navy in June and July 1898 during the Spanish–American War.

Buenos Aires was built in 1887 and was in commercial service until the Spanish Navy requisitioned her for Spanish–American War service in June 1898. Serving as a transport, she became part of the relief expedition for the Philippines commanded by Rear Admiral Manuel de Camara and charged with destroying the United States Navy Asiatic Squadron of Commodore George Dewey there, as well as with delivering 4,000 Spanish Army troops to reinforce the Philippines. Camara's squadron—consisting of the battleship Pelayo, the armored cruiser Emperador Carlos V, the auxiliary cruisers Patriota and Rapido, the destroyers Audaz, Osado, and Proserpina, and the transports Panay, Alfonso XII, and Antonio Lopez, and four colliers as well as Buenos Aires—sortied from Cádiz on 16 June 1898.

Buenos Aires and her consorts passed Gibraltar on 17 June 1898 (first detaching Alfonso XII and Antonio Lopez to make independent voyages to the Caribbean), and arrived at Port Said, Egypt, on 26 June 1898. There Camara requested permission to transship coal, which the Egyptian government finally denied on 30 June 1898 out of concern for Egyptian neutrality.

By the time Buenos Aires and the rest of Camara's squadron arrived at Suez on 5 July 1898, the squadron of Vice Admiral Pascual Cervera y Topete had been annihilated in the Battle of Santiago de Cuba, freeing up the U.S. Navy's heavy forces from the blockade of Santiago de Cuba. Fearful for the security of the Spanish coast, the Spanish Ministry of Marine recalled Camara's squadron on 7 July 1898. Buenos Aires and the rest of the squadron departed Suez on 11 July 1898 for Spain.

By the end of July 1898, Buenos Aires had returned to commercial service. After a long life, she was scrapped in 1942.
