= Spanish cruiser Emperador Carlos V =

Spanish armored cruiser of 1898–1931

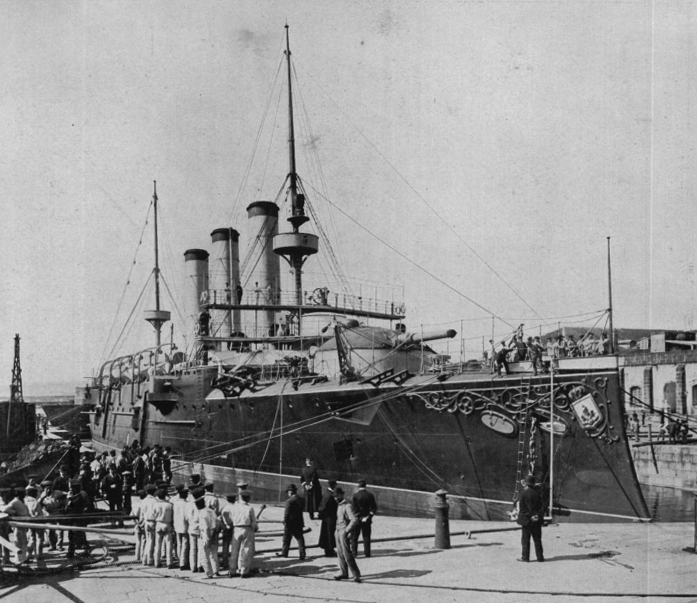
- Emperador Carlos V around 1898.

History

Spain
- Name: Emperador Carlos V
- Namesake: Charles V (1500–1558), King of Spain (1516–1556) and Holy Roman Emperor (1519–1556)
- Awarded: 30 April 1891
- Builder: Vea Murguía, Noriega y Cía, Cádiz, Spain
- Laid down: 4 March 1892
- Launched: 12 March 1895
- Completed: 2 June 1898
- Decommissioned: 5 December 1931
- Stricken: 1932
- Fate: Scrapped early 1933

General characteristics
- Type: Armored cruiser
- Displacement: 9,090 long tons (9,236 t) (standard); 10,220 long tons (10,384 t) (full load)
- Length: 126.31 m (414 ft 5 in) overall; 115.82 m (380 ft 0 in) between perpendiculars
- Beam: 20.42 m (67 ft 0 in)
- Draft: 7.62 m (25 ft 0 in) mean
- Depth: 12.35 m (40 ft 6 in)
- Installed power: 18,500 ihp (13,795 kW) (forced draft; 15,000 ihp (11,185 kW) on trials with natural draft
- Propulsion: Two 4-cylinder Maquinista Terrestre y Marítima vertical triple expansion steam engines, 2 shafts; Coal 1,200 tons (normal), 1,800 tons (maximum)
- Speed: 20 knots (37 km/h; 23 mph) (forced draft); 19 knots (35 km/h; 22 mph) (natural draft on trials)
- Range: 3,300 nmi (6,100 km; 3,800 mi) (full power); 12,000 nmi (22,000 km; 14,000 mi) at 11 kn (20 km/h; 13 mph)
- Complement: 600
- Armament: 2 × 280 mm (11 in) guns; 8 × 140 mm (5.5 in) guns; 4 × 105 mm (4.1 in) quick-firing guns; 2 × 12-pounder (5.4 kg) quick-firing guns; 4 × 6-pounder (2.7 kg) quick-firing guns; 4 × 1-pounder (0.45 kg) quick-firing guns; 2 × machine guns; 6 × torpedo tubes
- Armor: Belt: 2 in (51 mm), made up of 1 in (25 mm) Siemens and 1 in chrome; Barbettes: 9.75 in (248 mm); Gun shields: 6.5 in (170 mm); Conning tower: 12 in (300 mm); Deck: 6.5 in; Hoods: 3.875 in (98.4 mm); Battery: 2 in, made up of 1 in Siemens and 1 in chrome

Emperador Carlos V was an armored cruiser of the Spanish Navy in commission from 1898 to 1931. She was rushed into service during the Spanish-American War in 1898 , but did not see combat during the war. She took part in the second Melillan campaign during 1909.

Emperador Carlos V was named for Charles V (1500–1558), who was King of Spain from 1516 to 1556 and Holy Roman Emperor from 1519 to 1556.

== Technical characteristics ==
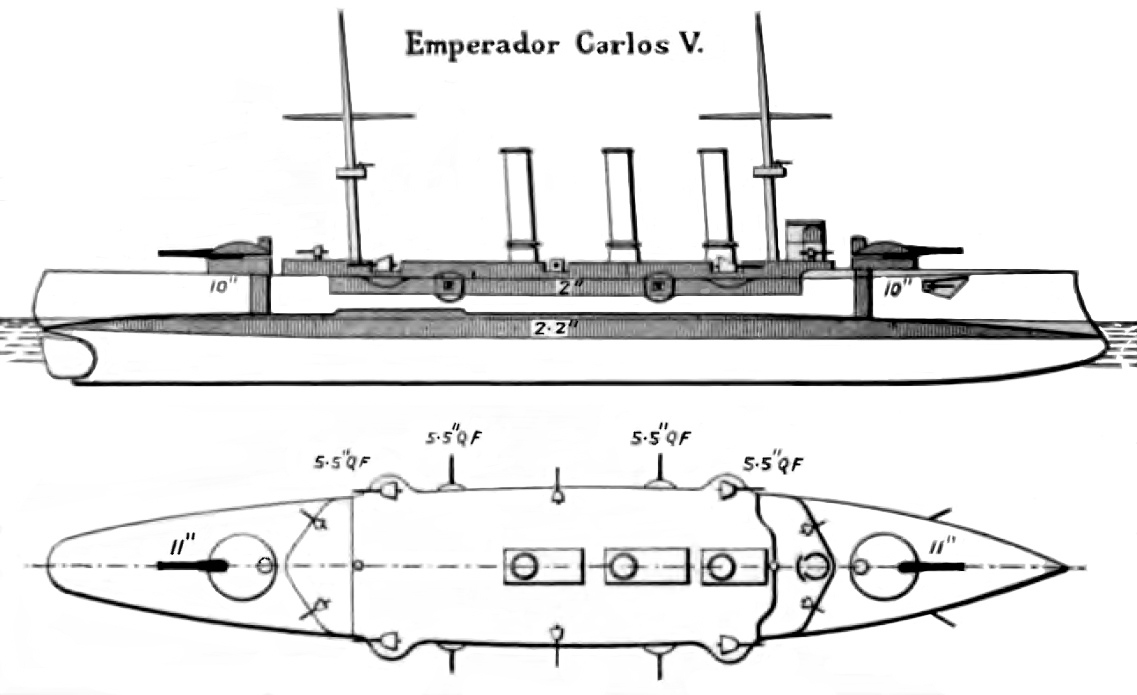
Right elevation and deck plan as depicted in Brassey's Naval Annual 1906

Emperador Carlos V′s designed was derived from that of the British Blake-class protected cruisers. The Spanish Navy classified her as a "first-class battleship," but she actually was an armored cruiser, although she lacked the speed, armor, and armament of foreign armored cruisers and in some ways resembled a large protected cruiser. Her boilers and propulsion machinery were of Spanish construction, her armor German, her stern and stern post British, and her gun turrets were French, making her construction a complicated process.

Emperador Carlos V had three funnels. Her two vertical triple expansion steam engines — manufactured by Maquinista Terrestre y Marítima of Barcelona, Spain — and four boilers generated 18,000 indicated horsepower (13,423 kW) under forced draft and 15,000 indicated horsepower (11,185 kW) under natural draft on trials and drove two screws, giving her a maximum speed of 20 knots (37 km/h; 23 mph) under forced draft and 19 knots (35 km/h; 22 mph) under natural draft on trials. In service, however, she managed only 16 knots (30 km/h; 18 mph).

Emperador Carlos V′s 11-inch (280 mm) main guns were mounted fore and aft in centerline hooded barbettes. One of her strengths was considered to be her great steaming range: With limited fuel, she could steam 3,300 nautical miles (6,100 km; 3,800 mi) at full power and 12,000 nautical miles (22,000 km; 14,000 mi) at an economical cruising speed of 11 knots (20 km/h; 13 mph).

Emperador Carlos V was weakly armored, relying mostly on her armored deck for protection. Her belt armor was 160 millimetres (6.3 in) and her deck armor 60 millimetres (2.4 in). Her main gun turrets had 254 millimetres (10 in) of armor, and her secondary guns had 101 millimetres (4.0 in) of armor protection. Her steel hull was divided into 129 watertight compartments.

== Construction and commissioning ==
Emperador Carlos V′s construction was part of the naval plan approved under Minister of the Navy Rafael Rodríguez de Arias Villavicencio in September 1887. Money originally intended to build torpedo boats was diverted to fund her construction, and the Spanish government awarded a contract for her construction to the Vea Murguía (which became Vea Murguía, Noriega y Cía in 1895) shipyard in Cádiz on 30 April 1891 with an initial budget of 18,850,000 pesetas. She was laid down on 4 March 1892. A tragedy related to her scheduled launching occurred when the protected cruiser Reina Regente, whose commanding officer was trying to steam from Tangier to Cádiz in time to attend the launching in person, sank in a storm with the loss of all hands on 10 March 1895. Emperador Carlos V was launched on 12 March 1895, a day before Reina Regente was declared overdue at Cádiz.

In April 1897, Emperador Carlos V conducted sea trials, but failed to reach her designed speed of 20 knots (37 km/h; 23 mph), and her range at economical cruising speed was calculated at 9,600 nautical miles (17,800 km; 11,000 mi) rather than the planned 12,000 nautical miles (22,000 km; 14,000 mi). She was delivered to the Spanish Navy without her main guns on 18 August 1897 — the largest ship built in a Spanish shipyard during the era — and headed for Le Havre, France, late in 1897 to have her main battery guns and gun turrets installed.

The Spanish-American War broke out when the United States declared war on Spain on 25 April 1898, stipulating that its declaration was retroactive to 21 April. This forced Emperador Carlos V to return to Spain before her main guns could be installed, and she was commissioned without them on 2 June 1898.

== Operational history ==
=== Spanish-American War ===
c. 1897 painting of Emperador Carlos V

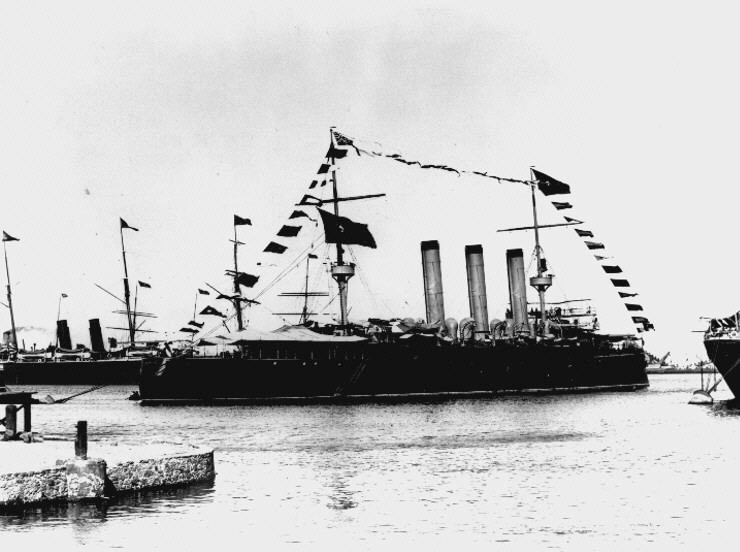
Emperador Carlos V in the Suez Canal in 1898. She is dressed overall.

Emperador Carlos V was assigned to the 2nd Squadron, commanded by Contralmirante (Counter Admiral) Manuel de la Cámara. After spending the war's first weeks lying idle in Spanish waters with a nominal mission of defending the Spanish coast, the squadron was ordered to steam to the Philippines and face the United States Navy's Asiatic Squadron, which had controlled Philippine waters since defeating the Spanish Navy's Pacific Squadron of Contralmirante (Counter Admiral) Patricio Montojo y Pasaron in the Battle of Manila Bay.

Camara's squadron — consisting of Emperador Carlos V, the battleship Pelayo, the auxiliary cruisers Patiota and Rapido, the destroyers Audaz, Osado, and Prosepina, and the transports Buenos Aires and Panay — sortied from Cádiz on 16 June 1898, passing Gibraltar on 17 June 1898. It arrived at Port Said, Egypt, on 26 June 1898, and requested permission to transship coal, which the Egyptian government finally denied on 30 June 1898 out of concern for Egyptian neutrality. By the time Camara's squadron arrived at Suez on 5 July 1898, the squadron of Vice Admiral Pascual Cervera y Topete had been annihilated in the Battle of Santiago de Cuba, freeing up the U.S. Navy's heavy forces from the blockade of Santiago de Cuba. Fearful of the security of the Spanish coast, the Spanish Ministry of Marine recalled Camara's squadron on 7 July 1898, and Emperador Carlos V returned to Spain, where Camara's 2nd Squadron was dissolved on 25 July 1898. Emperador Carlos V spent the rest of the war in Spanish waters, and hostilities ended on 13 August 1898 without her having had an opportunity to see combat.

=== 1898–1906 ===
After the war, Emperador Carlos V′s main guns finally were installed. In 1900, the Spanish Navy officially reclassified her as a "first-class protected cruiser." After she was selected to conduct trials of the "Subic" dock, so named because it had been intended for use at Manila before Spain lost the Philippines to the United States as a result of the SpanishAmerican War, she made a voyage from Barcelona to Mahón on Menorca in the Balearic Islands, where she arrived on the morning of 17 July 1901. She conducted the dock trials there in early August 1901, and the trials were a failure. In the early hours of 7 August 1901, she got underway for the Cantabrian Sea to join the main fleet along the northern coast of Spain.

In 1902, Emperador Carlos V took part in a naval review held to commemorate the coronation of the British King Edward VII. The Prince of Asturias, Carlos of Bourbon-Two Sicilies, who represented King Alfonso XIII of Spain at the coronation, was present at the review.

A squadron that included Emperador Carlos V, Pelayo, Audaz, the armored cruisers Cardenal Cisneros and Princesa de Asturias, the protected cruiser Extremadura, and the coastal defense ship Numancia got underway from the Balearic Islands on 13 June 1903 and proceeded to Cartagena, where it attended a visit to the city by King Alfonso XIII on 22 June. In the autumn of 1903, the squadron returned to the Balearic Islands, where it arrived at Mahón to carry out new trials of the "Subic" dock. The final trials began on 5 November 1903.

At 10:30 on 7 December 1903, Emperador Carlos V departed Vigo in company with Cardenal Cisneros and Osado bound for Lisbon, Portugal, to accompany King Alfonso XIII on his first official visit abroad. The ships arrived at Lisbon on 8 December. After the conclusion of the royal visit, Emperador Carlos V proceeded to Ferrol, which she reached on the morning of 20 December 1903.

Emperador Carlos V was part of squadron which received the Duke and Duchess of Connaught and Strathearn, Prince Arthur and Princess Louise Margaret, on 13 January 1905 when they arrived at Cádiz aboard the Royal Navy armoured cruiser HMS Essex. From 5 to 25 February 1905, the squadron visited Santa Cruz de Tenerife on Tenerife in the Canary Islands. It then returned to Spain.

The Training Squadron — which included Emperador Carlos V (serving as its flagship), Cardenal Cisneros, Extremadura, and Princesa de Asturias — anchored at Vigo on the afternoon of 25 March 1905. In the following weeks, Emperador Carlos V entered the naval shipyard at Ferrol to gave her bottom cleaned. She was in the Cantabrian Sea with the Training Squadron in late July 1905, then, after calling at Alicante and an overnight stop at Tarragona on 28–29 July before proceeding to Barcelona. She then conducted a cruise in the Mediterranean Sea that lasted until the end of 1905.

After the Algeciras Conference began on 16 January 1906, Emperador Carlos V was stationed off Algeciras in the Bay of Gibraltar. She departed Cartagena on 16 March 1906 in company with Pelayo, Princesa de Asturias, and the protected cruiser Río de la Plata and steamed to Cádiz, where other ships of the squadron joined them. On 23 March 1906 the Training Squadron got underway from Cádiz in two divisions — one consisting of Emperador Carlos V, Princesa de Asturias, and Osado and the other of Pelayo, Extramadura, and Río de la Plata. The squadron rendezvoused with the royal yacht Giralda and the Compañía Transatlántica Española passenger steamer Alfonso XII, the latter with the Spanish royal family and Minister of the Navy Víctor María Concas Palau aboard. They then escorted King Alfonso XIII on his visit to the Canary Islands, arriving at Tenerife on 26 March, at Las Palmas on 30 March, at Santa Cruz de la Palma on 3 April, and at Hierro Island on 4 April 1906. Alfonso XIII and the squadron returned to Cádiz on 7 April 1906.

On 3 November 1906, Emperador Carlos V and Princesa de Asturias completed a voyage from Cádiz to Málaga, where other ships of the Training Squadron joined them. The Spanish ships received a British Royal Navy squadron under the command of Prince Louis of Battenberg that arrived at Málaga from Gibraltar. The ships received a visit from King Alfonso XIII and Queen Victoria Eugenie. After the royal visit, Emperador Carlos V left Málaga and on 6 November 1906 anchored at Tangier, where several other Spanish warships also anchored over the following months as events unfolded in Morocco. Emperador Carlos V returned to Cádiz in company with Princesa de Asturias on 11 December 1906 to refuel, after which both cruisers returned to Tangier.

=== 1907–1909 ===
In April 1907, Emperador Carlos V and Princesa de Asturias tested a new wireless telegraphy system. Emperador Carlos V left Barcelona on 7 May 1907 bound for the Balearic Islands, where she made stops at Mahón on Menorca and Alcudia on Mallorca before returning to Barcelona on the night of 9 May 1907. In August 1907 she departed for Cádiz and then Tangier. Princesa de Asturias relieved her at Tangier in mid-September 1907, and she subsequently patrolled the coast of Morocco and rendezvoused with Extremadura at Casablanca in late September 1907.

On the afternoon of 16 January 1908 Emperador Carlos V left Cartagena and proceeded to Málaga, where she embarked artillery. After a stop at Cádiz, she unloaded the artillery and supplies at Melilla on the coast of North Africa. She returned to Cádiz on 22 January 1908. In June 1908 she deployed to Larache, and in July 1908 she steamed from Cádiz to Tétouan on the coast of Morocco. Serving as the flagship of Contralmirante (Counter Admiral) José Morgado, she left Cádiz on 16 October 1908 in company with Princesa de Asturias and Osado and arrived at Barcelona on 18 October, where other ships from the Training Squadron and a squadron of French warships also arrived to attend a visit to the city by King Alfonso XIII and Queen Victoria Eugenie. On 8 November she departed Barcelona with Princesa de Asturias, Audaz, and the armored cruiser Cataluña and proceeded to Cartagena to rejoin the Training Squadron. She departed Cartagena on 15 December 1908, stopped at Cádiz, and then arrived at Ferrol. She rejoined the Training Squadron on 21 December 1908.

On 9 July 29, 1909, fighting broke out between Spanish forces and Rifians in northern Morocco in the vicinity of Melilla, beginning the second Melillan campaign. On 29 July, Emperador Carlos V rendezvoused with Princesa de Asturias, Audaz, Osado, and Proserpina at Barcelona. On 31 July, they crossed the Strait of Gibraltar to patrol the coast of Morocco. They returned to Barcelona on 2 August, their arrival coinciding with the last day of an uprising in Spain known as Tragic Week. Emperador Carlos V, Princesa de Asturias, and Osado departed Barcelona on 13 August 1909 and returned the area of operations around Melilla on 18 August. Other Spanish warships joined them to form a squadron that supported Spanish Army operations ashore. In late August 1909, Emperador Carlos V headed for the Chafarinas Islands in the Alboran Sea off Morocco, and she continued operations off North Africa until she returned to Barcelona in October 1909. The campaign ended on 4 December 1909.

=== 1910–1931 ===
In 1910, Infanta Isabel, Countess of Girgenti, representing King Alfonso XIII, visited Argentina to commemorate the 100th anniversary of its independence, traveling aboard the Compañía Transatlántica Española passenger steamer Alfonso XII. Emperador Carlos V escorted her during her journey.

Late in April 1911, a French intervention in Morocco took place, leading to the Agadir Crisis between France and the German Empire, which began in July 1911. Anticipating a crisis when the French intervened, the Spanish Ministry of the Navy ordered the Training Squadron to concentrate at Cádiz, and Emperador Carlos V, Cataluña, Princesa de Asturias, Extremadura, Río de la Plata, Audaz, the protected cruiser Reina Regente, the unprotected cruiser Infanta Isabel, the destroyer Terror, the gunboats Álvaro de Bazán and Doña María de Molina, and the transport Almirante Lobo gathered there along with a large number of Spanish Marine Infantry troops. The force conducted various amphibious landing exercises in the following days, but the crisis came to an end in November 1911 without the need for a Spanish military intervention.

On 29 January 1912, Emperador Carlos V departed Cádiz bound for Algeciras in company with Pelayo, Audaz, and Osado. The four ships proceeded on 30 January to Gibraltar, where they were on hand to receive King George V and Queen Mary of the United Kingdom during their return voyage from India.

Emperador Carlos V, Cataluña, and Princesa de Asturias took part in a naval parade before King Alfonso XIII, Queen Victoria Eugenie, and the admiral commanding the Spanish fleet at Santander on 12 July 1912, during which sailors from the ships and troops of the Spanish Marine Infantry paraded before the dignitaries. In late September 1912, Emperador Carlos V proceeded to Cádiz in company with Cataluña, Princesa de Asturias, and Osado.

Emperador Carlos V conducted gunnery exercises off Torre García between 13 and 16 March 1913. On 1 May 1913, she got underway from Cádiz with the Training Squadron and proceeded to Ferrol to attend the launching of the protected cruiser Alfonso XIII. In early October 1913, the ships of the Training Squadron gathered at Cartagena to attend a visit by the President of France, Raymond Poincaré.

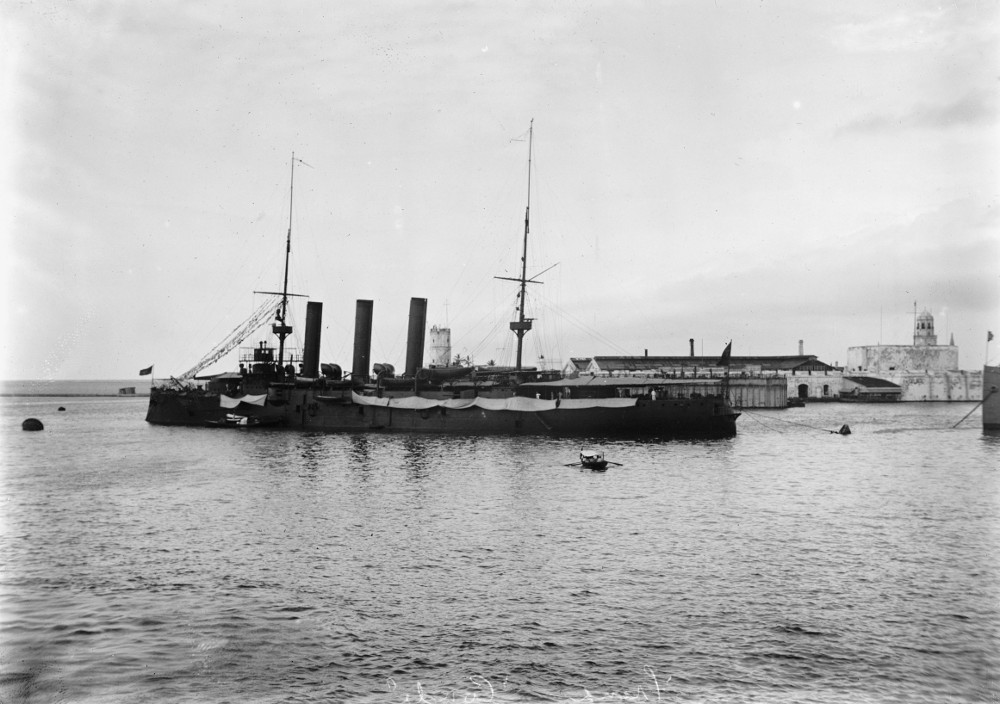
Emperador Carlos V in 1914.

In December 1913, Emperador Carlos V anchored at Veracruz, Mexico, to protect to Spanish interests during the Mexican Revolution. She was present at the United States occupation of Veracruz, which began on 21 April 1914. She visited New York City in 1914 and returned to Spain in September 1914.

From 1916, Emperador Carlos V was used as a training ship, and she made one instructional voyage. In 1923, she was hulked at Ferrol, where she served as a training school for seamen, torpedomen, and electricians. She was decommissioned on 5 December 1931.

== Final disposition ==
After decommissioning, Emperador Carlos V was anchored at Ferrol, where she served as floating jetty. She was stricken from the naval register in 1932 and scrapped in the Bilbao estuary early in 1933.
