= Chief of Staff of the Navy (Spain) =

Highest-ranking military officer of the Spanish Navy

- Jefe de Estado Mayor de la Armada
- Emblem of the General Staff of the Navy

- Flag of the Admiral Chief of Staff of the Navy

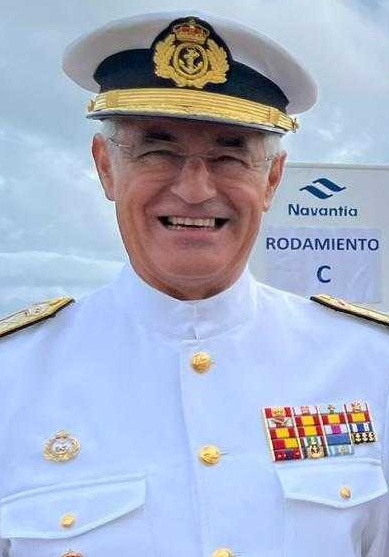
- Incumbent; Antonio Piñeiro Sánchez since 25 April 2023
- Naval Staff; Ministry of Defence
- Style: The Most Excellent
- Type: Highest-ranking officer in the Navy
- Abbreviation: AJEMA
- Member of: Naval Staff; National Defence Council; Council of Chiefs of Staff
- Reports to: Minister of Defence
- Seat: Spanish Navy Headquarters, Madrid
- Nominator: Defence Minister; After being discussed in the Council of Ministers
- Appointer: Monarch; Countersigned by the Defence Minister
- Term length: No fixed term
- Constituting instrument: Royal Decree of 13 July 1895
- Formation: 13 July 1895; 131 years ago
- First holder: Zoilo Sánchez de Ocaña y Vieitiz
- Deputy: Second Admiral Chief of Staff of the Navy
- Website: (in Spanish) Website of the Spanish Navy Staff

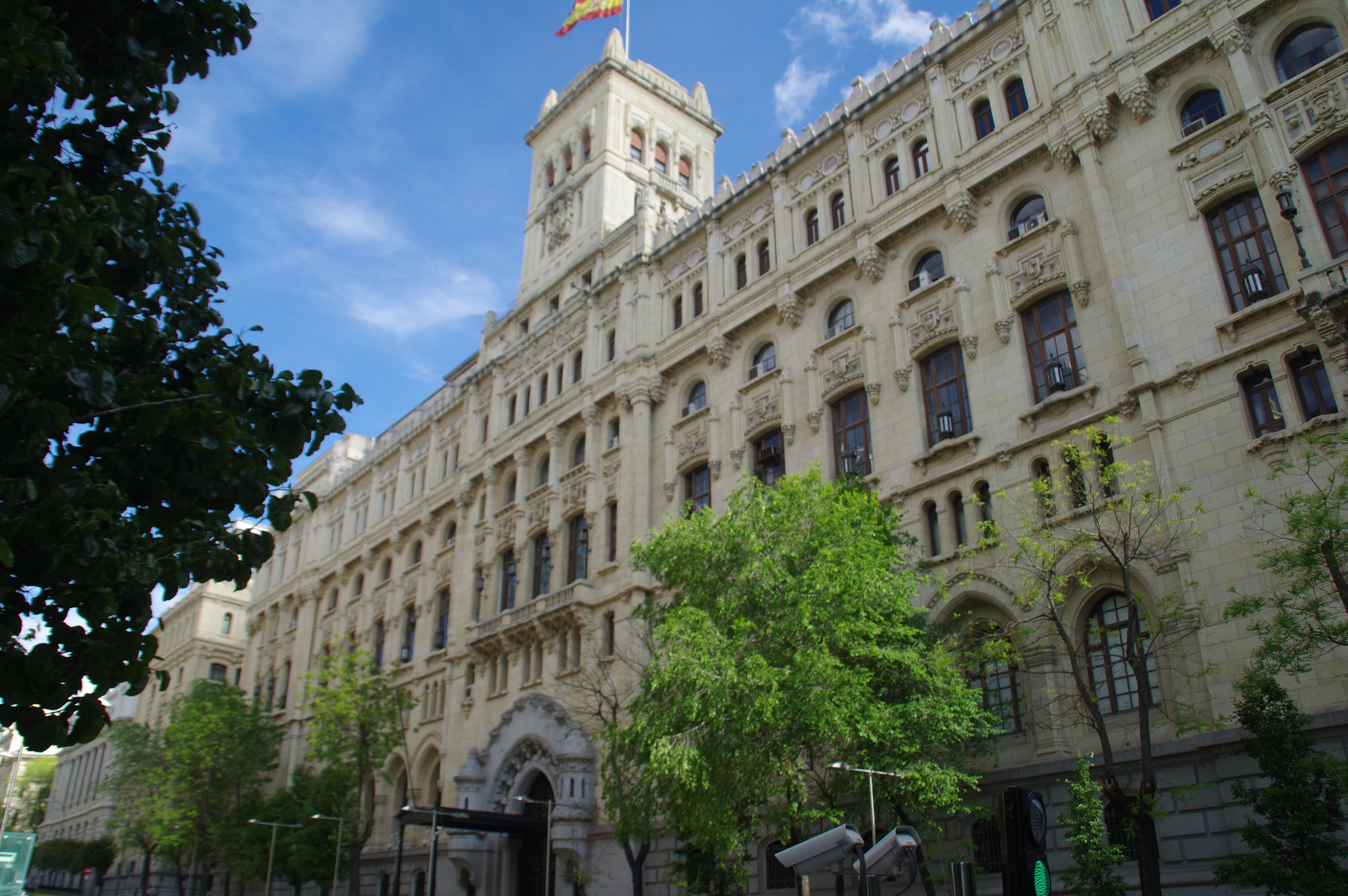
Spanish Navy Headquarters

The Chief of Staff of the Navy or Admiral Chief of Staff of the Navy (AJEMA) is the highest-ranking military officer of the Spanish Navy that, under the authority of the Defence Minister, exercises command over the naval branch and, as such, is the principal military advisor to the Chief of the Defence Staff, the Minister of Defence, the Secretary of State for Defence, the Under-Secretary of Defence and the National Defence Council.

The JEMA has two main roles: the support role by which advice the Minister of Defence about the naval military policy, the JEMAD about how to use the personnel and their operative status, the SEDEF about the economic, armamentistic and infrastructure policies and the SUBDEF about the personnel and teaching policy and the operative role by which prepare the force for combat, instructs the military personnel, establishes the organization of its military branch and watches over the welfare of the personnel under his command and evaluates the needs of the Navy.

The AJEMA calls the meetings and coordinates the efforts of the Naval Staff (EMA), the main auxiliary body of the AJEMA, which assists him in the exercise of its competences and in the responsibilities assigned to it over the organization of the Navy, preparation of the troops and administration of the assigned resources. The EMA has a whole body of military officers at its service, and among the main officers include the Second Admiral Chief of Staff of the Navy, the Admiral of the Fleet (ALFLOT), the Admiral of Naval Action (ALNAV), the Admiral of Maritime Action (ALMART), the General Commander of the Marines (COMGEIM), the Commander of the Naval Air Fleet (COMFLOAN) and the General Commander of the Submarines Fleet (COMSUBMAR).

After the death of Admiral General Antonio Martorell Lacave on 31 March 2023, Admiral Carlos Martínez-Merello y Díaz de Miranda, second admiral chief of staff of the navy assumes the office ad interim.

== History ==
The position of AJEMA was created on 13 July 1895 at the same time as the Naval Staff, which replaced the position of Under Secretary of the Navy. The office was reserved for officers with a minimum position of Rear admiral (Contraalmirante).

By Royal decree of 30 March 1899, the Undersecretary of the Navy was re-created and assumed the competences of the Military Secretariat and the Naval Staff, passing its owner to be called Under secretary of the Navy and Chief of the Central Naval Staff. The AJEMA position finally disappeared in 1900.

In December 1902, the Central Staff of the Navy (EMCA) was created, whose top official was once again a Chief under the name Chief of the Central Naval Staff. It was abolished again in August 1903. By the Law of 7 January 1908, which reforms the Institutes, agencies and services of the Navy, the EMCA was once again created. The AJEMA was granted the chair of the Board that informed the Minister of the Navy of naval matters, except if he did not possess the rank of Vice Admiral, which was then chaired by the Vice Admiral Chief of the Central Jurisdiction of the Navy and the AJEMA acted as a member. This law was developed by the Regulation of 17 January, which limited this position to officers of the rank of Vice Admiral or Rear Admiral.

On 20 October 1927, the EMCA is replaced by the Directorate-General of Campaign and Services of the Naval Staff (DGCSEM) in front of which there was a Vice Admiral with the title of Director-General of the same body. On 15 October 1930, the DGCSEM is suppressed, the Naval Staff (EMA) is created again and with it, Chief of Staff of the navy (on which the Naval War College directly depended), although it will not be until December 1930 that the name of the Director-General passes to that of AJEMA.

During the Civil War, each side of the conflict established its own Naval Staff. While the rebellious side maintained the Naval Staff, the Republican side had mainly the Marine Staff, although briefly the Central Staff of the Naval Forces of the Republic was created afterwards.

After the end of the civil war, the Francoism divided again the ministries destined to the defense in three, one for each army branch and maintained the Naval Staff that is maintained until today with the Chief or Admiral Chief of Staff of the Navy in front.

== List of officeholders ==
No.	Rank	Name	Appointed	Dismissed	Minister of the Navy	Prime Minister	Head of State
1º	Rear admiral	Zoilo Sánchez de Ocaña y Vieitiz	14 July 1895	19 March 1896	José María Beránger	Antonio Cánovas del Castillo	Alfonso XIII
2º	Rear admiral	Fernando Martínez de Espinosa y Echeverri	19 March 1896	22 October 1896	José María Beránger	Antonio Cánovas del Castillo	Alfonso XIII
3º	Rear admiral	Segismundo Bermejo y Merelo	22 October 1896	1 April 1897	José María Beránger	Antonio Cánovas del Castillo	Alfonso XIII
4º	Rear admiral	Ismael Warleta Ordovás	20 August 1897	†9 August 1898	José María Beránger	Antonio Cánovas del Castillo	Alfonso XIII
4º	Rear admiral	Ismael Warleta Ordovás	20 August 1897	†9 August 1898	José María Beránger	Marcelo Azcárraga Palmero (Note: As acting prime minister from 8 August to 21 August 1897)	Alfonso XIII
4º	Rear admiral	Ismael Warleta Ordovás	20 August 1897	†9 August 1898	Segismundo Bermejo	Práxedes Mateo Sagasta	Alfonso XIII
4º	Rear admiral	Ismael Warleta Ordovás	20 August 1897	†9 August 1898	Ramón Auñón y Villalón	Práxedes Mateo Sagasta	Alfonso XIII
5º	Rear admiral	Manuel Mozo y Díaz Robles	30 March 1899	25 October 1899	Ramón Auñón y Villalón	Práxedes Mateo Sagasta	Alfonso XIII
5º	Rear admiral	Manuel Mozo y Díaz Robles	30 March 1899	25 October 1899	Francisco Silvela		Alfonso XIII
6º	Rear admiral	Antonio Terry y Rivas	25 October 1899	20 April 1900	Francisco Silvela		Alfonso XIII
7º	Ship-of-the-line captain	Antonio Moreno de Guerra y Cróquer	20 April 1900	7 November 1900	Francisco Silvela		Alfonso XIII
7º	Ship-of-the-line captain	Antonio Moreno de Guerra y Cróquer	20 April 1900	7 November 1900	Marcelo Azcárraga Palmero	Marcelo Azcárraga Palmero	Alfonso XIII
7º	Ship-of-the-line captain	Antonio Moreno de Guerra y Cróquer	20 April 1900	7 November 1900	José Ramos Izquierdo	Marcelo Azcárraga Palmero	Alfonso XIII
8º	Rear admiral	José María Pilón y Sterling	20 April 1900	7 November 1900	José Ramos Izquierdo	Marcelo Azcárraga Palmero	Alfonso XIII
9º	Vice admiral	Pascual Cervera y Topete	28 December 1902	19 August 1903	Joaquín Sánchez de Toca	Francisco Silvela	Alfonso XIII
9º	Vice admiral	Pascual Cervera y Topete	28 December 1902	19 August 1903	Eduardo Cobián	Raimundo Fernández Villaverde	Alfonso XIII
10º	Rear Admiral	Federico Estrán y Justo	17 January 1908	10 June 1909	José Ferrándiz y Niño	Antonio Maura	Alfonso XIII
11º	Rear Admiral	José de la Puente y Bassave	10 June 1909	19 April 1910	José Ferrándiz y Niño	Antonio Maura	Alfonso XIII
11º	Rear Admiral	José de la Puente y Bassave	10 June 1909	19 April 1910	Víctor María Concas	Segismundo Moret	Alfonso XIII
11º	Rear Admiral	José de la Puente y Bassave	10 June 1909	19 April 1910	Diego Arias de Miranda	José Canalejas	Alfonso XIII
12º	Vice Admiral	Joaquín María de Cincúnegui y Marco	19 April 1910	27 September 1912	Diego Arias de Miranda	José Canalejas	Alfonso XIII
12º	Vice Admiral	Joaquín María de Cincúnegui y Marco	19 April 1910	27 September 1912	José Pidal Rebollo	José Canalejas	Alfonso XIII
13º	Vice Admiral	Francisco Chacón y Pery	27 September 1912	4 July 1913	José Pidal Rebollo	José Canalejas	Alfonso XIII
13º	Vice Admiral	Francisco Chacón y Pery	27 September 1912	4 July 1913	José Pidal Rebollo	Manuel García Prieto (acting)	Alfonso XIII
13º	Vice Admiral	Francisco Chacón y Pery	27 September 1912	4 July 1913	José Pidal Rebollo	Count of Romanones	Alfonso XIII
13º	Vice Admiral	Francisco Chacón y Pery	27 September 1912	4 July 1913	Amalio Gimeno y Cabañas	Count of Romanones	Alfonso XIII
14º	Admiral	Antonio Perea y Orive	5 July 1913	5 September 1914	Amalio Gimeno y Cabañas	Count of Romanones	Alfonso XIII
14º	Admiral	Antonio Perea y Orive	5 July 1913	5 September 1914	Augusto Miranda y Godoy	Eduardo Dato	Alfonso XIII
15º	Vice Admiral	Orestes García de Paadín y García	5 September 1914	19 January 1915	Augusto Miranda y Godoy	Eduardo Dato	Alfonso XIII
16º	Admiral	José Pidal Rebollo	19 January 1915	23 March 1918	Augusto Miranda y Godoy	Eduardo Dato	Alfonso XIII
16º	Admiral	José Pidal Rebollo	19 January 1915	23 March 1918	Augusto Miranda y Godoy	Count of Romanones	Alfonso XIII
16º	Admiral	José Pidal Rebollo	19 January 1915	23 March 1918	Augusto Miranda y Godoy	Manuel García Prieto	Alfonso XIII
16º	Admiral	José Pidal Rebollo	19 January 1915	23 March 1918	Manuel de Flórez y Carrió	Eduardo Dato	Alfonso XIII
16º	Admiral	José Pidal Rebollo	19 January 1915	23 March 1918	Amalio Gimeno y Cabañas	Manuel García Prieto	Alfonso XIII
16º	Admiral	José Pidal Rebollo	19 January 1915	23 March 1918	José Pidal Rebollo	Antonio Maura	Alfonso XIII
17º	Admiral	Adriano Sánchez Lobatón	24 March 1918	21 November 1919	José Pidal Rebollo	Antonio Maura	Alfonso XIII
17º	Admiral	Adriano Sánchez Lobatón	24 March 1918	21 November 1919	Augusto Miranda y Godoy	Antonio Maura	Alfonso XIII
17º	Admiral	Adriano Sánchez Lobatón	24 March 1918	21 November 1919	José María Chacón y Pery	Manuel García Prieto	Alfonso XIII
17º	Admiral	Adriano Sánchez Lobatón	24 March 1918	21 November 1919	José María Chacón y Pery	Count of Romanones	Alfonso XIII
17º	Admiral	Adriano Sánchez Lobatón	24 March 1918	21 November 1919	Augusto Miranda y Godoy	Antonio Maura	Alfonso XIII
17º	Admiral	Adriano Sánchez Lobatón	24 March 1918	21 November 1919	Manuel de Flórez y Carrió	Joaquín Sánchez de Toca	Alfonso XIII
18º	Admiral	José María Chacón y Pery	21 November 1919	13 May 1920	Manuel de Flórez y Carrió	Joaquín Sánchez de Toca	Alfonso XIII
18º	Admiral	José María Chacón y Pery	21 November 1919	13 May 1920	Manuel de Flórez y Carrió	Manuel Allendesalazar	Alfonso XIII
18º	Admiral	José María Chacón y Pery	21 November 1919	13 May 1920	Manuel Allendesalazar (acting)	Manuel Allendesalazar	Alfonso XIII
18º	Admiral	José María Chacón y Pery	21 November 1919	13 May 1920	Eduardo Dato		Alfonso XIII
19º	Admiral	Gabriel Antón Iboleón	13 May 1920	† 2 February 1924	Eduardo Dato		Alfonso XIII
19º	Admiral	Gabriel Antón Iboleón	13 May 1920	† 2 February 1924	Luis Marichalar y Monreal	Gabino Bugallal(acting)	Alfonso XIII
19º	Admiral	Gabriel Antón Iboleón	13 May 1920	† 2 February 1924	Joaquín Fernández Prida	Manuel Allendesalazar	Alfonso XIII
19º	Admiral	Gabriel Antón Iboleón	13 May 1920	† 2 February 1924	José Gómez Acebo	Antonio Maura	Alfonso XIII
19º	Admiral	Gabriel Antón Iboleón	13 May 1920	† 2 February 1924	Mariano Ordóñez García	José Sánchez-Guerra	Alfonso XIII
19º	Admiral	Gabriel Antón Iboleón	13 May 1920	† 2 February 1924	José Rivera Álvarez de Canero	José Sánchez-Guerra	Alfonso XIII
19º	Admiral	Gabriel Antón Iboleón	13 May 1920	† 2 February 1924	Luis Silvela Casado	Manuel García Prieto	Alfonso XIII
19º	Admiral	Gabriel Antón Iboleón	13 May 1920	† 2 February 1924	Juan Bautista Aznar	Manuel García Prieto	Alfonso XIII
19º	Admiral	Gabriel Antón Iboleón	13 May 1920	† 2 February 1924	Gabriel Antón Iboleón	Miguel Primo de Rivera	Alfonso XIII
19º	Admiral	Gabriel Antón Iboleón	13 May 1920	† 2 February 1924	Federico Ibáñez Valera	Miguel Primo de Rivera	Alfonso XIII
19º	Admiral	Gabriel Antón Iboleón	13 May 1920	† 2 February 1924	Ignacio Pintado Gough	Miguel Primo de Rivera	Alfonso XIII
19º	Admiral	Gabriel Antón Iboleón	13 May 1920	† 2 February 1924	Honorio Cornejo Carvajal	Miguel Primo de Rivera	Alfonso XIII
20º	Admiral	Ignacio Pintado Gough	8 February 1924	10 June 1924	Honorio Cornejo Carvajal	Miguel Primo de Rivera	Alfonso XIII
21º	Admiral	Juan Carranza y Garrido	10 June 1924	4 May 1927	Honorio Cornejo Carvajal	Miguel Primo de Rivera	Alfonso XIII
22º	Admiral	José Rivera Álvarez de Canero	4 May 1927	28 November 1927	Honorio Cornejo Carvajal	Miguel Primo de Rivera	Alfonso XIII
23º	Vice Admiral	José Núñez y Quijano	28 October 1930	22 December 1930	Honorio Cornejo Carvajal	Miguel Primo de Rivera	Alfonso XIII
23º	Vice Admiral	José Núñez y Quijano	28 October 1930	22 December 1930	Mateo García de Los Reyes	Miguel Primo de Rivera	Alfonso XIII
23º	Vice Admiral	José Núñez y Quijano	28 October 1930	22 December 1930	Salvador Carvia Caravaca	Dámaso Berenguer	Alfonso XIII
24º	Vice Admiral	Juan Cervera Valderrama	28 November 1927	21 August 1931	Salvador Carvia Caravaca	Dámaso Berenguer	Alfonso XIII
24º	Vice Admiral	Juan Cervera Valderrama	28 November 1927	21 August 1931	José Rivera Álvarez de Canero	Juan Bautista-Aznar	Alfonso XIII
24º	Vice Admiral	Juan Cervera Valderrama	28 November 1927	21 August 1931	Santiago Casares Quiroga	President of the Provisional Government	Niceto Alcalá-Zamora
24º	Vice Admiral	Juan Cervera Valderrama	28 November 1927	21 August 1931	Santiago Casares Quiroga	Niceto Alcalá-Zamora	Niceto Alcalá-Zamora
24º	Vice Admiral	Juan Cervera Valderrama	28 November 1927	21 August 1931	José Giral	Manuel Azaña	Niceto Alcalá-Zamora
25º	Vice Admiral	Francisco Javier de Salas González	25 September 1931 (Note: During his tenure as the naval department head, the Second Chief of Staff was in charge of the general naval staff.)	19 July 1936	José Giral	Prime Minister	Niceto Alcalá-Zamora
	Vice Admiral	Francisco Javier de Salas González	25 September 1931	19 July 1936	José Giral	Manuel Azaña	Niceto Alcalá-Zamora
	Vice Admiral	Francisco Javier de Salas González	25 September 1931	19 July 1936	Lluís Companys	Manuel Azaña	Niceto Alcalá-Zamora
	Vice Admiral	Francisco Javier de Salas González	25 September 1931	19 July 1936	Vicente Iranzo Enguita	Alejandro Lerroux	Niceto Alcalá-Zamora
	Vice Admiral	Francisco Javier de Salas González	25 September 1931	19 July 1936	Leandro Pita Romero	Diego Martínez Barrio	Niceto Alcalá-Zamora
	Vice Admiral	Francisco Javier de Salas González	25 September 1931	19 July 1936	Juan José Rocha García	Alejandro Lerroux	Niceto Alcalá-Zamora
	Vice Admiral	Francisco Javier de Salas González	25 September 1931	19 July 1936	Juan José Rocha García	Ricardo Samper	Niceto Alcalá-Zamora
	Vice Admiral	Francisco Javier de Salas González	25 September 1931	19 July 1936	Juan José Rocha García	Alejandro Lerroux	Niceto Alcalá-Zamora
	Vice Admiral	Francisco Javier de Salas González	25 September 1931	19 July 1936	Gerardo Abad Conde	Alejandro Lerroux	Niceto Alcalá-Zamora
	Vice Admiral	Francisco Javier de Salas González	25 September 1931	19 July 1936	Francisco Javier de Salas González	Alejandro Lerroux	Niceto Alcalá-Zamora
	Vice Admiral	Francisco Javier de Salas González	25 September 1931	19 July 1936	Antonio Royo Villanova	Alejandro Lerroux	Niceto Alcalá-Zamora
	Vice Admiral	Francisco Javier de Salas González	25 September 1931	19 July 1936	Pedro Rahola Molinas	Joaquín Chapaprieta	Niceto Alcalá-Zamora
	Vice Admiral	Francisco Javier de Salas González	25 September 1931	19 July 1936	Francisco Javier de Salas González	Manuel Portela Valladares	Niceto Alcalá-Zamora
	Vice Admiral	Francisco Javier de Salas González	25 September 1931	19 July 1936	Antonio Azarola y Gresillón	Manuel Portela Valladares	Niceto Alcalá-Zamora
	Vice Admiral	Francisco Javier de Salas González	25 September 1931	19 July 1936	José Giral	Manuel Azaña	Niceto Alcalá-Zamora
	Vice Admiral	Francisco Javier de Salas González	25 September 1931	19 July 1936	José Giral	Manuel Azaña	Diego Martínez Barrio (acting)
	Vice Admiral	Francisco Javier de Salas González	25 September 1931	19 July 1936	José Giral	Manuel Azaña	Manuel Azaña
	Vice Admiral	Francisco Javier de Salas González	25 September 1931	19 July 1936	José Giral	Augusto Barcía Trelles (acting)	Manuel Azaña
	Vice Admiral	Francisco Javier de Salas González	25 September 1931	19 July 1936	José Giral	Santiago Casares Quiroga	Manuel Azaña
	Vice Admiral	Francisco Javier de Salas González	25 September 1931	19 July 1936	José Giral	Diego Martínez Barrio	Manuel Azaña
Beginning of the Spanish Civil War							
Vacant from 19 July – 2 September 1936							
Disputed	Corvette captain	(Second Spanish Republic) Miguel Buiza Fernández-Palacios (Note: Chief of the Naval Staff from December 1937 and 18 April 1938.) (Note: Chief of the Naval Staff: Valentín Fuentes López (26 October–26 December 1937); Miguel Buiza Fernández-Palacios (26 December 1937–18 April 1938); Pedro Prado Mendizábal (18 April 1938–22 January 1939); Julián Sánchez Erostarbe (22 January 1939–1 April 1939))	2 September 1936	27 October 1937	José Giral	José Giral	Manuel Azaña
Disputed	Corvette captain	(Second Spanish Republic) Miguel Buiza Fernández-Palacios	2 September 1936	27 October 1937	Francisco Matz Sánchez	José Giral	Manuel Azaña
Disputed	Corvette captain	(Second Spanish Republic) Miguel Buiza Fernández-Palacios	2 September 1936	27 October 1937	Minister of Navy and Air	Francisco Largo Caballero	Manuel Azaña
Disputed	Corvette captain	(Second Spanish Republic) Miguel Buiza Fernández-Palacios	2 September 1936	27 October 1937	Indalecio Prieto	Francisco Largo Caballero	Manuel Azaña
Disputed	Corvette captain	(Second Spanish Republic) Miguel Buiza Fernández-Palacios	2 September 1936	27 October 1937	Minister of Defence	Juan Negrín	Manuel Azaña
Disputed	Corvette captain	(Second Spanish Republic) Miguel Buiza Fernández-Palacios	2 September 1936	27 October 1937	Indalecio Prieto	Juan Negrín	Manuel Azaña
Disputed	Corvette captain	(Second Spanish Republic) Luis González de Ubieta	27 October 1937	8 January 1939	Indalecio Prieto	Juan Negrín	Manuel Azaña
Disputed	Corvette captain	(Second Spanish Republic) Luis González de Ubieta	27 October 1937	8 January 1939	Juan Negrín	Juan Negrín	Manuel Azaña
Disputed	Ship-of-the-line captain	(Second Spanish Republic) Miguel Buiza Fernández-Palacios (2nd term)	8 January 1939	5 March 1939	Juan Negrín	Juan Negrín	Manuel Azaña
Disputed	Admiral	(Francoist Spain) Juan Cervera Valderrama (2nd term)	28 October 1936	1 April 1939	Minister of the Navy	President of the State Technical Junta	Francisco Franco
Disputed	Admiral	(Francoist Spain) Juan Cervera Valderrama (2nd term)	28 October 1936	1 April 1939	No minister	Fidel Dávila Arrondo	Francisco Franco
Disputed	Admiral	(Francoist Spain) Juan Cervera Valderrama (2nd term)	28 October 1936	1 April 1939	No minister	Francisco Gómez-Jordana Sousa	Francisco Franco
Disputed	Admiral	(Francoist Spain) Juan Cervera Valderrama (2nd term)	28 October 1936	1 April 1939	Minister of Defence	Prime Minister	Francisco Franco
Disputed	Admiral	(Francoist Spain) Juan Cervera Valderrama (2nd term)	28 October 1936	1 April 1939	Fidel Dávila Arrondo	Francisco Franco	Francisco Franco
End of the Civil War							
26º	Admiral	Juan Cervera Valderrama	1 April 1939	16 August 1939	Minister of the Navy	Francisco Franco	
26º	Admiral	Juan Cervera Valderrama	1 April 1939	16 August 1939	Salvador Moreno Fernández	Francisco Franco	
Functions assumed by the Ministry of the Navy from 16 August 1939 to 23 September 1942					Salvador Moreno Fernández	Francisco Franco	
27º	Admiral	Alfonso Arriaga Adam	23 September 1942	26 March 1951	Salvador Moreno Fernández	Francisco Franco	
27º	Admiral	Alfonso Arriaga Adam	23 September 1942	26 March 1951	Francisco Regalado	Francisco Franco	
28º	Admiral	Rafael Estrada Arnaiz	26 March 1951	17 October 1952	Francisco Regalado	Francisco Franco	
28º	Admiral	Rafael Estrada Arnaiz	26 March 1951	17 October 1952	Salvador Moreno Fernández	Francisco Franco	
29º	Admiral	Juan Pastor Tomasety	24 October 1952	26 July 1956	Salvador Moreno Fernández	Francisco Franco	
30º	Admiral	Felipe José de Abárzuza y Oliva	21 August 1956	25 February 1957	Salvador Moreno Fernández	Francisco Franco	
31º	Admiral	Santiago Antón Rozas	4 May 1957	17 January 1963	Felipe José Abárzuza	Francisco Franco	
31º	Admiral	Santiago Antón Rozas	4 May 1957	17 January 1963	Pedro Nieto Antúnez	Francisco Franco	
32º	Admiral	Jerónimo Bustamante de la Rocha	17 January 1963	10 August 1963	Pedro Nieto Antúnez	Francisco Franco	
33º	Admiral	Fernando Meléndez Bojaro	10 August 1963	25 February 1966	Pedro Nieto Antúnez	Francisco Franco	
34º	Admiral	Rafael Fernández de Bobadilla y Ragel	26 February 1966	6 May 1967	Pedro Nieto Antúnez	Francisco Franco	
35º	Admiral	Adolfo Baturone Colombo	6 May 1967	29 October 1969	Pedro Nieto Antúnez	Francisco Franco	
36º	Admiral	Enrique Barbudo Duarte	7 November 1969	7 July 1972	Adolfo Baturone Colombo	Francisco Franco	
37º	Admiral	Gabriel Pita da Veiga y Sanz	7 July 1972	22 June 1973	Adolfo Baturone Colombo	Francisco Franco	
37º	Admiral	Gabriel Pita da Veiga y Sanz	7 July 1972	22 June 1973	Gabriel Pita da Veiga	Luis Carrero Blanco	Francisco Franco
38º	Admiral	José Ramón González López	22 June 1973	27 September 1975	Gabriel Pita da Veiga	Luis Carrero Blanco	Francisco Franco
38º	Admiral	José Ramón González López	22 June 1973	27 September 1975	Gabriel Pita da Veiga	Torcuato Fernández-Miranda (acting)	Francisco Franco
38º	Admiral	José Ramón González López	22 June 1973	27 September 1975	Gabriel Pita da Veiga	Carlos Arias Navarro	Francisco Franco
39º	Admiral (*)	Carlos Buhigas García	27 September 1975	19 November 1977	Gabriel Pita da Veiga	Carlos Arias Navarro	Francisco Franco
39º	Admiral (*)	Carlos Buhigas García	27 September 1975	19 November 1977	Gabriel Pita da Veiga	Carlos Arias Navarro	Regency Council
39º	Admiral (*)	Carlos Buhigas García	27 September 1975	19 November 1977	Gabriel Pita da Veiga	Carlos Arias Navarro	Juan Carlos I
39º	Admiral (*)	Carlos Buhigas García	27 September 1975	19 November 1977	Gabriel Pita da Veiga	Fernando de Santiago (acting)	Juan Carlos I
39º	Admiral (*)	Carlos Buhigas García	27 September 1975	19 November 1977	Pascual Pery	Adolfo Suárez	Juan Carlos I
39º	Admiral (*)	Carlos Buhigas García	27 September 1975	19 November 1977	Minister of Defence	Adolfo Suárez	Juan Carlos I
39º	Admiral (*)	Carlos Buhigas García	27 September 1975	19 November 1977	Manuel Gutiérrez Mellado	Adolfo Suárez	Juan Carlos I
40º	Admiral (*)	Luis Arévalo Pelluz	23 November 1977	15 January 1982	Manuel Gutiérrez Mellado	Adolfo Suárez	Juan Carlos I
40º	Admiral (*)	Luis Arévalo Pelluz	23 November 1977	15 January 1982	Agustín Rodríguez Sahagún	Adolfo Suárez	Juan Carlos I
40º	Admiral (*)	Luis Arévalo Pelluz	23 November 1977	15 January 1982	Alberto Oliart	Leopoldo Calvo-Sotelo	Juan Carlos I
41º	Admiral (**)	Saturnino Suanzes de la Hidalga	15 January 1982	11 January 1984	Alberto Oliart	Leopoldo Calvo-Sotelo	Juan Carlos I
41º	Admiral (**)	Saturnino Suanzes de la Hidalga	15 January 1982	11 January 1984	Narcís Serra	Felipe González	Juan Carlos I
42º	Admiral (*)	Guillermo Salas Cardenal	11 January 1984	31 October 1986	Narcís Serra	Felipe González	Juan Carlos I
43º	Admiral (**)	Fernando María Nárdiz Vial	31 October 1986	18 May 1990	Narcís Serra	Felipe González	Juan Carlos I
44º	Admiral (**)	Carlos Vila Miranda	18 May 1990	14 February 1994	Narcís Serra	Felipe González	Juan Carlos I
44º	Admiral (**)	Carlos Vila Miranda	18 May 1990	14 February 1994	Julián García Vargas	Felipe González	Juan Carlos I
45º	Admiral (**)	Juan José Romero Caramelo	14 February 1994	27 June 1997	Gustavo Suárez Pertierra	Felipe González	Juan Carlos I
45º	Admiral (**)	Juan José Romero Caramelo	14 February 1994	27 June 1997	Eduardo Serra Rexach	José María Aznar	Juan Carlos I
46º	Admiral (***)	Antonio Moreno Barberá	27 June 1997	15 December 2000	Eduardo Serra Rexach	José María Aznar	Juan Carlos I
46º	Admiral (***)	Antonio Moreno Barberá	27 June 1997	15 December 2000	Federico Trillo	José María Aznar	Juan Carlos I
47º	Admiral General	Francisco José Torrente Sánchez	16 December 2000	30 April 2004	Federico Trillo	José María Aznar	Juan Carlos I
47º	Admiral General	Francisco José Torrente Sánchez	16 December 2000	30 April 2004	José Bono	José Luis Rodríguez Zapatero	Juan Carlos I
48º	Admiral General	Sebastián Zaragoza Soto	30 April 2004	18 July 2008	José Bono	José Luis Rodríguez Zapatero	Juan Carlos I
48º	Admiral General	Sebastián Zaragoza Soto	30 April 2004	18 July 2008	José Antonio Alonso	José Luis Rodríguez Zapatero	Juan Carlos I
48º	Admiral General	Sebastián Zaragoza Soto	30 April 2004	18 July 2008	Carme Chacón	José Luis Rodríguez Zapatero	Juan Carlos I
49º	Admiral General	Manuel Rebollo García	18 July 2008	27 July 2012	Carme Chacón	José Luis Rodríguez Zapatero	Juan Carlos I
49º	Admiral General	Manuel Rebollo García	18 July 2008	27 July 2012	Pedro Morenés	Mariano Rajoy	Juan Carlos I
50º	Admiral General	Jaime Muñoz-Delgado y Díaz del Río	27 July 2012	1 April 2017	Pedro Morenés	Mariano Rajoy	Juan Carlos I
50º	Admiral General	Jaime Muñoz-Delgado y Díaz del Río	27 July 2012	1 April 2017	María Dolores de Cospedal	Mariano Rajoy	Philip VI
51º	Admiral General	Teodoro Esteban López Calderón	1 April 2017	27 January 2021	María Dolores de Cospedal	Mariano Rajoy	Philip VI
51º	Admiral General	Teodoro Esteban López Calderón	1 April 2017	27 January 2021	Margarita Robles	Pedro Sánchez	Philip VI
–	Admiral	Fausto Escrigas Rodríguez (acting)	27 January 2021	10 February 2021	Margarita Robles	Pedro Sánchez	Philip VI
52º	Admiral General	Antonio Martorell Lacave	10 February 2021	31 March 2023	Margarita Robles	Pedro Sánchez	Philip VI
–	Admiral	Carlos Martínez-Merello y Díaz de Miranda (acting)	31 March 2023	26 April 2023	Margarita Robles	Pedro Sánchez	Philip VI
53º	Admiral General	Antonio Piñeiro	25 April 2023	Incumbent	Margarita Robles	Pedro Sánchez	Philip VI

(*) Promoted posthumously to Admiral General in 1999. (**) Promoted to Admiral General ad honorem in 1999. (***) Promoted to Admiral General while in office.

== See also ==
- Chief of the Defence Staff
- Ministers of Defence
- Captain general of the Navy
- Spanish Navy
- Chief of Staff of the Army
- Chief of Staff of the Air and Space Force
