= Ismael Warleta y Ordovás =

Ismael Warleta y Ordovás (1836, Madrid – 9 August 1898) was a Spanish Navy officer who served as the Chief of Staff of the Navy from 20 August 1897 until his death on 9 August 1898 (although his successor was not appointed until 30 March 1899). Warleta's tenure as chief of naval staff coincided with the Spanish–American War, during which he attended a meeting on 23 April 1898 led by the naval minister Segismundo Bermejo y Merelo, where he supported the proposal of deploying Admiral Pascual Cervera y Topete's squadron to Cuba—a decision that led to the Battle of Santiago de Cuba. Previously, he had served as the head of the logistics branch of the Ministry of the Navy, and from 1888 until 1890 he commanded the cruiser Reina Regente as a ship-of-the-line captain.

Military offices
Preceded by Segismundo Bermejo y Merelo	Chief of Staff of the Navy; 1897–1898	Succeeded by Manuel Mozo y Díaz Robles
