= Admiral García =

Admiral García may refer to:

- Edmund Ernest García (1905–1971), U.S. Navy rear admiral
- Joxel García (born 1962), U.S. Public Health Service Commissioned Corps admiral
- Manuel Rebollo García (born 1945), Spanish Navy admiral
