= Fernando Martínez de Espinosa y Echeverri =

Fernando Martínez de Espinosa y Echeverri was a Spanish Navy officer who served as Chief of Staff of the Navy from 19 March 1896 until 22 October 1896. In the summer of 1895 Espinosa had commanded the Spanish squadron that represented their country at the opening of the Kiel Canal from the Infanta Maria Teresa. During the Spanish–American War, he was present at a meeting of senior Spanish naval officers chaired by Segismundo Bermejo y Merelo, the minister of the navy at the time, on 23 April 1898. Espinosa supported the idea of sending Admiral Pascual Cervera y Topete's squadron from Cape Verde to the Spanish colonies in the Caribbean (Cuba and Puerto Rico). This decision was adopted by the majority of the members which led to the Battle of Santiago de Cuba. Espinosa was made Commander of the Order of Charles III in 1882 and awarded the Grand Cross of the Royal and Military Order of Saint Hermenegild on 30 October 1889.

Military offices
Preceded by Zoilo Sánchez de Ocaña y Vieitiz	Chief of Staff of the Navy; 1896	Succeeded by Segismundo Bermejo y Merelo
