= Ordovás =

Ordovás is a surname. Notable people with the surname include:

- Ismael Warleta y Ordovás (1836–1898), Spanish Navy officer
- Jesús Ordovás (born 1947), Spanish journalist and radio broadcaster
- Manuel Ordovás (1912–1999), Spanish equestrian
- Pilar Ordovas, London-based art gallery owner
