= Manuel Mozo y Díaz Robles =

Spanish Navy officer

Manuel Mozo y Díaz Robles (1 January 1837 – 27 April 1902) was a Spanish Navy officer who served as the Chief of Staff of the Navy from 30 March 1899 until his death on 27 April 1902. Additionally, he commanded multiple different ships and squadrons, as well as serving as commandant of the Escuela Naval Militar. He himself entered the naval college at Cadíz in 1849. During the Spanish–American War, Mozo attended the 23 April 1898 meeting of senior Spanish naval officers chaired by Segismundo Bermejo y Merelo to discuss the dispatch of Admiral Pascual Cervera y Topete's squadron to Puerto Rico and Cuba. He stated that if the Government of Spain believed it was in the country's best interest, then he was in favor, otherwise he considered that it would lead to disaster unless his squadron was reinforced. He was awarded the Order of Naval Merit in 1897. As of 1895, he was a ship-of-the-line captain. He was a supporter of the Jeune Ecole French school of naval strategic thought, which he spoke of in his treatise on international maritime law.
