= Spanish Navy Headquarters =

Coordinates: 40.4179°N 3.6922°W

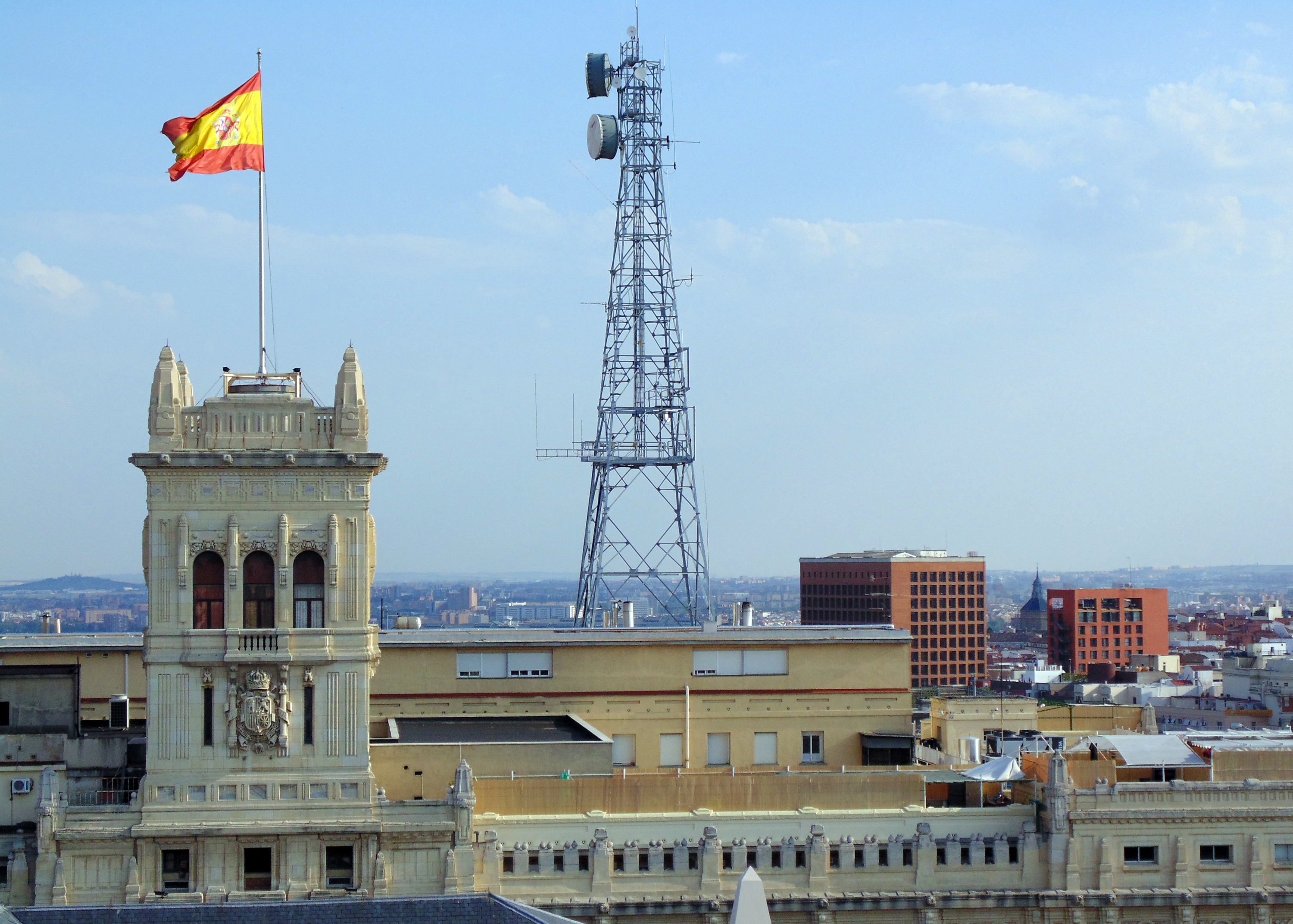
Photograph taken from a terrace in Madrid where the tower of the Navy Headquarters can be seen.

The Navy Headquarters (Cuartel General de la Armada) is a set of bodies that assist the Chief of Staff of the Navy in the exercise of command of the Spanish Navy. It is headquartered in Madrid.

== Building ==
The headquarters building is a neo-gothic building located on the Paseo del Prado in Madrid. In 1915, the Godoy Palace, headquarters of the Ministry of the Navy, was in a state of disrepair. Gabino Bugallal Araújo, the Minister of Finance, proposed to King Alfonso XIII the construction of a new headquarters. It was designed by the architects José Espelius and Francisco Javier de Luque. Its construction began in 1925, on land belonging to the Buen Retiro gardens, and it was inaugurated on July 16, 1928. It has a historicist-style main façade, and on its southeast corner, in a modern section of the building, the entrance to the Naval Museum, which occupies part of the building, is located on the ground floor.

== Structure ==
- General Staff of the Navy
- Information Systems and Telecommunications Department
- Head of Assistance and General Services
- Naval History and Culture Organ
- Office of the Chief of Staff of the Navy
- Legal Advisory Office of the Navy Headquarters
- Central Naval Security Section

== See also ==
- General Headquarters of the Air and Space Force
