= Spanish cruiser Reina Regente (1887) =

Spanish Navy protected cruiser of 1888–1895

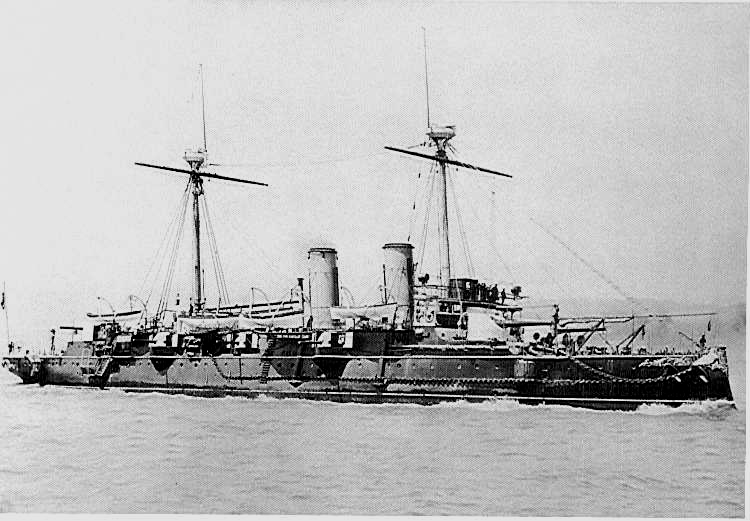
- Reina Regente around 1890.

History

Spain
- Name: Reina Regente
- Namesake: Maria Christina (1858–1929), Queen Regent of Spain (1885–1902)
- Builder: J&G Thomson, Clydebank, Scotland
- Cost: £243,000
- Yard number: 236
- Laid down: 20 June 1886
- Launched: 24 February 1887
- Commissioned: 1 January 1888
- Fate: Sank 10 March 1895

General characteristics
- Class & type: Reina Regente-class protected cruiser
- Displacement: 4,664 or 4,725 tons (see text)
- Length: 97.3 m (319 ft 3 in)
- Beam: 15.43 m (50 ft 7 in)
- Height: 8.92 m (29 ft 3 in)
- Draught: 5.90 m (19 ft 4 in)
- Installed power: 11,598 hp (8,649 kW) (nominal)
- Propulsion: Two Thompson horizontal triple expansion steam engines, two screws, 1,285 tons coal
- Speed: 20.5 knots (38.0 km/h; 23.6 mph)
- Range: 12,000 nmi (22,000 km; 14,000 mi)
- Complement: 420
- Armament: 4 × 240 mm (9.4 in)/35 Hontoria M1883 (single mounts); 6 × 120 mm (4.7 in)/35 Hontoria M1883 (single mounts); 6 × 57/42 Nordenfelt (single mounts); 2 x machine guns; 5 x torpedo tubes (2 bow, 2 athwartships, 1 aft)
- Armor: Hull: 3 to 5 in (76 to 127 mm); Main deck: 120–80 mm (4.7–3.1 in) amidships, 25 mm (1.0 in) fore and aft

Reina Regente (English: Queen Regent) was a Spanish Navy Reina Regente-class protected cruiser commissioned in 1888. She sank during a storm in the Gulf of Cádiz in 1895 with the loss of all hands.

Reina Regente was named for Queen Maria Christina, who served as Queen Regent of Spain from 1885 to 1902 during the minority of her son, the future King Alfonso XIII.

== Characteristics ==
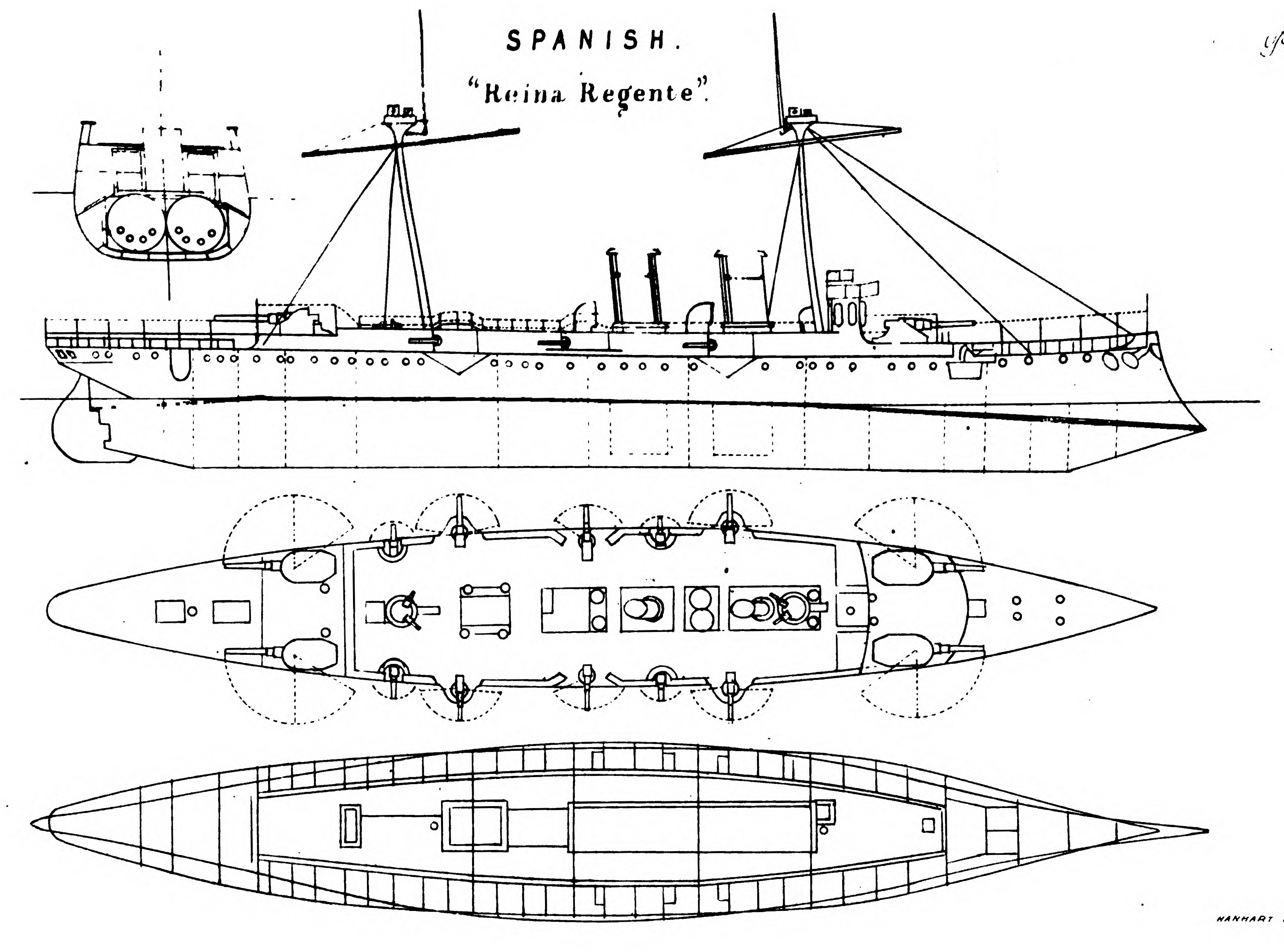
Line drawing of Reina Regente from Brassey's Naval Annual, 1887.

Reina Regente in 1895.

Reina Regente was the lead ship of the Reina Regente-class protected cruisers. She had an iron hull. She displaced either 4,664 or 4,725 tons, according to different sources. She was 97.30 metres (319 ft 3 in) long, 15.43 metres (50 ft 7 in) in beam, 8.92 metres (29 ft 3 in) in height, and 5.90 metres (19 ft 4 in) in draft. She had two Thompson horizontal triple expansion steam engines and four cylindrical boilers that produced a nominal 11,598 horsepower (8,649 kW), driving two screws. She reached 20.4 knots (37.8 km/h; 23.5 mph) under forced draft and on sea trials achieved 18.6 knots (34.4 km/h; 21.4 mph) under natural draft. She could carry up to 1,285 tons of coal and had a range of 12,000 nautical miles (22,000 km; 14,000 mi) at her economical cruising speed.

Reina Regente′s hull armor consisted of 3.5-inch (89 mm) thick Siemens steel plates along the upper part of her sides and 3-inch (76 mm) below, with 3.5 to 5 inches (89 to 127 mm) protecting her propulsion machinery and stores. Her deck armor ranged in thickness from 3.125 inches (79 mm) to 4.75 inches (121 mm) amidships and was 1 inch (25 mm) thick fore and aft. Her gun shields had 3 inches (76 mm) of armor.

Reina Regente′s armament consisted of four 240-millimetre (9.4 in)/35 Hontoria M1883 guns, six 120-millimetre (4.7 in)/35 Hontoria M1883 guns, six 57/42 Nordenfelt guns, two machine guns, and five torpedo tubes. The guns all were in single mounts; two of the 240-millimetre (9.4 in) guns were mounted forward and two aft, and the 120-millimetre (4.7 in) guns were in a central battery. Two torpedo tubes were mounted in her bow, two athwartships, and one aft.

== Construction and commissioning ==
The lead ship of her class, Reina Regente was laid down on 20 June 1886 at the shipyard of J&G Thomson in Clydebank, Scotland. She was launched on 24 February 1887 and commissioned on 1 January 1888 at Glasgow, Scotland, with a Spanish crew aboard.

== Service history ==
=== 1888–1895 ===
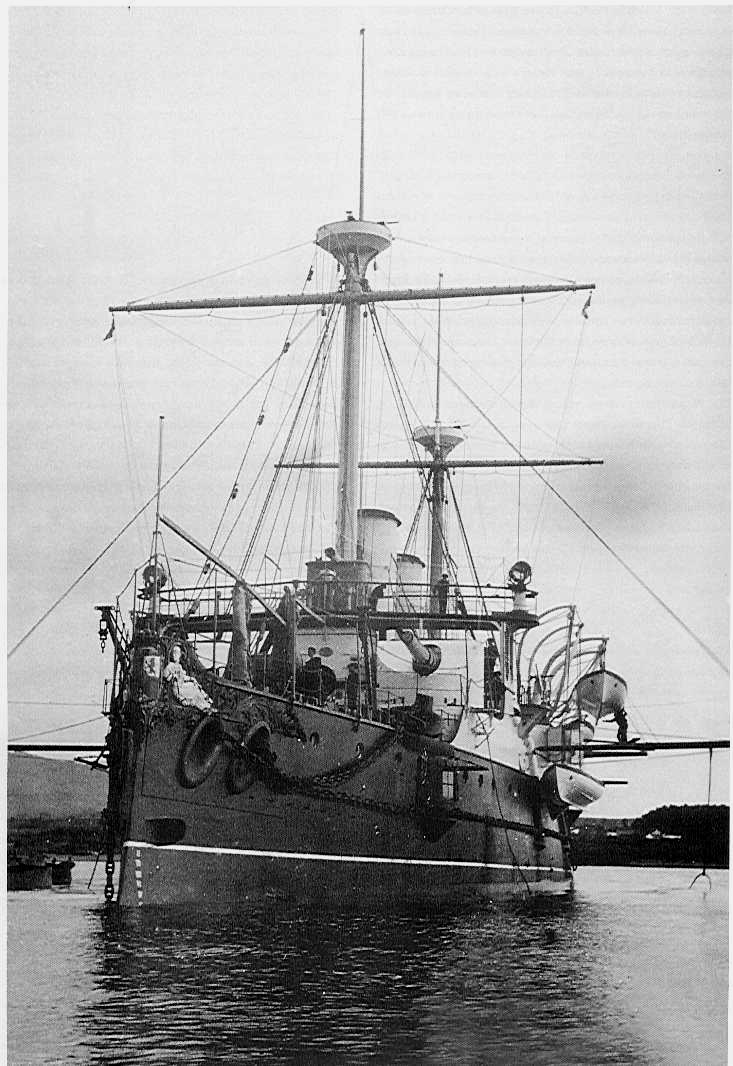
Reina Regente in 1889

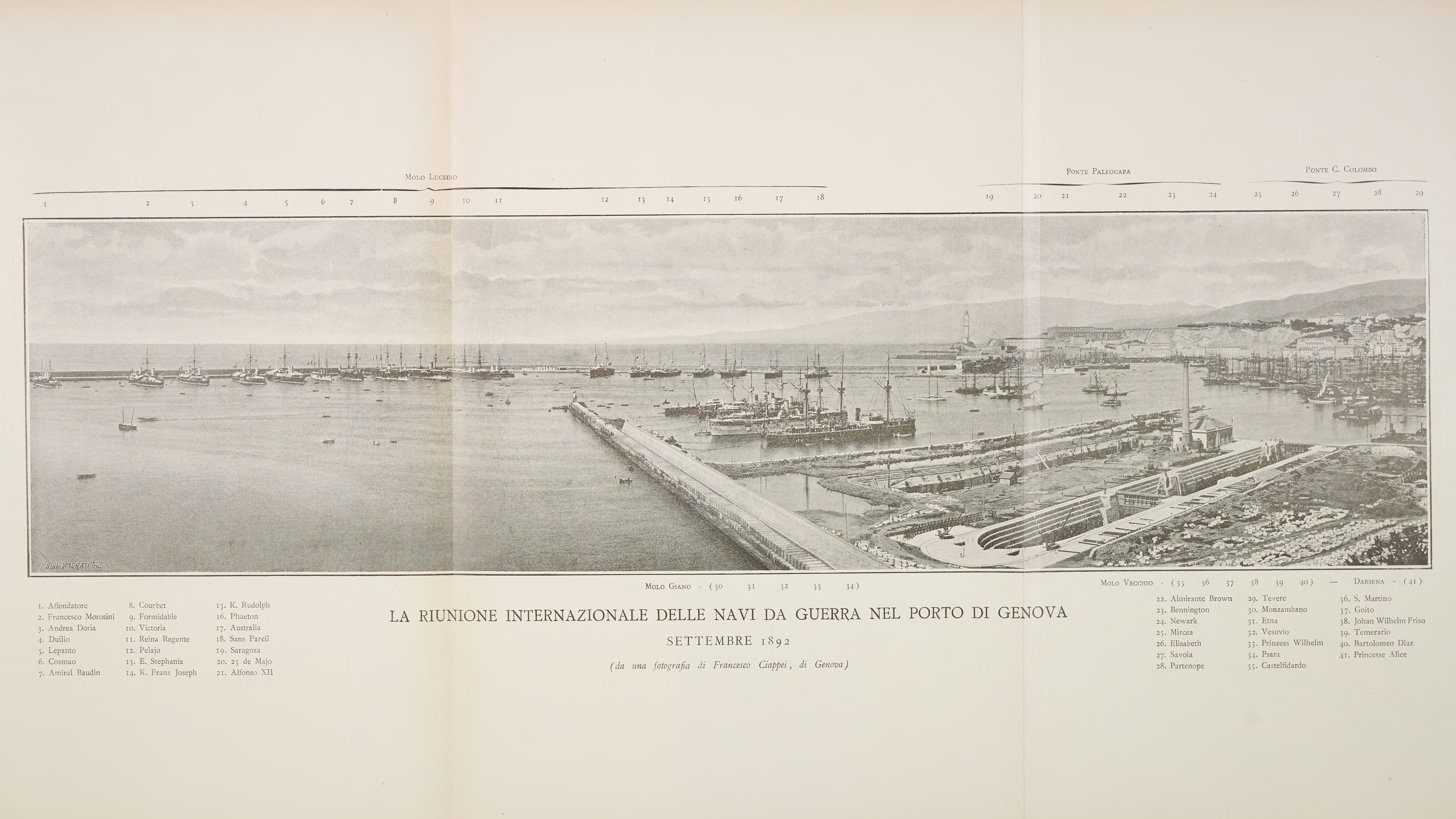
The international gathering of warships at Genoa, Italy, in 1892.

Reina Regente was one of the Spanish Navy ships present at Barcelona, Spain, for the opening of the 1888 Barcelona Universal Exposition on 20 May 1888. In a ceremony at Barcelona on 3 June 1888 with Queen Regent Maria Christina in attendance, she received a battle ensign the queen regent gave to her. Reina Regente was part of the Training Squadron, which also included the unprotected cruiser Reina Cristina and the protected cruiser Isla de Luzón, when Maria Christina visited the squadron on 11 August 1890. On 4 September 1892, the Training Squadron — by then under the command of Contraalmirante (Counter Admiral) Zoilo Sánchez de Ocaña y Vieitiz and made up of Reina Regente, the battleship Pelayo, the unprotected cruiser Alfonso XII, and the armoured frigate Vitoria — rendezvoused with the torpedo gunboat Temerario at Genoa, Italy, where the ships represented Spain at events celebrating the 400th anniversary of Christopher Columbus's discovery of the Americas. On 12 October 1892, Reina Regente was at Huelva, Spain, for more ceremonies honoring the discovery.

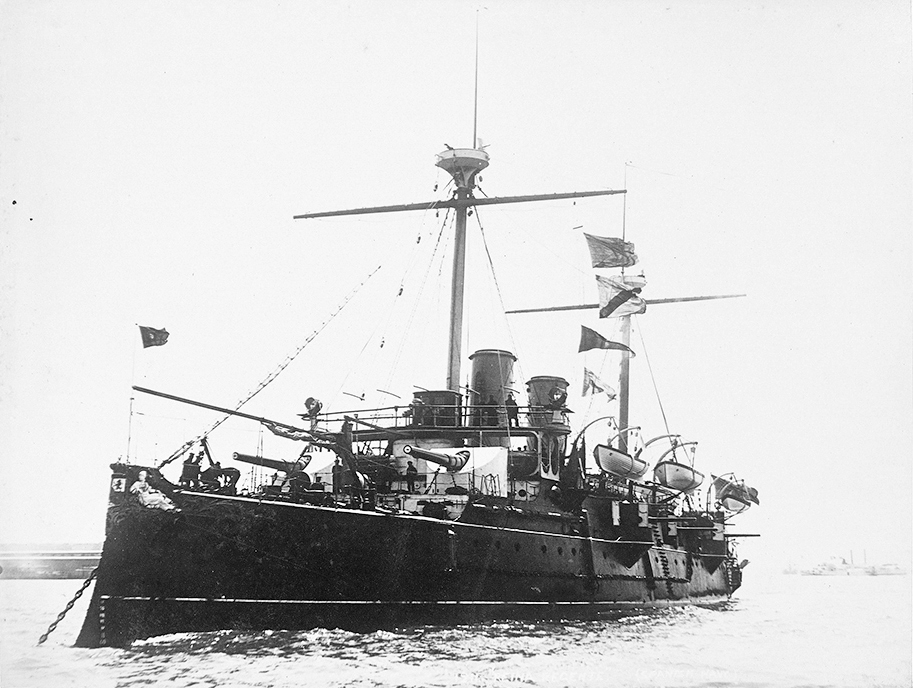
Reina Regente at New York City on 27 April 1893. (DeGolyer Library, Southern Methodist University)

In February 1893, replicas of Christopher Columbus's three ships, the caravels Niña and Pinta and the carrack Santa Maria, left Huelva bound for Havana in the Captaincy General of Cuba. They departed Havana on 15 April 1893 bound for the United States, with Reina Regente towing the replica of Santa María, the unprotected cruiser Infanta Isabel towing the replica of Pinta, and the gunboat Nueva España towing the replica of Niña. They arrived at dawn on 21 April at Hampton Roads, Virginia, where a U.S. Navy squadron and other foreign warships were waiting for them. Accompanied by the U.S. Navy squadron and the other foreign warships, they set out at dawn on 23 April for New York City, where they arrived that night and anchored in the Lower Bay of New York Harbor. They took part in the Columbian Naval Review on the Hudson River at New York on 27 April 1893. Infanta Isabel and Nueva España got underway from New York on 2 May 1893 bound for Havana, but Reina Regente remained behind at New York for drydock work.

In late August 1893, Reina Regente arrived at Cartagena, Spain, to take part in maneuvers with Pelayo, Alfonso XII, the protected cruiser Isla de Cuba, and the torpedo boats Barceló, Habana, and Rigel. The maneuvers involved simulated torpedo attacks off Santa Pola, Spain.

Still under Ocaña′s command, the Training Squadron got underway from Cartagena on 15 October 1893 and anchored at Santa Pola on 16 October for maneuvers simulating a battle off Alicante, Spain, between two formations of warships, one composed of Pelayo, Isla de Cuba, Barceló, Rigel, the unprotected cruiser Reina Mercedes, and the torpedo boat Rayo and the other of Reina Regente, Alfonso XII, Habana, the destroyer Destructor, and the torpedo boat Ariete, later joined by the unprotected cruiser Conde del Venadito. The maneuvers ended on 22 October 1893.

In 1895, Sultan Abdelaziz of Morocco sent an ambassador to Madrid to revise the Treaty of Fez, which had ended the First Melillan campaign, also known as the First Rif War, in 1894. A Spanish Army general named Fuentes, offended that a Muslim had set foot in Madrid, slapped the ambassador during the visit. Mortified, the Spanish government ordered Fuentes to apologize and gave the ambassador the use of Reina Regente for his return voyage to Spain. Reina Regente departed Cádiz, Spain, at 11:30 on 9 March 1895, transporting the ambassador and his entourage. She arrived at Tangier that night, and the Moroccans disembarked.

=== Loss ===
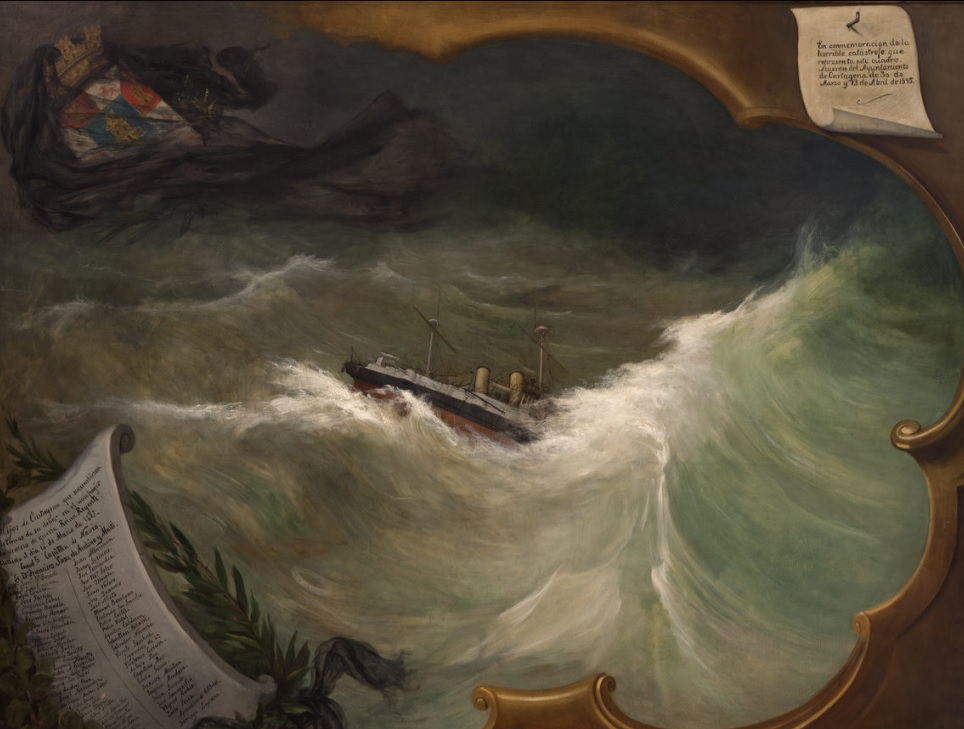
Reina Regente sinks with the loss of all hands during a storm on 10 March 1895 in an oil painting by Manuel Ussel de Guimbarda (1833–1907). Many of her crew lived in Cartagena, Spain, and the coat of arms of Cartagena covered by a mourning veil is in the upper left corner to signify the pain the city experienced in the disaster.

Reina Regente′s commanding officer, Capitán de navío (Ship-of-the-Line Captain) Francisco Sanz de Andino, was eager to return to Cádiz so that he could witness the launching of the modern armored cruiser Emperador Carlos V. At 10:00 on 10 March 1895, Reina Regente departed Tangier bound for Cádiz with a crew of 412 on board, leaving behind two crewmen who had not arrived in time for her departure. She disappeared over the horizon shortly after 12:00.

As Reina Regente passed through the Strait of Gibraltar into the Gulf of Cádiz a severe storm struck the area. At around 12:30, the merchant ships Matheus and Mayfield, struggling against hurricane-force winds and huge waves, sighted Reina Regente when she was about 12 nautical miles (22 km; 14 mi) northwest of Cape Spartel, and some people at Tarifa, Spain, also sighted her. Reina Regente never arrived at Cádiz, and was declared overdue on 13 March 1895.

Amid hopes that Reina Regente had survived the storm and perhaps taken shelter in an African port or the Canary Islands, Isla de Luzón, the protected cruiser Alfonso XIII, other warships, and merchant ships put to sea from Spain, Gibraltar, and Morocco to conduct a massive search. The search focused on her route from Tangier to Cádiz, especially in the vicinity of Cape Trafalgar, but did not find her, although a British ship found a Newfoundland dog which had belonged to an alférez de navío (ensign) aboard Reina Regente which had survived by jumping onto a grating. (The British ship's crew rescued the dog and kept it aboard as a pet; when the ship later visited Sanlúcar de Barrameda, the dog recognized the coastline, jumped overboard, swam to shore, and ran to the home of its late owner's parents.) Otherwise the search effort found no sign of Reina Regente or her crew. Wreckage washed up on several nearby beaches in Tarifa and Algeciras in the following days, including pieces of wood, oars, lifebuoys, a compass box, a piece of a flag sheath bearing the name "Reina Regente," and a metope bearing the letter "R". The two men left behind in Tangier were the ship's only human survivors.

Press reporting of 19 March 1895 indicated that Alfonso XIII had discovered a wreck with only 20 inches (51 cm) of its masts protruding from the water near Bajo Acientos, not far from the Strait of Gibraltar, and had returned with divers to recover bodies from it. A newspaper article of 2 April 1895 reported that the wreck Alfonso XIII found probably was that of a merchant ship, and that the Spanish Minister of the Navy held out hope that Reina Regente remained afloat. On 26 April 1895 the press reported that Isla de Luzón had discovered Reina Regente′s wreck in 654 feet (199 m) of water midway between Tarifa and Cape Trafalgar, but this also did not turn out to be Reina Regente. The location of Reina Regente′s wreck, presumably in the Gulf of Cádiz, is unknown, although its whereabouts have been the subject of academic and scientific inquiry. Her loss remains one of the deadliest shipwrecks in the history of the Spanish Navy.

The exact cause of the loss of Reina Regente is unknown, although several hypotheses arose in its aftermath. All five of her commanding officers during her service life reported that she was top-heavy and recommended either the replacement of her 240-millimetre (9.4 in) guns with 200-millimetre (7.9 in) guns to reduce weight or an increase in the capacity of her coal bunkers to improve her stability and seaworthiness. The Ministry of the Navy took no action on these recommendations, and the most widely held hypothesis was that her top-heaviness was at least a contributing factor in her loss, perhaps causing her to capsize and sink during the 1895 storm. With this in mind, her sister ships Alfonso XIII and Lepanto were armed with 200-millimetre (7.9 in) guns.
