= Ramón Auñón y Villalón =

Minister of Spanish Navy during Spanish–American War

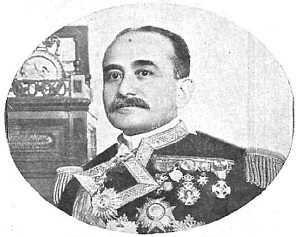
A 1901 photograph of Auńón

Ramón Auńón y Villalón (25 August 1844 – 20 May 1925) was a Spanish Navy officer and politician who served as Minister of the Navy during the Spanish–American War, replacing Segismundo Bermejo y Merelo. He had joined the Spanish Navy at the age of 15 and fought in the Hispano–Moroccan War and Cuba, later commanding a battleship and gaining a reputation for being an efficient administrator. Upon becoming Minister of the Navy, Auńon was forced to make a decision of whether or not Pascual Cervera y Topete's squadron in Santiago de Cuba should attack the United States Navy or not. He ultimately decided in favor of attacking, resulting in the disastrous Battle of Santiago de Cuba. Afterwards, he would serve as a member of the Congress of Deputies and as civil governor of the Province of Barcelona.

== Sources ==
=== Books ===
- Tucker, Spencer (2009). The Encyclopedia of the Spanish-American and Philippine-American Wars: A Political, Social, and Military History. ABC-CLIO. ISBN 978-1851099511.

Political offices
Preceded by Segismundo Bermejo y Merelo	Minister of the Navy; 1898–1899	Succeeded by Jose Gómez-Imaz Simón
