= Reina Regente-class cruiser =

Spanish navy cruiser class

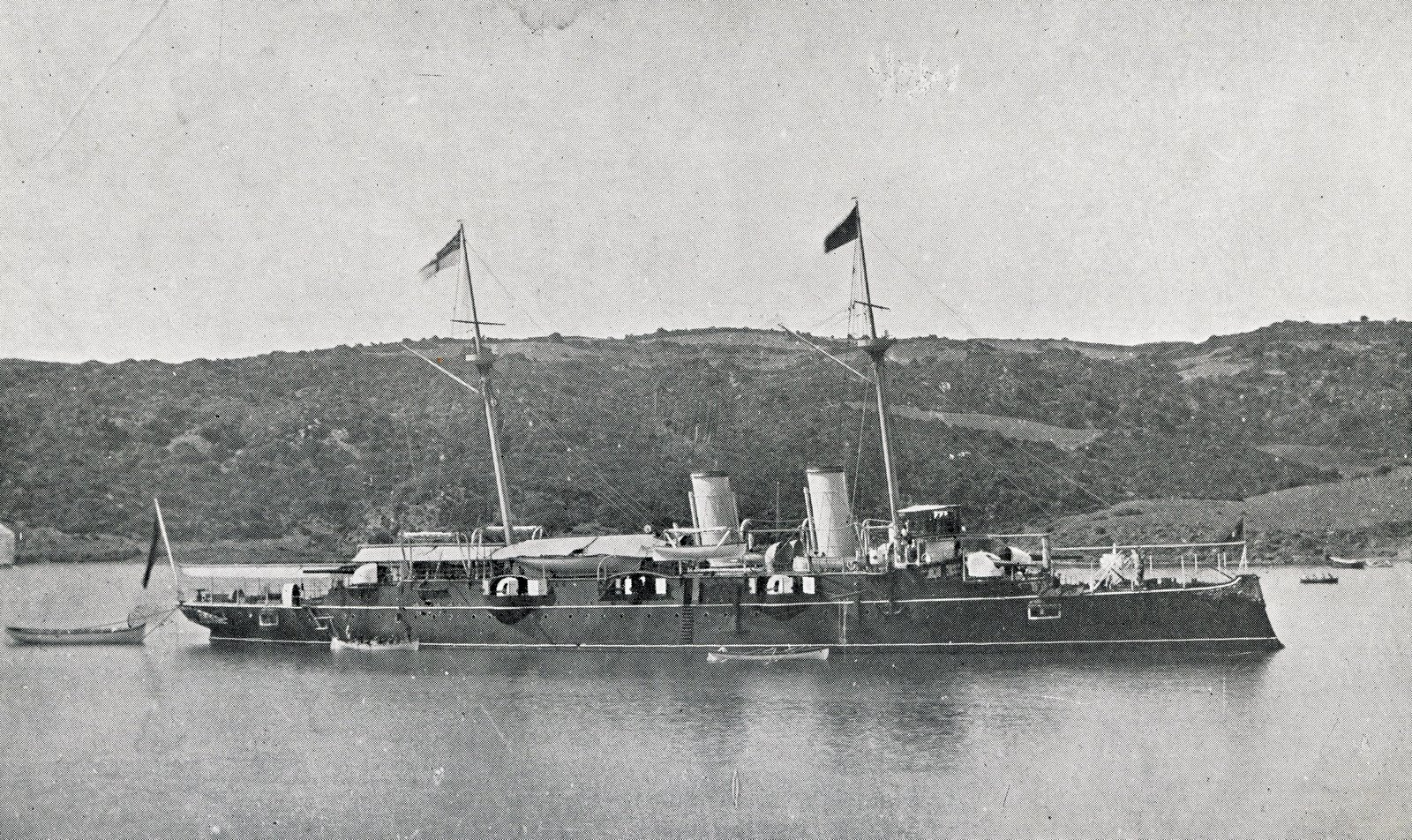
- Alfonso XIII

Class overview
- Name: Reina Regente class
- Operators: Spanish Navy
- Succeeded by: Rio de la Plata
- Built: 1886–1900
- Completed: 3
- Lost: 1
- Retired: 2

General characteristics
- Type: Protected cruiser
- Displacement: 4,725 tons
- Length: 96.62 m (317 ft 0 in)
- Beam: 15.24 m (50 ft 0 in)
- Draught: 6.21 m (20 ft 4 in)
- Propulsion: 11,500 hp (8,600 kW), two shafts
- Speed: 20.4 knots (37.8 km/h)
- Complement: 440
- Armament: 4× 20 cm (7.9 in) (4 × 1); 6 × 12 cm (4.7 in) (6 × 1); 6 × 5.7 cm (2.2 in) (6 × 1); 5 × torpedo tubes
- Armour: 3 in (7.6 cm) turret; 3.13 in (8.0 cm) deck

The Reina Regente class was a class of protected cruisers of the Spanish Navy. The class comprised Reina Regente, Alfonso XIII and Lepanto.

== Design ==
The ships of the class were 96.62 metres (317 ft 0 in) long, had a beam of 15.24 metres (50 ft 0 in), a draught of 6.21 metres (20 ft 4 in), and had a displacement of 4,725 ton. The ships were equipped with 2 shaft reciprocating engines, which were rated at 11,500 ihp (8,600 kW) and produced a top speed of 20.4 knots (37.8 km/h).

The ships had deck armour of 3.13 in (8.0 cm), turret armour of 3 in (7.6 cm) and a complement 440 men. The main armament of the ships were four 20 cm (7.9 in) single turret guns. Secondary armament included six single 12 cm (4.7 in) guns and six 5.7 cm (2.2 in) single guns.

== Construction ==
| Name | Laid down | Launched | Commissioned | Decommissioned | Shipyard |
|---|---|---|---|---|---|
| Reina Regente | 20 June 1886 | 24 February 1887 | 1 January 1888 | Sank during a storm 10 March 1895 | J&G Thomson |
| Alfonso XIII | 1891 | 31 August 1891 | 18 May 1900 | scrapped 1907 | Ferrol |
| Lepanto | 1 October 1886 | 16 November 1893 | 26 January 1899 | 3 October 1908 | Arsenal de la Cartagena |
