= Zoilo Sánchez de Ocaña y Vieitiz =

Zoilo Sánchez de Ocańa y Vieitiz (27 June 1831 – 1907) was a Spanish Navy officer who served as the first Chief of Staff of the Navy from 14 July 1895 to 19 March 1896. As of 1869, he was a frigate captain on the war and navy section of the State Council. He was also made a Commander of the Order of Charles III in 1865, and in 1893 he had been awarded the Order of Naval Merit. It is likely that he was retired or died by the time the Spanish–American War broke out in 1898, as he was not present at a meeting of senior Spanish naval officers on 23 April 1898 that decided to send Admiral Pascual Cervera's squadron to Cuba.

Military offices
Preceded by Post created	Chief of Staff of the Navy; 1895–1896	Succeeded by Fernando Martínez de Espinosa
