= Spanish cruiser Alfonso XIII =

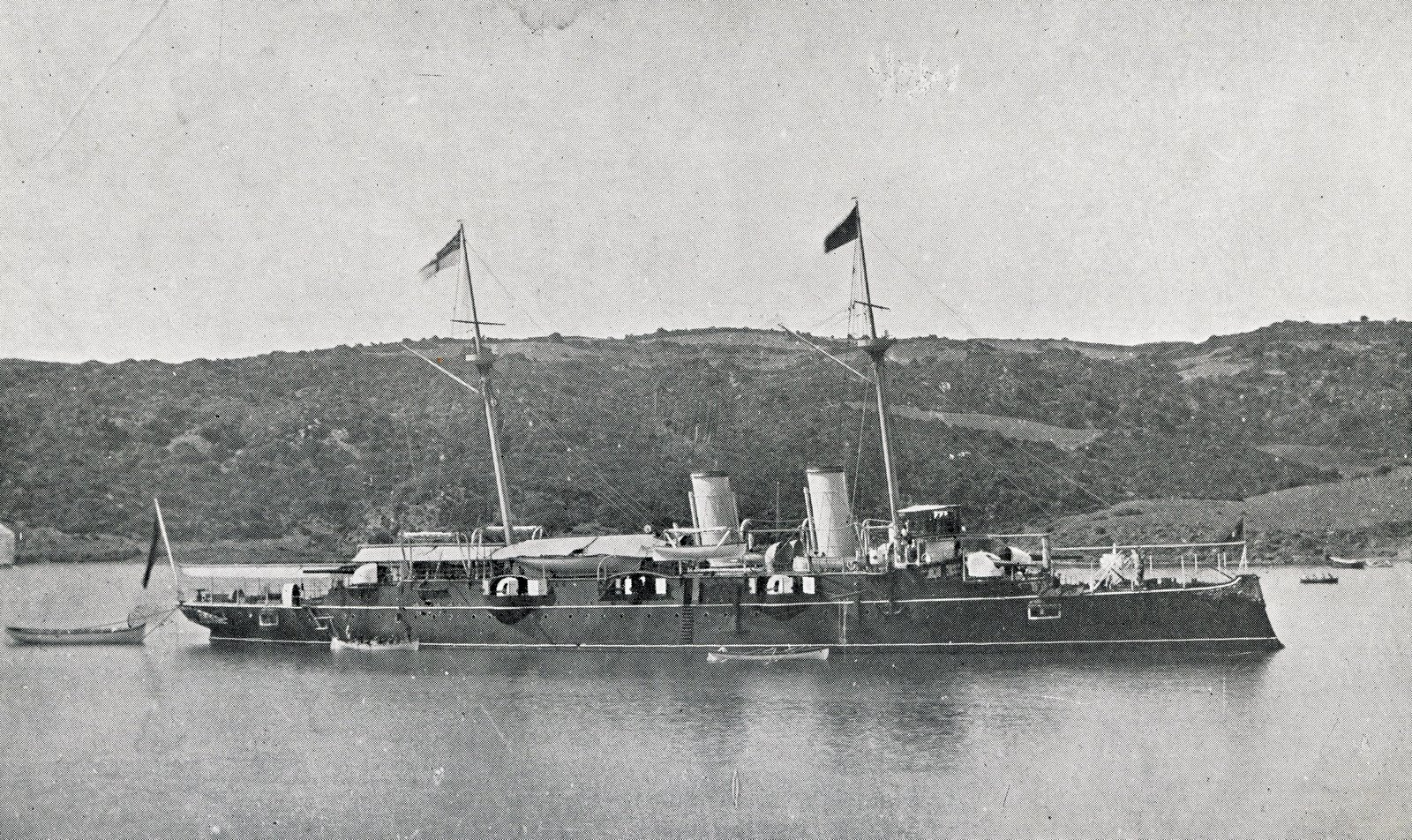

History

Spain
- Name: Alfonso XIII
- Namesake: King Alfonso XIII of Spain
- Builder: Naval shipyard at Ferrol, Spain
- Cost: 9,000,000 pesetas
- Laid down: 1891 (Note: The Spanish–American War Centennial Website: Alfonso XIII claims she was laid down sometime in 1891.)
- Launched: 31 August 1891
- Completed: nominally (as training ship) 1896; fully completed 18 May 1900
- Commissioned: 18 May 1900
- Fate: Scrapped in early 1900s

General characteristics
- Class & type: Reina Regente-class protected cruiser
- Displacement: 4,725 tons
- Length: 317 ft 0 in (96.62 m)
- Beam: 50 ft 0 in (15.24 m)
- Draft: 20 ft 4 in (6.20 m) mean
- Installed power: Rated at 11,500 ihp (8,600 kW) (forced draft); actual power much less
- Propulsion: 2-shaft, horizontal triple expansion
- Speed: Rated: 20.4 knots (37.8 km/h; 23.5 mph) (forced draft); Actual: 14 knots (26 km/h; 16 mph)
- Endurance: Coal 1,200 to 1,285 tons (normal)
- Complement: 440 officers and enlisted
- Armament: 4 × 7.9 in (201 mm) guns; 6 × 4.7-inch (119 mm) guns; 6 × 6 pounder quick-firing guns; 6 × Nordenfeld machine guns; 5 × torpedo tubes
- Armor: Gun shields 3 in (7.6 cm); Deck 4.75–3.125 in (12.07–7.94 cm) amidships; 1 in (2.5 cm) fore and aft

Profile of Alfonso XIII with its appearance in 1896

Alfonso XIII was a Reina Regente-class first-class protected cruiser of the Spanish Navy which served in the Spanish fleet from 1896 until the early years of the 20th century.

== Technical characteristics ==
Alfonso XIII was built at the naval shipyard at Ferrol in Spain. Laid down in 1891, she was launched on 31 August 1891. In 1896, she entered service in a partially completed state as a training ship. She was finally fully completed and commissioned on 18 May 1900.

The ships class ships were intended to have heavy armament and high speed on a small displacement. The lead ship, Reina Regente, although otherwise considered excellent, had proven top-heavy, so changes were made to Alfonso XIII to address this, including a smaller main gun. However, the changes, intended to improve upon Reina Regente, instead left Alfonso XIII lightly armed, slow, and still unstable in heavy seas.

The Hontoria-built 7.9-inch (201 mm) guns were in single mounts on the broadside fore and aft, while the 4.7-inch (119 mm) guns were in a central battery amidships. All five torpedo tubes were fixed and above the waterline, with two forward, one on each broadside, and one aft.

== Operational history ==
Alfonso XIII was not fully complete when she entered service as a training ship in 1896. Still incomplete at the time of the Spanish–American War, she was sent to Cádiz on 7 May 1898 to join the Spanish Navy's 2nd Squadron, under the command of Rear Admiral Manuel de Camara, then forming for a voyage to the Philippines. Due to her incomplete condition, Camara left her behind at Cádiz when his Squadron departed on 16 June 1898 on its abortive voyage. Alfonso XIII spent the rest of the war in Spanish waters to defend Spain's coast from a potential attack by the United States Navy.

After the war, Alfonso XIII finally was completed on 18 May 1900, and she was commissioned the same day. Her shortcomings in seaworthiness led her to a short career, and she was soon stricken and scrapped.
