= Felipe José Abárzuza =

Spanish admiral (1896–1970)

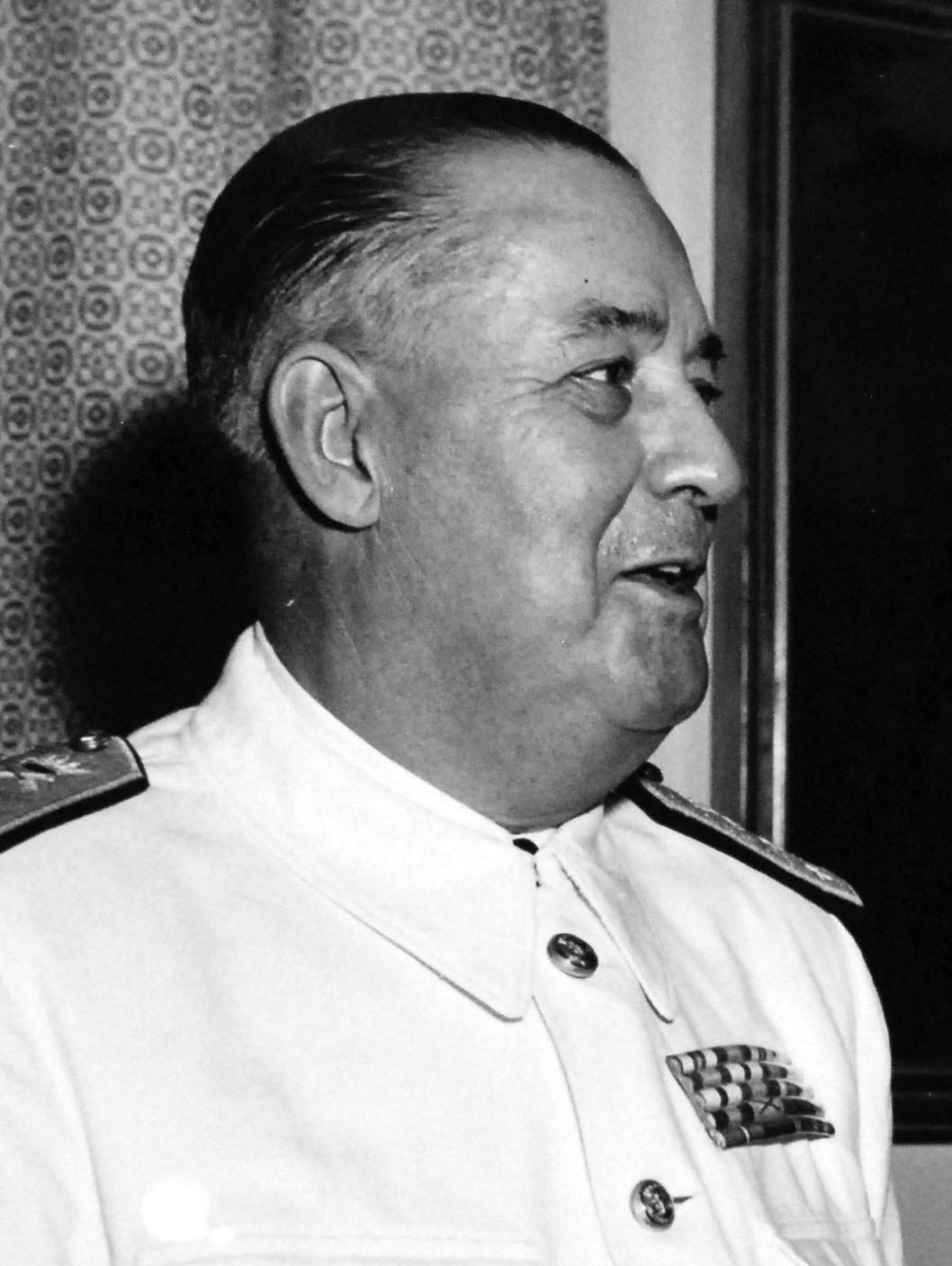

Minister of the Navy of Spain
- In office 25 February 1957 – 11 July 1962
- Prime Minister: Francisco Franco
- Preceded by: Salvador Moreno Fernández
- Succeeded by: Pedro Nieto Antúnez

Personal details
- Born: Felipe José Abárzuza y Oliva; 24 May 1896 Cádiz, Kingdom of Spain
- Died: 27 August 1970 (aged 74) Los Molinos, Spanish State
- Party: Traditionalist Spanish Phalanx of the Councils of the National Syndicalist Offensive

Military service
- Branch/service: Spanish Armed Forces
- Rank: Admiral

Felipe José Abárzuza y Oliva (24 May 1896 – 27 August 1970) was a Spanish admiral who served as Minister of the Navy of Spain between 1957 and 1962, during the Francoist dictatorship.

== Early life and education ==
Born on 24 May 1896 in Cádiz, Abárzuza entered the Escuela Naval Militar in 1913.

== Career ==
On 5 January 1929, Abárzuza was appointed commander of the submarine C-3, a position he held until 9 May 1931. During his command, he received decorations for his actions in wartime.

In 1945, Abárzuza was promoted to rear admiral, and in 1957 he attained the rank of vice admiral.

He served as Chief of Staff of the Squadron during the Spanish Civil War. He later held the positions of Chief of Instruction and Admiral Director at the Spanish Ministry of the Navy. From December 1954 to December 1955, he was Commander General of the Fleet. He served as Chief of Staff of the Navy from 1956 to 1957 and as Navy Minister from 1957 to 1962.

== Late life ==
As the Navy Minister, he represented the Spanish state at the wedding of Juan Carlos de Borbón and Sofía de Grecia, which took place in Athens on 14 May 1962.

Abárzuza died on 27 August 1970 in Los Molinos, at the age of 74.

== Decorations ==
This list is incomplete. You can help by expanding it.

- Grand Cross of the Order of Carlos III
- Grand Cross of the Order of Isabella the Catholic (1962)
