= Pascual Pery =

Spanish admiral

Minister of the Navy of Spain
- In office 15 April 1977 – 5 July 1977
- Prime Minister: Adolfo Suárez
- Preceded by: Gabriel Pita da Veiga
- Succeeded by: Manuel Gutiérrez Mellado (Defence)

Personal details
- Born: Pascual Pery Junquera; 17 October 1911 Ferrol, Galicia, Kingdom of Spain
- Died: 20 June 1989 (aged 77) Madrid, Spain

Military service
- Branch/service: Spanish Armed Forces
- Years of service: 1927–1989

Pascual Pery Junquera (17 October 1911 – 20 June 1989) was a Spanish admiral who served as Minister of the Navy of Spain in 1977, during the Spanish transition to democracy.
