= Adolfo Baturone Colombo =

Spanish admiral

Minister of the Navy of Spain
- In office 30 October 1969 – 9 June 1973
- Prime Minister: Francisco Franco
- Preceded by: Pedro Nieto Antúnez
- Succeeded by: Gabriel Pita da Veiga

Personal details
- Born: Adolfo Baturone Colombo; 24 February 1904 Cádiz, Kingdom of Spain
- Died: 9 November 1999 (aged 95) Cádiz, Spain

Military service
- Branch/service: Spanish Armed Forces
- Years of service: 1920–1999

Adolfo Baturone Colombo (24 February 1904 – 9 November 1999) was a Spanish admiral who served as Minister of the Navy of Spain between 1969 and 1973, during the Francoist dictatorship.
