= Joaquín de Frías y Moya =

Spanish military figure and politician (1784–1851)

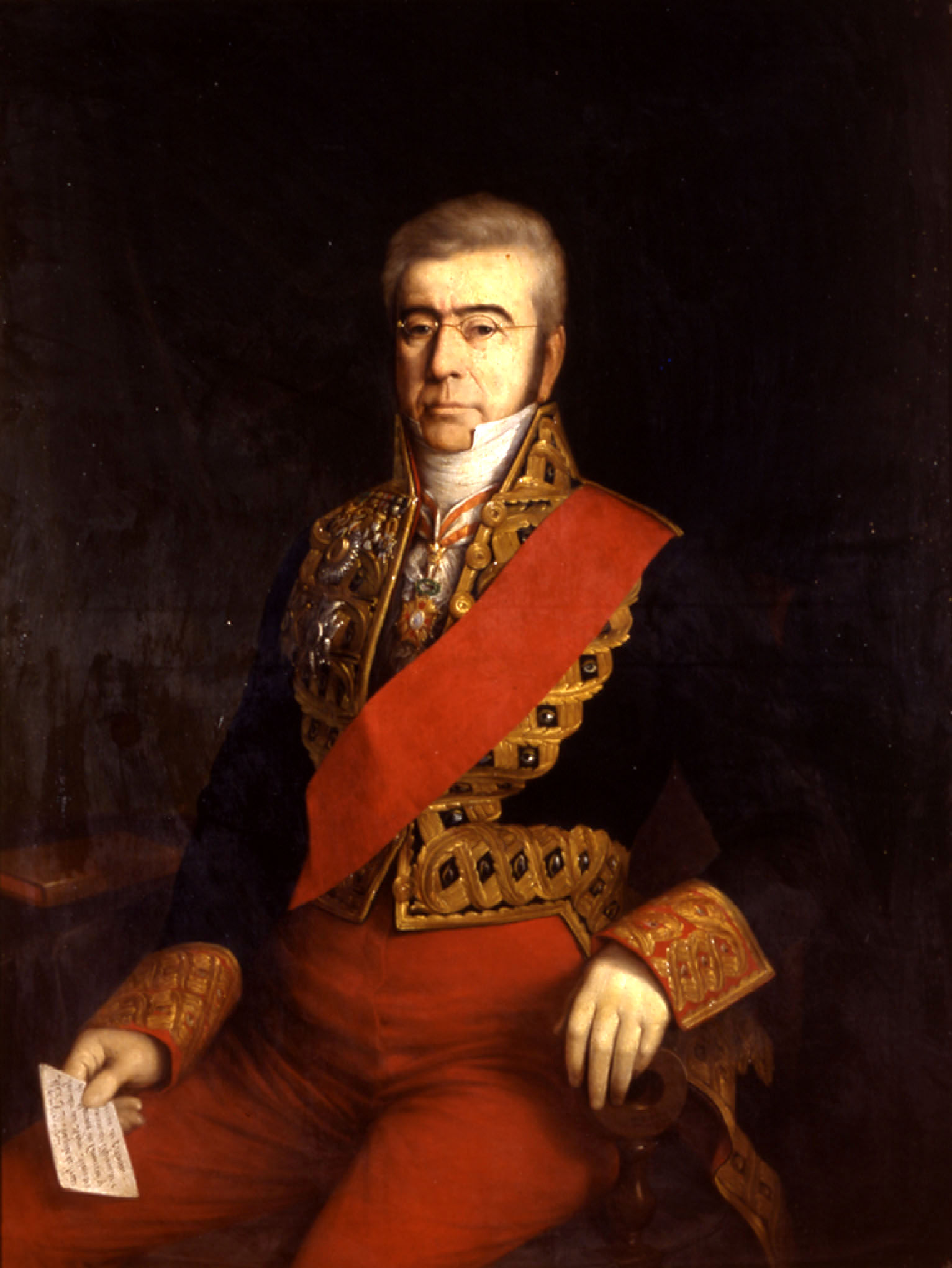
Joaquín de Frías

Joaquín de Frías y Moya (1784 in Cádiz, Spain – 1851 in Madrid, Spain) was a Spanish military figure and politician who served as Minister of State and of Marine in 1843.

Political offices
Preceded by Olegario de los Cuetos; Acting	Minister of State; 30 July 1843 – 20 November 1843	Succeeded by Salustiano de Olózaga
