= Pedro Nieto Antúnez =

Spanish admiral (1898–1978)

Minister of the Navy of Spain
- In office 11 July 1962 – 30 October 1969
- Prime Minister: Francisco Franco
- Preceded by: Felipe José Abárzuza
- Succeeded by: Adolfo Baturone Colombo

Minister of the Army of Spain
- Acting
- In office 11 February 1964 – 21 February 1964
- Prime Minister: Francisco Franco
- Preceded by: Pablo Martín Alonso
- Succeeded by: Camilo Menéndez Tolosa

Personal details
- Born: Pedro Nieto Antúnez; 18 August 1898 Ferrol, Galicia, Kingdom of Spain
- Died: 6 December 1978 (aged 80) Madrid, Spain

Military service
- Branch/service: Spanish Armed Forces
- Years of service: 1913–1978

Pedro Nieto Antúnez (18 August 1898 – 6 December 1978) was a Spanish admiral who served as Minister of the Navy of Spain between 1962 and 1969, as well as acting Minister of the Army in February 1964, during the Francoist dictatorship.
