= Manuel Rebollo García =

Spanish Navy officer (born 1945)

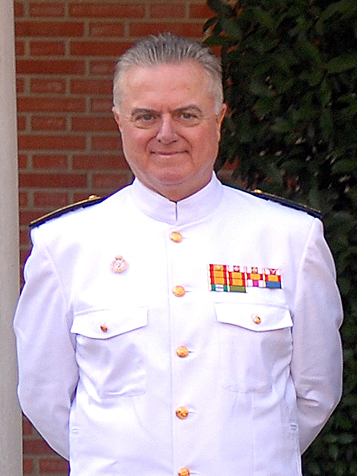
- Manuel Rebollo in 2008
- Born: Manuel Rebollo García; July 2, 1945 (age 81); Pilar de la Horadada, Spain
- Military career
- Allegiance: Spain
- Branch: Spanish Navy
- Service years: 1963–2012
- Rank: General Admiral
- Commands: Tabarca; Contramaestre Casado; Santa María; Juan Sebastián de Elcano

Manuel Rebollo García (born 2 July 1945) is a Spanish Navy officer. He became Chief of the Naval Staff on 18 July 2008. Admiral Jaime Muñoz-Delgado replaced him on 27 July de 2012.

Military offices
Preceded by Sebastián Zaragoza Soto	Chief of the Naval Staff; 18 July 2008 – 27 July 2012	Succeeded by Jaime Muñoz-Delgado
