= Segismundo Bermejo y Merelo =

Admiral in the Spanish Navy (1832 –1899)

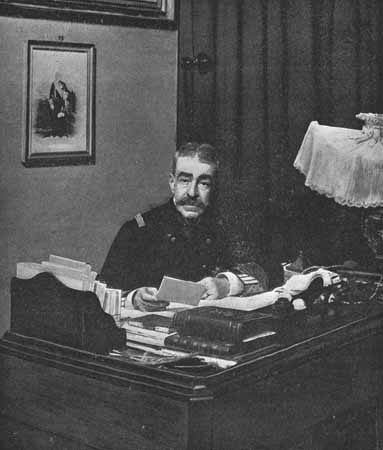

Minister of the Navy of Spain
- In office 4 October 1897 – 18 May 1898
- Monarch: Alfonso XIII of Spain
- Regent: Maria Christina of Austria
- Prime Minister: Práxedes Mateo Sagasta
- Preceded by: José María Beránger
- Succeeded by: Ramón Auñón y Villalón

Chief of Staff of the Navy of Spain
- In office 22 October 1896 – 1 April 1897
- Monarch: Alfonso XIII
- Regent: Maria Christina of Austria
- Prime Minister: Antonio Cánovas del Castillo
- Minister of the Navy: José María Beránger
- Preceded by: Fernando Martínez de Espinosa
- Succeeded by: Ismael Warleta Ordovás

Personal details
- Born: March 9, 1832 San Fernando, Spain
- Died: December 2, 1899 (aged 66) Madrid, Spain

Military service
- Allegiance: Spain
- Branch/service: Spanish Navy
- Years of service: 1846–1898
- Rank: Almirante (Admiral)
- Commands: Ministry of the Navy; Naval staff Home squadron Torpedo School
- Battles/wars: Spanish–American War

Segismundo Bermejo y Merelo (9 March 1832 – 2 December 1899) was a Spanish Navy officer who served as chief of Staff of the Navy and Minister of the Navy during the Spanish–American War. He was most notable for his role in dispatching Pascual Cervera y Topete, in command of a squadron of four cruisers and three destroyers, to Cuba in May 1898. It set up the conditions for the Battle of Santiago de Cuba. Bermejo himself was forced to resign as Minister of the Navy after the defeat of the Spanish Pacific Squadron at the Battle of Manila Bay by the United States Navy, and died a year later.

== Early life and service ==
Born on 9 March 1832 in San Fernando, Cádiz, he joined the Spanish Navy in 1846, when he was just fourteen years old. Bermejo went on to serve in both Cuba and the Philippines. He later served as a professor at the Escuela Naval Militar, heading the torpedo school, being responsible for creating the first division of torpedo boats (later renamed destroyers) in the Spanish Armada. He later served as Chief of Staff of the Navy from 22 October 1896 to 1 April 1897 and commanded the home squadron at Cádiz before becoming minister of the navy in 1897. That year he also attended the Diamond Jubilee of Queen Victoria in the United Kingdom as one of Spain's representatives, celebrating her 60th anniversary on the throne.

== War with the United States ==
When tensions between the United States and the Kingdom of Spain escalated during the spring of 1898, Admiral Bermejo was confident that the Spanish Navy was capable enough to defeat the U.S. Navy. For Spain's war strategy, Bermejo proposed a blockade of the American East Coast and an attack on Key West, Florida. Rear Admiral Pascual Cervera y Topete, a friend of his, pointed out the absurdity of such a plan, stating the Spain did not have the ability carry it out and that the American fleet was much more formidable than theirs. Bermejo continued to remain optimistic nonetheless, and on April 23, he led a meeting of Spanish naval officers to discuss the situation. Ultimately, they accepted the proposal of sending Admiral Cervera to Cuba and Puerto Rico (he was at the time awaiting their decision at Cape Verde). Bermejo's plan was adopted by the government and the only modification was allowing Cervera—who was appointed to lead the fleet—to choose his specific destination in the region.

By early May, when the Pacific Squadron under Rear Admiral Patricio Montojo was defeated at the Battle of Manila Bay (May 1), Bermejo modified the order and gave Cervera permission to return to Spain (who by then had reached the Caribbean Sea). However, at that point Cervera's squadron did not have enough coal to make the return trip, and Bermejo's replacement as naval minister later countermanded that order, telling the rear admiral to remain at the harbor of Santiago de Cuba. Popular opinion turned against Admiral Bermejo due to the defeat of the Spanish squadron at Manila Bay, and he was forced to resign.

Bermejo died in Madrid in 1899.

== Personal life ==
He had written literary works and was an author of science fiction.

== Sources ==
- Keenan, Jerry (2001). Encyclopedia of the Spanish-American and Philippine-American Wars. ABC-CLIO. ISBN 157607093X.
- Tucker, Spencer (2009). The Encyclopedia of the Spanish-American and Philippine-American Wars: A Political, Social, and Military History. ABC-CLIO. ISBN 978-1851099511.

Military offices
Preceded by Fernando Martínez de Espinosa	Chief of Staff of the Navy; 1896–1897	Succeeded by Ismael Warleta Ordovás
Political offices
Preceded by José María Beránger	Minister of the Navy; 1897–1898	Succeeded by Ramón Auñón y Villalón
