= Ministry of the Navy (Spain) =

Former government department of Spain (1851–1977)

- Spanish: Ministerio de Marina
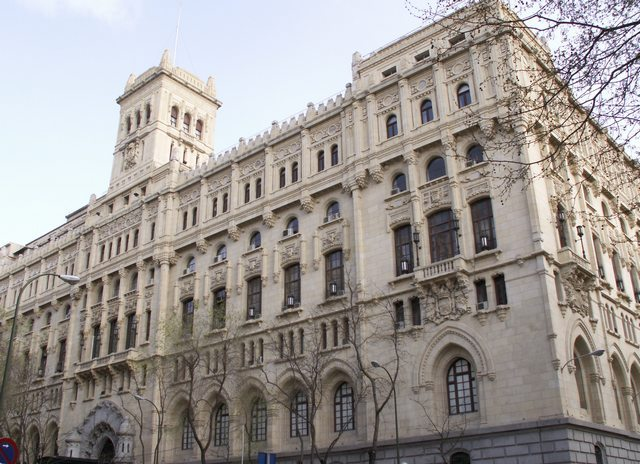
- General Headquarters of the Navy, formerly the site of the naval ministry

Agency overview
- Formed: 20 September 1851; 175 years ago
- Preceding agency: Office of the Navy of Spain
- Dissolved: 4 July 1977; 49 years ago
- Superseding agency: Ministry of Defence
- Jurisdiction: Spanish Navy
- Headquarters: General Headquarters of the Navy
- Ministers responsible: Captain general of the Navy Francisco Armero Peñaranda, first Minister; Admiral Pascual Pery, last Minister

Ministry of the Navy (Spanish: Ministerio de Marina) was a government department of Spain that was tasked with oversight of the Spanish Navy (Armada Española) and existed in multiple reincarnations before being finally dissolved in 1977, when its functions were merged with the Ministry of Defence by Adolfo Suárez.

The Office of the Navy of Spain (Despacho de Marina de España) was reorganized into the Ministry of the Navy by the Royal Decree from 20 September 1851. It was dissolved twice in its history before being restored by Francisco Franco in 1939, lasting until being merged with the Defence Ministry in 1977 by the Royal Decree 1558/1977, as part of the transition to democracy.

== List of ministers ==
=== Kingdom of Spain (1700–1808) ===
| No. | Portrait | Name (born–died) | Term of office | | | Government | Ref. |
| No. | Portrait | Name (born–died) | Took office | Left office | Time in office | Government | Ref. |
Royal Secretary of State for the Navy and the Indies
First reign of Philip V (1700–1724)
| 1 | | Bernardo Tinajero de la Escalera (died 1718) | 3 December 1714 | 28 April 1715 | 146 days | Grimaldo I | |
Position abolished (At the beginning of 1715, the Secreteriat was suppressed, and its competencies were divided between the Secretariats of War and Justice).
| 2 | | Miguel Fernández Durán (1681–1721) | 1 December 1720 | 8 January 1721 | 38 days | Grimaldo I | |
| 3 | | Andrés Matías de Pes Marzaraga (1653–1723) | 14 January 1721 | 9 March 1723 † | 2 years, 54 days | Grimaldo I | |
Position abolished by the second time.
| 4 | | Antonio de Sopeña y Mioño (1678–1748) | 10 January 1724 | 15 January 1724 | 5 days | Grimaldo I | |
Reign of Louis I (1724)
| (4) | | Antonio de Sopeña y Mioño (1678–1748) | 15 January 1724 | 31 August 1724 | 229 days | Orendain I | |
Second reign of Philip V (1724–1746)
| (4) | | Antonio de Sopeña y Mioño (1678–1748) | 31 August 1724 | 21 May 1726 | 1 year, 263 days | Orendain I | |
| (4) | | Antonio de Sopeña y Mioño (1678–1748) | 31 August 1724 | 21 May 1726 | 1 year, 263 days | Grimaldo II | |
| (4) | | Antonio de Sopeña y Mioño (1678–1748) | 31 August 1724 | 21 May 1726 | 1 year, 263 days | Ripperda | |
| (4) | | Antonio de Sopeña y Mioño (1678–1748) | 31 August 1724 | 21 May 1726 | 1 year, 263 days | Grimaldo III | |
| 5 | | José Patiño y Rosales (1666–1736) | 21 May 1726 | 3 November 1736 † | 10 years, 166 days | Grimaldo III | |
| 5 | | José Patiño y Rosales (1666–1736) | 21 May 1726 | 3 November 1736 † | 10 years, 166 days | Orendáin II | |
| 5 | | José Patiño y Rosales (1666–1736) | 21 May 1726 | 3 November 1736 † | 10 years, 166 days | Patiño | |
| – | | Mateo Pablo Díaz de Lavandero (1681–1746); Interim | 3 November 1736 | 10 March 1739 | 2 years, 127 days | Villarías | |
| 7 | | Marquess of Villarías (1687–1766) | 10 March 1739 | 11 April 1743 | 4 years, 32 days | Villarías | |
| 8 | | Marquess of Ensenada (1702–1781) | 11 April 1743 | 9 July 1746 | 3 years, 59 days | Villarías | |
Reign of Ferdinand VI (1746–1759)
| (8) | | Marquess of Ensenada (1702–1781) | 9 July 1746 | 22 July 1754 | 8 years, 13 days | Villarías | |
| (8) | | Marquess of Ensenada (1702–1781) | 9 July 1746 | 22 July 1754 | 8 years, 13 days | Carvajal | |
| (8) | | Marquess of Ensenada (1702–1781) | 9 July 1746 | 22 July 1754 | 8 years, 13 days | Huéscar | |
| (8) | | Marquess of Ensenada (1702–1781) | 9 July 1746 | 22 July 1754 | 8 years, 13 days | Wall | |
Royal Secretary of State of the Navy
| 9 | | Julián de Arriaga y Ribera (1700–1776) | 22 July 1754 | 10 August 1759 | 5 years, 19 days | Wall | |
Reign of Charles III (1759–1788)
| (9) | | Julián de Arriaga y Ribera (1700–1776) | 10 August 1759 | 28 January 1776 † | 16 years, 169 days | Wall | |
| (9) | | Julián de Arriaga y Ribera (1700–1776) | 10 August 1759 | 28 January 1776 † | 16 years, 169 days | Grimaldi | |
| 10 | | Pedro González de Castejón (1719–1783) | 28 January 1776 | 9 March 1783 | 7 years, 42 days | Grimaldi | |
| 10 | | Pedro González de Castejón (1719–1783) | 28 January 1776 | 9 March 1783 | 7 years, 42 days | Floridablanca | |
| 11 | | Antonio Valdés y Fernández Bazán (1744–1816) | 9 March 1783 | 14 December 1788 | 5 years, 280 days | Floridablanca | |
| 11 | | Antonio Valdés y Fernández Bazán (1744–1816) | 9 March 1783 | 14 December 1788 | 5 years, 280 days | Supreme Council of State | |
Reign of Charles IV (1788–1808)
| (11) | | Antonio Valdés y Fernández Bazán (1744–1816) | 14 December 1788 | 13 November 1795 | 6 years, 334 days | Supreme Council of State | |
| (11) | | Antonio Valdés y Fernández Bazán (1744–1816) | 14 December 1788 | 13 November 1795 | 6 years, 334 days | Aranda | |
| (11) | | Antonio Valdés y Fernández Bazán (1744–1816) | 14 December 1788 | 13 November 1795 | 6 years, 334 days | Godoy | |
Position abolished (held by the First Secretary of State)
| 12 | | Francisco Gil de Taboada y Lemos (1733–1809) | 22 April 1806 | 19 March 1808 | 1 year, 332 days | Guerra I | |
| 12 | | Francisco Gil de Taboada y Lemos (1733–1809) | 22 April 1806 | 19 March 1808 | 1 year, 332 days | O'Farril | |
Reign of Ferdinand VII (1808)
| (12) | | Francisco Gil de Taboada y Lemos (1733–1809) | 19 March 1808 | 2 June 1808 | 75 days | Guerra II | |
| 13 | | José Mazarredo y Salazar (1745–1812) | 2 June 1808 | 7 July 1808 | 35 days | Guerra II | |

=== Napoleonic ===
- Antonio de Escaño (15 October 1808 – 10 January 1810)
- Gabriel Císcar Císcar (31 January 1810 – 1 November 1810)
- José de Mazarredo y Salazar (2 June 1808 – 29 July 1812)
- Gonzalo O'Farrill y Herrera (29 July de 1812–27 June de 1813)
- José Vázquez Figueroa (23 June 1812 – 18 April 1813)
- Francisco de Paula Ossorio y Vargas (18 April 1813 – 29 May 1814)

=== Ferdinand VII ===
- Luis María Salazar y Salazar (29 May 1814 – 27 January 1816)
- José Vázquez Figueroa (27 January 1816 – 14 September 1818)
- Baltasar Hidalgo de Cisneros (14 September 1818 – 13 June 1819)
- José María Alós Mora (13 June 1819 – 9 March 1820)
- Luis María Salazar y Salazar (9 March 1820 – 6 April 1820)
- Juan Jabat Aztal (6 April 1820 – 2 March 1821)
- Diego Méndez de la Vega Infanzón (2 March 1821 – 4 March 1821)
- Francisco de Paula Escudero (4 March 1821 – 18 January 1822)
- Francisco de Paula Ossorio y Vargas (18 January 1822 – 28 February 1822)
- Jacinto de Romarate Salamanca (28 February 1822 – 5 August 1822)
- Dionisio Capaz Rendón (5 August 1822 – 28 February 1823)
- Ramón Lorenzo Romay Jiménez de Cisneros (28 February 1823 – 20 April 1823)
- Antonio Campuzano (15 May 1823 – 18 May 1823)
- Francisco de Paula Ossorio y Vargas (18 May 1823 – 30 September 1823)
- Luis María Salazar y Salazar (27 May 1823 – 15 October 1832)
- Francisco Javier Ulloa (15 October 1832 – 25 March 1833)

=== Isabella II ===
- José de la Cruz (25 March 1833 – 16 November 1833)
- Antonio Remón Zarco del Valle y Huet (16 November 1833 – 15 January 1834)
- José Vázquez Figueroa (15 January 1834 – 13 June 1835)
- Miguel Ricardo Álava Esquivel (13 June 1835 – 28 August 1835)
- José Sartorio (28 August 1835 – 14 September 1835)
- Juan Álvarez Mendizábal (14 September 1835 – 2 May 1836)
- José María Chacón y Pery (2 May 1836 – 15 May 1836)
- Antonio Alcalá Galiano (15 May 1836 – 14 August 1836)
- Miguel Moreno (14 August 1836 – 18 August 1836)
- Andrés García Camba (18 August 1836 – 11 September 1836)

It was renamed "Ministry of the Navy, Commerce, Overseas Governance" (Ministerio de Marina, Comercio Y Gobernación de Ultramar)

- Ramón Gil de la Cuadra (11 September 1836 – 18 August 1837)
- Evaristo Fernández San Miguel Valledor (18 August 1837 – 1 October 1837)
- Francisco Javier Ulloa (1 October 1837 – 16 December 1837)
- Manuel de Cañas-Trujillo y Sánchez (16 December 1837 – 6 September 1838)
- Juan Antonio Aldama Irabien (6 September 1838 – 9 October 1838)
- José Antonio Ponzoa Cebrián (9 October 1838 – 6 December 1838)
- José María Chacón y Pery (6 December 1838 – 10 May 1839)
- Casimiro Vigodet Guernica (10 May 1839 – 12 June 1839)
- José Primo de Rivera (12 June 1839 – 21 October 1839)
- Isidro Alaix (21 October 1839 – 30 October 1839)
- Francisco Narváez (30 October 1839 – 16 November 1839)
- Manuel Montes de Oca (16 November 1839 – 8 April 1840)
- Juan de Dios Sotelo Machín (8 April 1840 – 18 July 1840)
- Francisco Armero Peñaranda (18 July 1840 – 11 September 1840)
- Dionisio Capaz Rendón (11 September 1840 – 16 September 1840)
- Joaquín de Frías (16 September 1840 – 20 May 1841)
- Andrés García Camba (21 May 1841–25 May 1842)
- Evaristo Fernández San Miguel Valledor (26 May 1842 – 17 June 1842)
- Dionisio Capaz Rendón (17 June 1842 – 9 May 1843)
- Joaquín de Frías (9 May 1843 – 19 May 1843)
- Olegario de los Cuetos y Castro (19 May 1843 – 30 July 1843)
- Joaquín de Frías (23 July 1843 – 1 December 1843)
- José Filiberto Portillo (5 December 1843 – 3 May 1844)
- Francisco Armero Peñaranda (3 May 1844 – 12 February 1846)
- Juan Bautista Topete y Viaña (12 February 1846 – 16 March 1846)
- Juan de la Pezuela y Cevallos (16 March 1846 – 3 April 1846)
- Jorge Pérez Lasso de la Vega (3 April 1846 – 5 April 1846)
- Francisco Armero Peñaranda (5 April 1846 – 28 April 1847)

Renamed Ministry of the Navy and Overseas Governance (Ministerio de Marina y Gobernación de Ultramar)

- José Baldasano (28 January 1847 – 15 February 1847)

Changed back to the title of Ministry of the Navy (Ministerio de Marina)

- Alejandro Oliván Borruel (15 February 1847 – 28 March 1847)
- Juan de Dios Sotelo Machín (28 March 1847 – 4 October 1847)
- Fernando Fernández de Cordova Valcárcel (5 October 1847 – 24 October 1847)
- Manuel Bertrán de Lis y Ribes, (24 October 1847 – 24 December 1847)
- Mariano Roca de Togores Carrasco (24 December 1847 – 19 October 1849)
- José María Bustillo Barreda (19 October 1849 – 20 October 1849)
- Mariano Roca de Togores Carrasco (20 October 1849 – 14 January 1851)
- José María Bustillo Barreda (14 January 1851 – 2 June 1851)
- Francisco Armero Peñaranda (2 June 1851 – 3 May 1852)
- Casimiro Vigodet Guernica (3 May 1852 – 13 June 1852)
- Joaquín Ezpeleta Enrile (13 June 1852 – 14 December 1852)
- Rafael Arístegui y Vélez (14 December 1852 – 14 April 1853)
- Antonio Doral (14 April 1853 – 9 September 1853)
- Agustín Esteban Collantes (9 September 1853 – 19 September 1853)
- Mariano Roca de Togores y Carrasco (19 September 1853 – 17 July 1854)
- Ángel Saavedra Ramírez de Baquedano (18 July 1854 – 20 July 1854)
- José Félix Allende-Salazar Mazarredo (30 July 1854 – 8 December 1854)
- Antonio Santa Cruz (8 December 1854 – 14 July 1856)
- Pedro Bayarri (14 July 1856 – 12 October 1856)
- Francisco Lersundi Hormaechea (12 October 1856 – 15 October 1857)
- Juan Salomón (15 October 1857 – 25 October 1857)
- José María Bustillo Barreda (25 October 1857 – 14 January 1858)
- José María Quesada (14 January 1858 – 25 November 1858)
- Leopoldo O'Donnell Joris (25 November 1858 – 27 November 1858)
- José MacCrohon y Blake (27 November 1858 – 9 July 1860)
- Juan Zavala de la Puente (9 July 1860 – 17 January 1863)
- José María Bustillo Barreda (17 January 1863 – 27 January 1863)
- Augusto Ulloa (9 February 1863 – 2 March 1863)
- Francisco Mata Alós (3 March 1863 – 17 January 1864)
- Joaquín Gutiérrez Rubalcaba Casal (17 January 1864 – 1 March 1864)
- José Pareja Septién (1 March 1864 – 16 September 1864)
- Francisco Armero Peñaranda (16 September 1864 – 21 June 1865)
- Juan Zavala De La Puente (21 June 1865 – 10 July 1866)
- Eusebio Calonge (10 July 1866 – 13 July 1866)
- Joaquín Gutiérrez Rubalcaba Casal (13 July 1866 – 27 June 1867)
- Martín Belda (27 June 1867 – 11 February 1868)
- Carlos Marfori (11 February 1868 – 13 February 1868)
- Severo Catalina del Amo (13 February 1868 – 23 April 1868)
- Martín Belda (23 April 1868 – 19 September 1868)
- José Gutiérrez de la Concha (19 September 1868 – 21 September 1868)

=== Provisional junta, Regency, and Amadeo I ===
- Antonio Estrada González Guiral (21 September 1868 – 8 October 1868)
- Juan Bautista Topete y Carballo (8 October 1868 – 6 November 1869)
- Juan Prim y Prats (6 November 1869 – 9 January 1870)
- Juan Bautista Topete y Carballo (9 January 1870 – 20 March 1870)
- José María Beránger Ruiz de Apodaca (20 March 1870 – 5 October 1871)
- José Malcampo y Monge (5 October 1871 – 26 May 1872)
- Juan Bautista Topete y Carballo (26 May 1872 – 13 June 1872)
- José María Beránger Ruiz de Apodaca (13 June 1872 – 24 February 1873)

=== First Republic ===
- Jacobo Oreyro y Villavicencio (24 February 1873 – 11 June 1873)
- Federico Anrich Santamaría (11 June 1873 – 18 July 1873)
- Jacobo Oreyro y Villavicencio (18 July 1873 – 4 September 1873)
- José Oreyro y Villavicencio (4 September 1873 – 3 January 1874)
- Juan Bautista Topete y Carballo (3 January 1874 – 13 May 1874)
- Rafael Rodríguez de Arias Villavicencio (13 May 1874 – 31 December 1874)

=== Bourbon Restoration ===
- Mariano Roca de Togores Carrasco (31 December 1874 – 9 February 1875)
- Antonio Cánovas del Castillo (9 February 1875 – 8 June 1875)
- Santiago Durán Lira (8 June 1875 – 1 April 1876)
- Juan Bautista Antequera y Bobadilla (1 April 1876 – 23 September 1877)
- Francisco de Paula Pavía y Pavía (23 September 1877 – 9 December 1879)
- Santiago Durán Lira (9 December 1879 – 8 February 1881)
- Francisco de Paula Pavía Pavía (8 February 1881 – 9 January 1883)
- Arsenio Martínez-Campos Antón (9 January 1883 – 13 January 1883)
- Rafael Rodríguez de Arias Villavicencio (13 January 1883 – 13 October 1883)
- Carlos Valcárcel Usell de Gimbarda (13 October 1883 – 18 January 1884)
- Juan Bautista Antequera y Bobadilla (18 January 1884 – 13 July 1885)
- Manuel de la Pezuela y Lobo (13 July 1885 – 27 November 1885)
- José María Beránger Ruiz de Apodaca (27 November 1885 – 10 October 1886)
- Rafael Rodríguez de Arias Villavicencio (10 October 1886 – 21 January 1890)
- Juan Romero Moreno (21 January 1890 – 5 July 1890)
- José María Beránger Ruiz de Apodaca (5 July 1890 – 5 November 1891)
- Antonio Cánovas del Castillo (5 November 1891 – 23 November 1891)
- Florencio Montojo Trillo (23 November 1891 – 11 March 1892)
- José María Beránger Ruiz de Apodaca (11 March 1892 – 11 December 1892)
- José López Domínguez (11 December 1892 – 14 December 1892)
- Pascual Cervera y Topete (14 December 1892 – 23 March 1893)
- Manuel Pasquín de Juan (12 March 1894 – 23 March 1895)
- José María Beránger Ruiz de Apodaca (23 March 1895 – 4 October 1897)
- Segismundo Bermejo y Merelo (4 October 1897 – 18 May 1898)
- Ramón Auñón y Villalón (18 May 1898 – 4 March 1899)
- José Gómez-Imaz Simón (5 March 1899 – 18 April 1900)
- Francisco Silvela Le Vielleuze (18 de abril de 1900–23 de octubre de 1900)
- Marcelo Azcárraga Palmero (23 October 1900 – 31 October 1900)
- José Ramos Izquierdo y Castañeda (31 October 1900 – 6 March 1901)
- Cristóbal Colón de la Cerda (6 March 1901 – 6 December 1902)
- Joaquín Sánchez de Toca Calvo (6 December 1902 – 20 July 1903)
- Eduardo Cobián y Roffignac (20 July 1903 – 5 December 1903)
- José Ferrándiz y Niño (5 December 1903 – 16 December 1904)
- Marcelo Azcarraga Palmero (16 December 1904 – 6 January 1905)
- Eduardo Cobián y Roffignac (6 January 1905 – 23 June 1905)
- Miguel Villanueva Gómez (23 June 1905 – 31 October 1905)
- Valeriano Weyler Nicolau (31 October 1905 – 1 December 1905)
- Víctor María Concas Palau (4 December 1905 – 6 July 1906)
- Juan Alvarado del Saz (6 July 1906 – 30 November 1906)
- Santiago Alba Bonifaz (30 November 1906 – 4 December 1906)
- Juan Jácome Pareja (9 December 1906 – 25 January 1907)
- José Ferrándiz y Niño (25 January 1907 – 21 October 1909)
- Víctor María Concas Palau (21 October 1909 – 9 February 1910)
- Diego Arias de Miranda Goytia (9 February 1910 – 3 April 1911)
- José Pidal Rebollo (3 April 1911 – 31 December 1912)
- Amalio Gimeno y Cabañas (31 December 1912 – 27 October 1913)
- Augusto Miranda y Godoy (27 October 1913 – 11 June 1917)
- Manuel de Flórez y Carrió (11 June 1917 – 3 November 1917)
- Amalio Gimeno y Cabañas (3 November 1917 – 22 March 1918)
- José Pidal Rebollo (22 March 1918 – 20 July 1918)
- Augusto Miranda y Godoy (20 July 1918 – 9 November 1918)
- José María Chacón y Pery (9 November 1918 – 15 April 1919)
- Augusto Miranda y Godoy (15 April 1919 – 20 July 1919)
- Manuel de Flórez y Carrió (20 July 1919 – 17 March 1920)
- Eduardo Dato Iradier (5 May 1920 – 8 March 1921)
- Joaquín Fernández Prida (13 March 1921 – 14 August 1921)
- José Gómez Acebo (14 August 1921 – 8 March 1922)
- Mariano Ordóñez García (8 March 1922 – 1 April 1922)
- José Rivera Álvarez de Canero (1 April 1922 – 7 December 1922)
- Luis Silvela Casado (7 December 1922 – 16 December 1923)
- Juan Bautista Aznar-Cabañas (16 February 1923 – 15 September 1923)

=== Primo de Rivera dictatorship ===
- Gabriel Antón Iboleón (15 September 1923 – 5 February 1924)
- Federico Ibáñez Valera (5 February 1924 – 12 February 1924)
- Ignacio Pintado Gough (12 February 1924 – 25 May 1924)
- Honorio Cornejo Carvajal (25 May 1924 – 3 November 1928)
- Mateo García de los Reyes (5 November 1928 – 30 January 1930)
- Salvador Carvia Caravaca (30 January 1930 – 18 February 1931)
- José Rivera Álvarez de Canero (19 February 1931 – 14 April 1931)

=== Second Republic ===
- Santiago Casares Quiroga (14 April 1931 – 14 October 1931)
- José Giral Pereira (14 October 1931 – 12 June 1933)
- Lluís Companys Jover (12 June 1933 – 12 September 1933)
- Vicente Iranzo Enguita (12 September 1933 – 8 October 1933)
- Leandro Pita Romero (8 October 1933 – 16 December 1933)
- Juan José Rocha García (16 December 1933 – 23 January 1935)
- Gerardo Abad Conde (23 January 1935 – 3 April 1935)
- Francisco Javier de Salas González (3 April 1935 – 6 May 1935)
- Antonio Royo Villanova (6 May 1935 – 25 September 1935)
- Pedro Rahola Molinas (25 September 1935 – 14 December 1935)
- Francisco Javier de Salas González (14 December 1935 – 30 December 1935)
- Antonio Azarola y Gresillón (30 December 1935 – 19 February 1936)
- José Giral Pereira (19 February 1936 – 22 August 1936)
- Francisco Matz Sánchez (22 August 1936 – 4 September 1936)

Renamed into the Ministry of the Navy and Air (Ministerio de Marina y Aire)

- Indalecio Prieto Tuero, (4 September 1936 – 17 May 1937)

Integrated into the Ministry of National Defense (Ministerio de Defensa Nacional)

=== Francoist era, and transition to democracy ===
| No. | Portrait | Name (Birth–Death) | Term of office | | | Political party | Government | Ref. |
| No. | Portrait | Name (Birth–Death) | Took office | Left office | Time in office | Political party | Government | Ref. |
|---|---|---|---|---|---|---|---|---|
| 1 | | Admiral; Salvador Moreno Fernández (1886–1966) | 9 August 1939 | 20 July 1945 | 5 years, 345 days | Military | Franco II | |
| 2 | | Admiral; Francisco Regalado (1881–1958) | 20 July 1945 | 19 July 1951 | 5 years, 364 days | Military | Franco III | |
| (1) | | Admiral; Salvador Moreno Fernández (1886–1966) | 19 July 1951 | 25 February 1957 | 5 years, 221 days | Military | Franco IV | |
| 3 | | Admiral; Felipe José Abárzuza (1896–1970) | 25 February 1957 | 11 July 1962 | 5 years, 136 days | Military | Franco V | |
| 4 | | Admiral; Pedro Nieto Antúnez (1898–1978) | 11 July 1962 | 30 October 1969 | 7 years, 111 days | Military | Franco VI–VII | |
| 5 | | Admiral; Adolfo Baturone Colombo (1904–1999) | 30 October 1969 | 9 June 1973 | 3 years, 222 days | Military | Franco VIII | |
| 6 | | Admiral; Gabriel Pita da Veiga (1909–1993) | 12 June 1973 | 14 April 1977 | 3 years, 306 days | Military | Carrero Blanco; Arias Navarro I–II; Suárez I | |
| 7 | | Admiral; Pascual Pery (1911–1989) | 14 April 1977 | 5 July 1977 | 82 days | Military | Suárez I | |

==== Timeline ====
Integrated into the Ministry of Defence (Ministerio de Defensa).

== See also ==
- Chief of Staff of the Navy (Spain)
