= Spanish warship Destructor =

Spanish Navy torpedo gunboat of 1887–1908

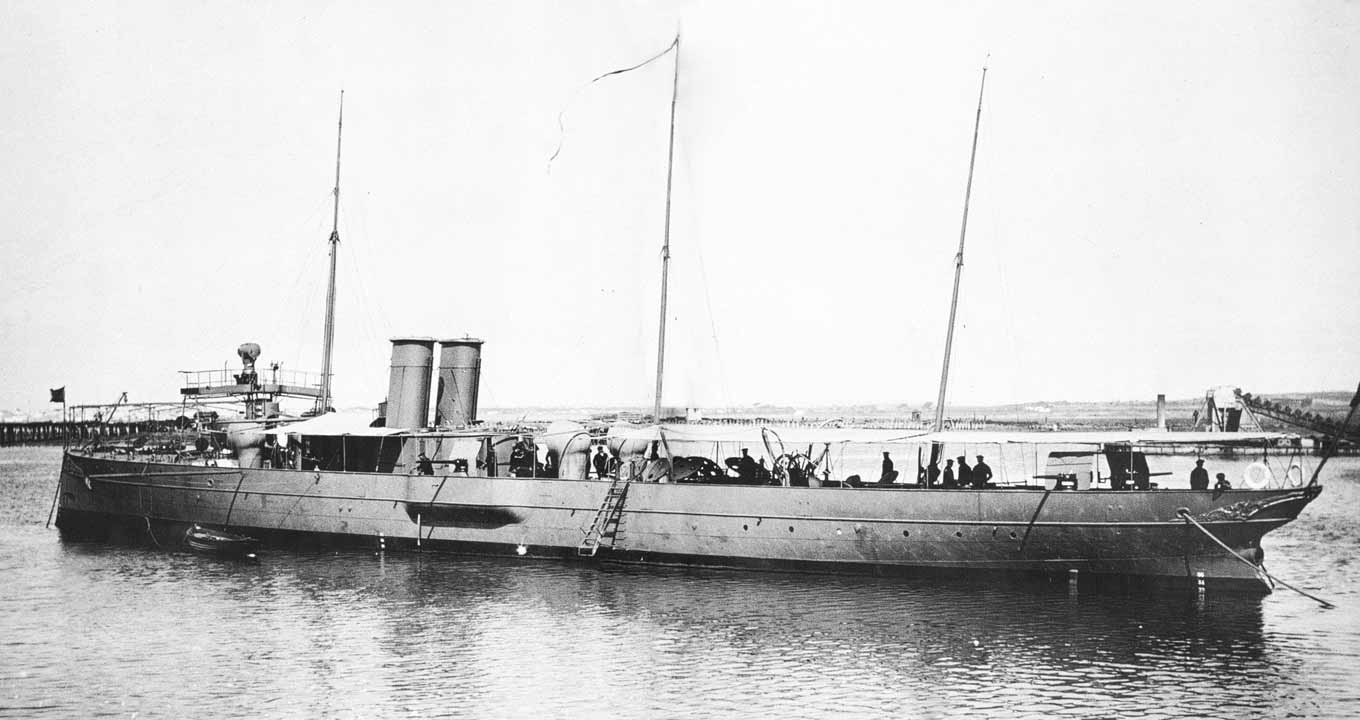
- Destructor as built, with her funnels arranged abreast of one another.

History

Spain
- Name: Destructor
- Ordered: 1885
- Builder: James and George Thomson, Clydebank, United Kingdom
- Laid down: 14 November 1885
- Launched: 29 July 1886
- Commissioned: 19 January 1887
- Decommissioned: 1 January 1908
- Fate: Sold December 1911; Scrapped

General characteristics
- Type: Destroyer
- Displacement: 340 or 348 long tons (345 or 354 t) (standard); 458 long tons (465 t) (full load)
- Length: 58.74 m (192 ft 9 in)
- Beam: 7.63 m (25 ft 0 in)
- Draught: 2.5 m (8 ft 2 in)
- Depth: 2.98 m (9 ft 9 in)
- Propulsion: two triple-expansion engines 3,784 hp (2,822 kW), four locomotive boilers, two shafts
- Speed: 22.6 knots (41.9 km/h; 26.0 mph) (at standard load); 20.2 knots (23.2 mph; 37.4 km/h) (at full load)
- Range: 4,000 nmi (7,400 km; 4,600 mi) at 10 knots (18.5 km/h; 11.5 mph)
- Complement: 45 or 60 (see text)
- Armament: 1 × 90mm (3.5in) gun; 4 × 57mm (2.2in) guns; 2 × 37 mm (1.5 in) guns; 2 to 5 × 356 or 381 mm (14 or 15 in) torpedo tubes (see text)

Destructor (English: Destroyer) was a Spanish Navy warship in commission from 1887 to 1908. She was a fast, ocean-going torpedo gunboat and was one of the most important precursors of the destroyer type of naval vessels. Destructor was the first warship formally classified as a "destroyer" at the time of her commissioning. She took part in Spanish operations during the First Melillan Campaign in North Africa in 1893. She also served during the Spanish-American War in 1898 but did not see combat during that conflict.

== Genesis ==
From the invention of the Whitehead torpedo — the first self-propelled torpedo — in 1866 through the 1870s and 1880s, the rapidly improving, cheap, and fast torpedo boat presented a rising threat to major warships. Coastal escort vessels of increasing size and capability were already in use to protect battleships — which at the time sank fairly easily if struck by underwater weapons such as torpedoes — from these short-range torpedo boats. Following his study of the situation, Spanish Navy Teniente de navío de 1ª clase (Ship-of-the-Line Lieutenant First Class) Fernando Villaamil advised the Spanish Minister of the Navy, Vicealmirante (Vice Admiral) Manuel Pezuela, that what was needed was a new type of enlarged torpedo gunboat, fast and powerful enough to intercept and destroy torpedo boats, with the range and seaworthiness to escort capital ships on long voyages, and capable of attacking enemy battleships with torpedoes as part of a fleet action. Villaamil drew up the specifications for such a ship, and these specifications became the basis of the "torpedo boat destroyer" type — which became known as the destroyer type in the early 20th century — a concept quickly adopted by other navies. The aim of the new destroyer design in the navies of the world was not only to neutralize the torpedo boat as an effective weapon, but also to replace it as a faster and more reliable torpedo-carrying warship.

In terms of gunnery, speed and dimensions, Destructor is widely considered the first torpedo-boat destroyer ever built, and was described as such by British naval engineer Sir William Henry White. Destructor is thought to have influenced the design and concept of later destroyers developed by the British Royal Navy, in which further developments followed the pattern of the Havock class, built in 1893.

== Construction and commissioning ==
After Pezuela approved Villaamil's specifications for the new warship, he ordered Villaamil to travel to London in 1885 to develop his project further and commission its construction in the United Kingdom. The Spanish Navy asked several British shipyards to submit proposals capable of fulfilling Villaamil's specifications. It chose the design submitted by the shipyard of James and George Thomson of Clydebank, Scotland. The ship was laid down on 14 November 1885 and received the name Destructor — Spanish for "destroyer," because of her intended role as a destroyer of torpedo boats — by a royal decree of 21 December 1885. Launched on 29 July 1886, she reached 22.98 knots (42.56 km/h; 26.44 mph) during sea trials. She was commissioned on 19 January 1887 with Villaamil in command.

== Characteristics ==
Profile of Destructor with its appearance in 1890.

Profile of Destructor with its appearance in 1900.

Destructor displaced 348 long tons (354 t) or 380 long tons (386 t) at standard displacement and 458 long tons (465 t) at full load, according to different sources. She was 58.74 metres (192 ft 9 in) long and had a beam of 7.63 metres (25 ft 0 in), a depth of hull of 2.98 metres (9 ft 9 in), and a draft of 2.46 metres (8 ft 1 in).

Destructor was one of the first ships with triple-expansion engines. She had two of the engines — fed by four locomotive boilers — which generated either 3,784 horsepower (2,822 kW) or 3,800 horsepower (2,834 kW), according to different sources, giving her a maximum speed of 22.6 knots (41.9 km/h; 26.0 mph) at standard displacement and 20.2 knots (37.4 km/h; 23.2 mph) at full load, which made her one of the faster ships in the world in 1888. In service, she generally achieved around 20 knots (37 km/h; 23 mph). At standard displacement she carried 37 tons of coal, while at full load she could carry 93 tons; sources give two different ranges for her — 2,000 nautical miles (3,700 km; 2,300 mi) at economical cruising speed and 4,000 nautical miles (7,400 km; 4,600 mi) at 10 knots (18.5 km/h; 11.5 mph) — without specifying the coal tonnage associated with the shorter range but identifying the longer range as with her maximum coal capacity.

Sources differ widely on Destructor′s torpedo armament. One claims that she had two 356-millimetre (14 in) torpedo tubes, both forward, with three Schwartzkopff torpedoes per tube, another that she had two 381-millimetre (15 in) tubes with three Schwartzkopff torpedoes per tube. Another source claims that she had three Schwatrzkopf — implying 356-millimetre (14 in) — torpedo tubes, two forward and one aft, and still another that she had five 381-millimetre (15 in) tubes, with two forward, one aft, and two on a trainable mount amidships. Destructor′s armament also included one Spanish-designed 90 mm (3.5 in) Hontoria breech-loading gun, four 57 mm (2.2 in) (6-pounder) Nordenfeldt guns, and two 37 mm (1.46 in) (3-pounder) Hotchkiss revolving cannons.

Destructor had three folding masts for staysails and two jibs. She had two raked funnels abreast of one another, a ram bow, and a transom stern. Eighteen millimeters (0.75 inch) of splinter plating protected her conning tower and machinery spaces. One source claims her crew consisted of 45 officers and enlisted men, while other sources state that she had a crew of 60.

== Service history ==
=== 1887–1893 ===
Destructor sometime between 1887 and 1897.

Destructor began her delivery voyage from the United Kingdom to Spain at Falmouth, Cornwall, getting underway on 24 January 1887. Despite encountering high winds and rough seas, she averaged 18 knots (33 km/h; 21 mph) during the voyage. One source claims the voyage established a speed record of 24 hours from Falmouth to Ferrol, while another claims that she arrived in Spain at Vigo on 25 January.

After a brief call at Vigo, Destructor got back underway on 25 January 1887 bound for Cádiz, which she reached on 2 February 1887. On 22 June 1887 she departed Cádiz and headed for Cartagena, where she conducted slow-speed and gunnery trials. After completing them, she entered the shipyard at the Cartagena Naval Base to have her hull cleaned. On 16 July 1887, Prince Alfred, the Duke of Edinburgh, who was in command of a British Royal Navy squadron that was visiting Cartagena, boarded Destructor, which at his request steamed at full speed and conducted a torpedo-firing exercise for him.

Destructor departed Cartagena on 20 July 1887 and made a port call at Cádiz, then got back underway on 22 July and proceeded to Ferrol, arriving there on 27 July. She made her first visit to Spain's northern coast in August 1887, cruising across the Cantabrian Sea to San Sebastián, where Queen Regent Maria Christina, Prime Minister Práxedes Mateo Sagasta, and Minister of the Navy Vicealmirante (Vice Admiral) Rafael Rodríguez de Arias Villavicencio embarked on Destructor on 22 August. With them aboard, she steamed to Cape Machichaco, escorted by the protected cruiser Lepanto and the steamer Ferrolano. Queen Maria Christina disembarked at Santander. With the queen, prime minister, and minister of the navy observing from aboard the unprotected cruiser Castilla, Destructor conducted maneuvers off San Sebastián on 25 August, during which she fired salutes to the dignitaries, maneuvered at speed, and launched torpedoes at a target. Destructor then remained at San Sebastián until 10 September to serve as the royal yacht and conduct maneuvers with the torpedo boat Ariete. On 20 Septenmber, she departed Bilbao bound for San Sebastián in company with Ferrolano and the gunboat Tajo. On 26 September she departed San Sebastián and proceeded to Ferrol, which she reached on 27 September. She entered dry dock at the Ferrol Naval Base for rudder repairs.

With her repairs complete, Destructor left dry dock in March 1888. On 5 April, she put to sea from Ferrol in company with the torpedo boats Ariete, Azor, Habana, Halcón, and Rayo bound for Cartagena, where plans called for them to rendezvous with other torpedo boats and conduct exercises. During the voyage to Cartagena, the ships encountered a severe storm as they rounded Cape Finisterre. One of Habana′s boilers exploded, killing two stokers and two sailors. Powerless and adrift, Habana ran aground at Cape Toriñana. At risk of being wrecked herself, Destructor came to Habana′s assistance, refloated her, and towed her to Corcubión. Although authorities submitted a request to award the Laureate Cross of Saint Ferdinand to Villaamil, Habana′s commanding officer Teniente de navío (Ship-of-the-Line Lieutenant) Juan José Ozamiz y Ostolaza, a petty officer, and two sailors for their actions in saving Habana, no awards were made due to what authorities described as "paperwork" issues.

The ships reached Cartagena and began seven weeks of maneuvers with the torpedo boat division later in April 1888. In addition to Destructor and the torpedo boats that had arrived from Ferrol, the exercises included the unprotected cruisers Castilla and Navarra, the armored frigate Numancia, the screw frigate Gerona, and the torpedo boats Acevedo, Barceló, Ordóñez, and Retamosa.

Although the maneuvers continued until 30 June, Destructor left them in May to be showcased at the 1888 Barcelona Universal Exposition at Barcelona. She embarked Queen Maria Cristina at Valencia and arrived at Barcelona in time for the Exposition's opening day on 20 May 1888. During her stay at Barcelona, she served as the royal yacht, transporting the queen during her visits to each of the ships in the squadron visiting Barcelona for the exposition, and the queen observed a demonstration by the Torpedo Boat Division while aboard Destructor. Destructor departed Barcelona on 5 June under escort by the protected cruisers Isla de Cuba and Isla de Luzón and arrived at Valencia on 6 June.

Destructor arrived at Vigo on 19 June 1888 and later moved to Ferrol, where she remained until the summer of 1889. She proceeded to San Sebastián on 1 August 1889 for service as Queen Maria Cristina′s royal yacht. Several dignitaries visited Destructor at San Sebastián before she made a tour of the Basque coast of Spain from 10 to 15 September 1889. Vicealmirante (Vice admiral) Juan Bautista Antequera y Bobadilla, a former minister of the navy, embarked on Destructor at Deva, and the ship returned to San Sebastián at the end of September 1889. She later called at Bilbao before arriving at Ferrol on 15 October 1889. In November 1889, Villaamil relinquished command of her.

Destructor spent several months in reserve at Ferrol before returning to the Basque coast in the summer of 1890 for another stint as the royal yacht. While transporting Minister of the Navy José María Beránguer from Santander to Bilbao so that he could attend the launch of the armored cruiser Infanta Maria Teresa at Sestao, Destructor suffered serious rudder damage off Cape Machichaco on 30 August 1890 during a severe storm. She limped into port at Castro Urdiales using only one engine and her sails. She was towed to Bilbao on 31 August. After emergency repairs, she moved on to Ferrol at the end of September 1890, where she remained under repair at Ferrol Naval Base until April 1891.

With her repairs complete, Destructor got underway from Ferrol and called at Cádiz before proceeding to Barcelona, where she arrived on 3 May 1891. The Training Squadron — composed of the battleship Pelayo and the protected cruisers Reina Regente and Isla de Luzón — was waiting for her there. The four ships departed Barcelona on 12 May and made a cruise in which they visited several ports in Italy, Greece, Rhodes, Jaffa in the Ottoman Empire, Alexandria in the Khedivate of Egypt, and Malta. They concluded the cruise with their return to Spain at Cartagena on 27 June. Destructor departed Cartagena on 19 July bound for Ferrol, then got underway from Ferrol on 6 August and stopped at Bilbao before arriving at San Sebastián. She made a cruise to several ports along Spain's northern coast before returning to Ferrol on 19 October 1891 and going into reserve until 1892.

In September 1893, the Training Squadron began maneuvers between Cabo de Gata and Cabo de San Antonio under the command of Contralmirante (Counter Admiral) Zoilo Sánchez de Ocaña y Vieitiz, who later became Spain's first Chief of Staff of the Navy. The squadron sortied from Cartagena on 15 September and divided into two divisions to simulate a battle in the waters off Alicante, with one division made up of Pelayo, Isla de Cuba, the unprotected cruiser Reina Mercedes, and the torpedo boats Barceló, Rayo, and Rigel, and the other of Destructor, Reina Regente, the unprotected cruiser Alfonso XII, and the torpedo boats Ariete and Habana. The squadron anchored at Santa Pola on 16 September. With violence between Spaniards and Riffians around Melilla on the coast of North Africa escalating, resulting in the beginning of the First Melillan Campaign on 3 October, the squadron suspended its maneuvers and on 9 October departed Alicante bound for Cartagena, where they arrived later the same day to refuel and take on fresh water and provisions. Leaving the torpedo boats behind at Cartagena, the rest of the ships then headed south towards the North African coast to support Spanish forces fighting the Riffians. On 8 November 1893, Destructor, Pelayo, Reina Mercedes, Reina Regente, Alfonso XII, Isla de Cuba, the unprotected cruiser Conde de Venadito, the torpedo boats Habana and Temerario, and artillery in Spanish fortifications bombarded a Riffian camp after the Riffians ignored a Spanish demand that they refrain from hostile actions against Spanish forces.

=== 1894–1897 ===
Off North Africa, Destructor began to experience problems with her boilers that reduced her maximum speed to only about 10 knots (19 km/h; 12 mph). She entered the Arsenal de La Carraca at San Fernando for a refit at the beginning of 1894, but her propulsion problems remained unresolved. In mid-August 1894, she got underway from Cádiz bound for Cartagena with orders to conduct maneuvers off Santa Pola from 20 August to 20 September 1894 with the torpedo boats Ariete, Barceló, Habana, Rayo, Retamosa, and Rigel, but instead remained inactive at Cartagena from August 1894 to July 1895 and underwent another refit. At the end of July 1895 she began post-refit sea trials off Cartagena. After completing them, she steamed to Vigo, arriving there on 7 August, and then moved on to Ferrol, which she reached on 8 August 1895.

Destructor departed Ferrol on 10 September 1895, escorting the armored cruiser Infanta María Teresa to the shipyards at Nervión, where Infanta Maria Teresa was to undergo repairs. Both ships arrived at Bilbao in mid-September, then returned to Ferrol on 22 September 1895. On 23 September, Destructor got underway from Ferrol with the armored cruiser Almirante Oquendo. On 25 September, the two ships arrived at Cádiz, where they joined the Training Squadron, which also included Pelayo, the armored cruiser Vizcaya, and the protected cruiser Marqués de la Ensenada, later joined by the protected cruiser Alfonso XII. Still experiencing propulsion problems, Destructor entered the shipyard at the Arsenal de La Carraca for boiler repairs. Although she was scheduled to rejoin the Training Squadron by mid-October 1895, she still was under repair in December 1895, when the Training Squadron began a Mediterranean cruise without her.

After leaving the shipyard, Destructor visited Mahón on Menorca in the Balearic Islands. She got underway from Mahón on 14 January 1896 bound for Cádiz. On 18 February 1896, she departed Cádiz, made a stop at Lisbon, Portugal, and on 23 February arrived at Ferrol, where she joined the Training Squadron, which now consisted of Pelayo, Almirante Oquendo, Infanta María Teresa, Vizcaya, and the torpedo boats Azor and Halcón. While the squadron conducted maneuvers in the Ría de Arousa, Destructor remained behind due to the poor condition of her engines. On 16 June 1896, Destructor departed Ferrol bound for Barcelona in company with Pelayo, Almirante Oquendo, Infanta María Teresa, and Vizcaya, but during the voyage she suffered rudder damage off Cabo de Gata. She moored at Cartagena, then got back underway on 29 September and proceeded to San Fernando, where she entered dry dock at the Arsenal de La Carraca for repairs.

With her repairs complete, Destructor departed Cádiz on 4 October 1896 and arrived at Melilla on 5 October. She transported the Spanish Army chief of staff at Melilla, General de brigada (Brigadier General) José Marina Vega, to Alhucemas (now Al Hoceima), calling there on 20 October. She returned to Melilla a few days later and then steamed to Cádiz.

Destructor after her 1897 refit, with her funnels arranged in a new configuration, with one aft of the other.

Towards the end of January 1897, Destructor got underway from Cádiz, stopped at Vigo, and then proceeded to Ferrol. On 28 February 1897, she departed Ferrol and steamed to Glasgow, Scotland, to have her original locomotive boilers replaced with new Normand boilers, which also required the rearrangement of her funnels into a new configuration, with one aft of the other. After completion of the work, she departed Falmouth in the later part of June and returned to Spain, reaching a speed of 22 knots (41 km/h; 25 mph) during the voyage before arriving at Ferrol on 25 June 1897.

Destructor arrived at San Sebastián on 4 July 1897 to embark the Captain General of the Ferrol Maritime Department, Vicealmirante (Vice Admiral) Alejandro Arias-Salgado y Álvarez-Trelles, for transportation to Ferrol. She returned to Ferrol on 9 July. In August 1897, Destructor, Almirante Oquendo, Infanta María Teresa, and Vizcaya had their hulls cleaned and painted at the Ferrol Naval Base. In mid-August, they took on coal and departed for Cádiz.

Destructor soon returned to Ferrol, then rendezvoused with the Training Squadron on 5 September 1897 at Marín. The squadron, commanded by Contralmirante (Counter Admiral) Segismundo Bermejo y Merelo, arrived on the morning of 11 September at Lisbon, where Destructor, Almirante Oquendo, Infanta María Teresa, and Vizcaya attended the opening of the Maritime Exhibition in Estoril, Portugal. The armored cruiser Cristóbal Colón soon joined them. Destructor and the four armored cruisers arrived at Cádiz later in September. Destructor took on coal, provisions, and ammunition at Cádiz on 27 September and departed on 28 September to patrol the coast of Spanish Morocco. She anchored at Tangier on 1 October 1897.

Destructor rendezvoused at Cádiz with the Training Squadron, which now was under the command of Contralmirante (Counter Admiral) Pascual Cervera y Topete. The squadron's heavy ships — Almirante Oquendo, Infanta María Teresa, Vizcaya, and Cristóbal Colón — departed Cádiz on 27 November 1897 to carry out maneuvers off Santa Pola, leaving Destructor and the destroyers Furor and Terror behind to have their hulls cleaned. When that work was done, Destructor and the two destroyers departed Cádiz and called at Málaga from 10 to 12 December before proceeding to Santa Pola to join the maneuvers. The maneuvers — limited by Minister of the Navy Contralmirante (Counter Admiral) Segismundo Bermejo y Merelo's advice that Cervera conserve fuel and ammunition — focused on crew training and testing of the ships' guns, although the armored cruisers were permitted to fire only two rounds from each of their large-caliber guns. Destructor, Furor, Terror, and the torpedo boats Ariete, Azor, and Rayo joined together for several exercises during the maneuvers, including mock night attacks on the armored cruisers. The maneuvers wrapped up on 22 December 1897, and the squadron called at Alicante on 23 December and arrived at Cartagena on 28 December 1897.

=== Spanish-American War ===
Amid rising tension between Spain and the United States, the United States Navy armored cruiser (often referred to as a "battleship") USS Maine exploded and sank in the harbor at Havana, Cuba, on 15 February 1898. As the Spanish Navy deployed for a possible war with the United States, Destructor got underway from Cartagena on 29 March with Infanta María Teresa and Cristóbal Colón. While the two armored cruisers reached Cádiz on 29 March, Destructor called at Alicante, then stopped briefly at Málaga on 4 April before reaching Algeciras on 5 April and Cádiz on 6 April.

The Spanish-American War broke out when the United States declared war on Spain on 25 April 1898, stipulating that the declaration was retroactive to 21 April. During the war, Destructor served as the flagship of the 3rd Torpedo Boat Division, which was tasked with defending the waters of the Mediterranean Sea off the Cartagena Naval Department. In May 1898, she was at Cádiz. By mid-June 1898, she was at Algeciras with the torpedo boat Halcón and the gunboat Águila.

The war ended in August 1898 without Destructor seeing combat. The Spanish Navy suffered heavy losses during the war, which resulted in a one-sided defeat of Spain. As a result of the conflict, the Spanish Empire lost control of Cuba, Puerto Rico, the Philippines, and Guam.

=== 1898–1907 ===
Destructor departed Cartagena on 14 December 1898 and steamed to Ceuta on the coast of North Africa, then returned to Cartagena on 1 January 1899. At the end of July 1899, she entered dry dock at the Arsenal de La Carraca at San Fernando to have her hull cleaned. After that, she operated along the coast of Spanish Morocco, returning to Cádiz in mid-May 1900. In late May 1900 she began making voyages to Tangier carrying diplpomatic correspondence. In late August 1900, she sailed from Cádiz to test her engines, and in early October 1900 she was under repair at the Arsenal de La Carraca.

A revolutionary design when new, Destructor was outclassed by modern destroyers by the beginning of the 20th century, and she was relegated to gunboat-like operations off Spain's southern coast. In February 1904, she arrived at Cádiz. In April 1904, she joined the Training Squadron, then under the command of Contralmirante (Counter Admiral) Enrique Santaló y Sáenz de Tejada. When King Alfonso XIII visited Cádiz, he boarded Destructor on 5 May 1904 to be transferred to the royal yacht Giralda. Destructor, the armored cruiser Princesa de Asturias, and the protected cruisers Extremadura and Río de la Plata then escorted Giralda to Rota. While the three cruisers remained anchored at Rota, Destructor accompanied Giralda as she steamed up the Guadalquivir River to Seville.

Destuctor arrived at Málaga in the latter part of May 1904. In late July 1904 she arrived at Tangier due to rising tensions in the area during the Perdicaris affair with orders to support the Spanish consul there.

In mid-March 1906, Destructor was in Cartagena with the Training Squadron, which was under the command of Contralmirante (Counter Admiral) Juan José García de la Matta y Valle. When the squadron departed for Cádiz and the Canary Islands, Destructor parted company with it and instead steamed to Melilla. In April 1906 she made several voyages along the coast of North Africa between Melilla, Ceuta, and Tangier, including a voyage in which she escorted the gunboat María de Molina as María de Molina transported the Moroccan representatives to the Algeciras Conference to Tangier. She then was stationed at Ceuta in April 1906 to protect Spanish fishermen from Moorish attacks. On the morning of 21 November 1906, Pelayo, María de Molina, and the unprotected cruiser Infanta Isabel departed Cádiz for Tangier carrying a battalion of Spanish Marine Infantry. Destructor, Extremadura, Río de la Plata, and the armored cruiser Emperador Carlos V later also steamed from Cádiz to Tangier.

Although the Ministry of the Navy announced in May 1907 that Destructor would be decommissioned, she remained in commission for a time performiong escort and gunboat duties along the coast of North Africa. At dawn on 8 August 1907, she got underway from Cádiz and steamed to Tangier. She remained there until the coastal defense ship Numancia replaced her on that station during the first week of September 1907, then returned to Cádiz. She arrived at Melilla on 6 October 1907 and embarked Spanish Army General de división (Divisional General) José Marina Vega and his staff, departing that same day to transport them to Tangier. She arrived at Cádiz on 12 October 1907.

== Disposal ==
Destructor was decommissioned on 1 January 1908. She remained at Cádiz until she was sold in December 1911. She subsequently was scrapped.
