= Spanish cruiser Río de la Plata =

Spanish Navy protected cruiser of 1899–1931

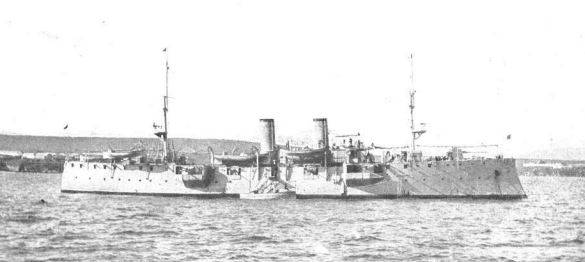
- Rio de la Plata, c. 1906.

History

Spain
- Name: Rio de la Plata
- Namesake: Río de la Plata
- Ordered: 1896 (authorized)
- Builder: Forges et Chantiers de la Méditerranée, Le Havre, France
- Cost: 3,650,000 pesetas
- Laid down: 1896
- Launched: 17 September 1898
- Commissioned: 1 August 1899
- Decommissioned: June 1931
- Fate: Scrapped 1932

General characteristics
- Type: Protected cruiser
- Displacement: 1,950 tons
- Length: 76.3 metres (250 ft 4 in)
- Beam: 10.8 metres (35 ft 5 in)
- Draft: 4.7 metres (15 ft 5 in)
- Depth: 7.1 metres (23 ft 4 in)
- Installed power: 3,837 hp (2,861 kW) (normal); 6,000 hp (4,474 kW) (forced draft)
- Propulsion: Two triple expansion steam engines, Normand-Sigaudy boilers, two screws
- Speed: 19 to 20 knots (35 to 37 km/h; 22 to 23 mph)
- Complement: 210
- Armament: 2 x 140 mm (5.5 in) Schneider-Canet guns or 150 mm (5.9 in) guns (see text); 4 x 105 mm (4.1 in) Krupp quick-firing guns; 6 x 57 mm (2.2 in) Nordenfeldt quick-firing guns; 4 x 37 mm (1.5 in) Nordenfeldt revolvers; 4 x machine guns; 2 x torpedo tubes
- Armour: 10–20 mm (0.4–0.8 in) (main deck)

Río de la Plata was a protected cruiser in commission in the Spanish Navy from 1899 to 1931. She was named for the Río de la Plata, also known as the River Plate, in South America. She spent most of her active career on maneuvers and ceremonial duties, in addition to occasional responses to events in Morocco. She was immobilized as an accommodation and training hulk in 1921.

== Characteristics ==
Río de la Plata was 76.3 metres (250 ft 4 in) long, with a beam of 10.8 metres (35 ft 5 in), a draught of 4.7 metres (15 ft 5 in), and a depth of 7.1 metres (23 ft 4 in). She displaced 1,950 tons. She had Normand-Sigaudy boilers and two triple expansion steam engines rated at 3,837 horsepower (2,861 kW) that drove two screws. Her maximum speed was 19 to 20 knots (35 to 37 kilometres per hour; 22 to 23 miles per hour). She has two funnels and could carry 376 tons of coal, giving her a range of 2,400 nautical miles (4,400 km; 2,800 mi) at an economical cruising speed.

Río de la Plata′s armament consisted of either two 150 mm (5.9 in) or two 140 mm (5.5 in) Schneider-Canet guns (according to different sources), one forward and one aft, and four 105 mm (4.1 in) Krupp quick-firing guns, six 57 mm (2.2 in) Nordenfeldt quick-firing guns, four 37 mm (1.5 in) Nordenfeldt revolvers, and four machine guns.

Río de la Plata had a steel hull and an armored deck. Her deck armor was steel and ranged from 20 to 10 millimetres (0.8 to 0.4 in) in thickness. Due to the lessons the Spanish Navy had learned in 1898 from its defeats during the Spanish-American War in the Battle of Manila Bay and the Battle of Santiago de Cuba all timber was removed from her topsides and the two torpedo tubes included in her original design were deleted.

== Construction and commissioning ==
The Spanish government authorized Río de la Plata′s construction in 1896, and she was laid down that year at Forges et Chantiers de la Méditerranée in Le Havre, France. She received her name by royal decree on 12 July 1897 and was launched on 17 September 1898. She was delivered to the Spanish Navy on 1 August 1899. Spanish emigrants residing in Argentina and Uruguay paid her construction cost of 3,650,000 pesetas.

The Spanish Navy planned to construct a sister ship of Río de la Plata named Puerto Rico, and in January 1898 contracted with the Arsenal de La Carraca in San Fernando, Spain, to build her. The ship was renamed General Liniers on 12 April 1899, but her construction halted soon afterward. Her construction was cancelled on 21 August 1903 and the incomplete General Liniers was scrapped on the slipway.

== Service history ==
=== 1899–1905 ===
Upon commissioning, Río de la Plata was assigned to the Training Squadron, under the overall command of Contralmirante (Counter Admiral) Manuel de la Cámara y Livermoore. By mid-August 1899 she was with the squadron at Ferrol, Spain, taking on coal, provisions, and fresh water. A few days later, she and the rest of the squadron got underway for San Sebastián, Spain, where King Alfonso XIII and Queen Regent Maria Christina were in residence.

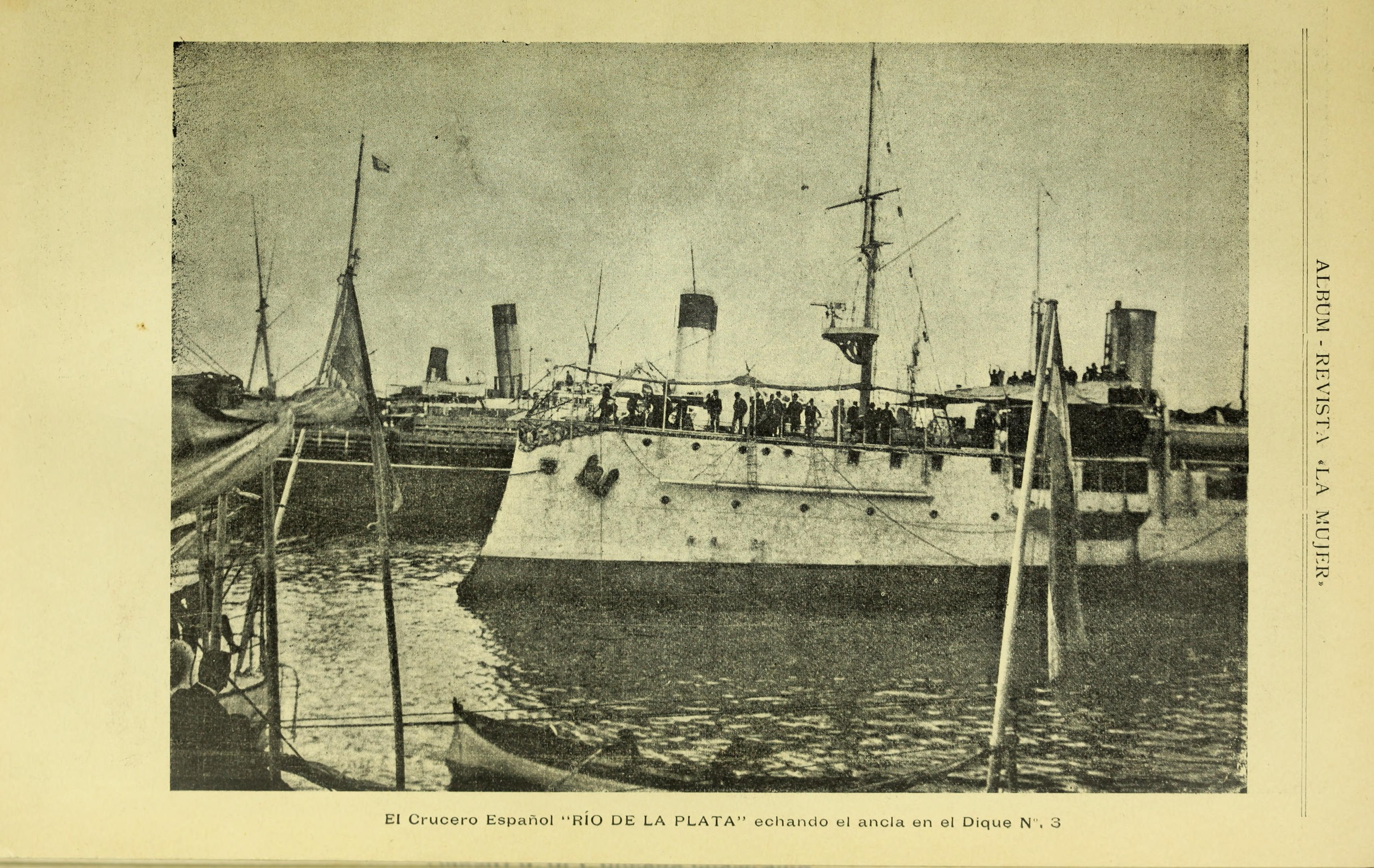
Río de la Plata (foreground) visiting Buenos Aires, Argentina, in 1900.

Río de la Plata made a voyage to South America in 1900, arriving first at Montevideo, Uruguay, on 13 February 1900. She remained there for about 15 days. She then visited Buenos Aires, Argentina, in March 1900, where she received a battle flag inscribed with To glorious Spain — The Argentine and Uruguayan ladies from the ladies of Buenos Aires, who had embroidered it for her. She then got underway from the Río de la Plata and headed around the southern tip of South America and into the Pacific Ocean where she made a representational voyage to show the flag and strengthen Spanish relations with Latin American countries there, especially Chile and Peru.

A decree of the Ministry of the Navy issued on 18 May 1900 described the technical situation of the Spanish Navy's ships and directed the decommissioning of 25 vessels deemed ineffective. It also stated: "The Río de la Plata and the Extremadura, as cruisers lacking broadside and artillery protection, have no other application than commissioned service in peacetime; for if employed in wartime, even only in the pursuit of enemy merchant ships, they would soon be captured or destroyed by armored and protected cruisers of greater speed than the 19 or 20 knots they can achieve, and could only perform, in some imperfect way, the role of dispatch vessels in coastal defense and under the protection of fortified points."

Río de la Plata arrived at Mahón on Menorca in the Balearic Islands in the Mediterranean Sea on the morning of 19 April 1902. After conducting gunnery exercises in those waters, she got underway from Mahón on 25 April and proceeded to Palma de Mallorca on Mallorca in the Balearics. Late in 1903, she visited the United States to represent Spain at the centennial celebration of the Louisiana Purchase, held at New Orleans, Louisiana, from 18 to 20 December 1903. The French Navy protected cruiser Jurien de la Gravière and three United States Navy vessels — the protected cruiser USS Minneapolis, the training ship USS Yankee, and the gunboat USS Topeka — joined her for the event.

In April 1904, Río de la Plata, the armored cruiser Cardenal Cisneros, and the protected cruiser Lepanto departed Cádiz, Spain, escorting the royal yacht Giralda, upon which King Alfonso XIII was embarked for a visit to the Balearic Islands. The ships stopped first at Mahón, then arrived on the afternoon of 21 April 1904 at Palma de Mallorca, where they rendezvoused with the coastal defense ship Numancia and a British Royal Navy squadron under the command of Vice-Admiral Charles Beresford that had arrived from Gibraltar. On the morning of 25 April Giralda and her escorts arrived at Ibiza, then set course for the Chafarinas Islands in the Alboran Sea in the western Mediterranean, which they reached on 26 April. On 27 April, the Spanish squadron departed for Málaga, Spain. Getting back underway from Málaga on 1 May 1904, the ships called at Melilla on the coast of North Africa. The king and his escorting ships then stopped at Chafarinas and Ceuta before ending the voyage at Cádiz.

On 7 May 1904 Río de la Plata was part of a squadron — which also included the armored cruiser Princesa de Asturias, the protected cruiser Extremadura, the unprotected cruiser Infanta Isabel (with the captain general of the Department of Cádiz and other officials embarked), and the destroyer Destructor — that escorted Alfonso XIII as he traveled aboard Giralda to visit the Compañía Transatlántica Española at Cádiz. Alfonso XIII departed Cádiz that afternoon for a voyage to Huelva.

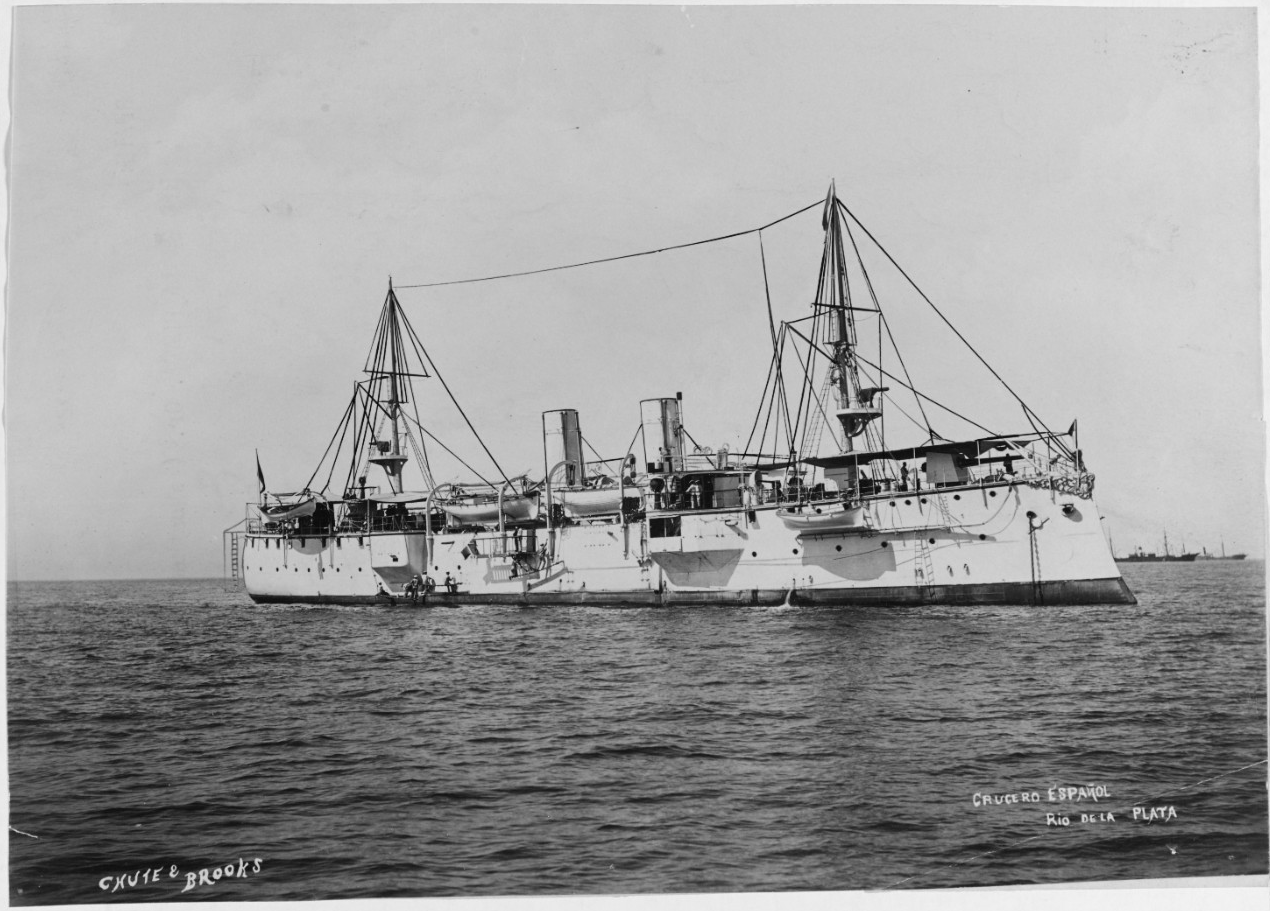
Río de la Plata's rigging, funnels, and a few other lines have been heavily retouched in this undated photograph.

Between late September and mid-October 1904, Río de la Plata carried out maneuvers with the battleship Pelayo, the destroyer Audaz, and the gunboat Álvaro de Bazán in the Cantabrian Sea off the north coast of Spain. The ships then proceeded to the waters off Galicia, where they conducted more maneuvers with the Training Squadron during the first week of November 1904.

On 13 January 1905, the Training Squadron — Río de la Plata, Pelayo, Cardenal Cisneros, Infanta Isabel, the armored cruisers Emperador Carlos V and Princesa de Asturias, and the protected cruiser Extremadura — assembled at Cádiz to receive the Duke and Duchess of Connaught and Strathearn, Prince Arthur and Princess Louise Margaret, as they arrived there aboard the Royal Navy armoured cruiser HMS Essex. From 5 to 25 February 1905, the squadron visited Santa Cruz de Tenerife on Tenerife in the Canary Islands. then returned to Cádiz. On 25 March 1905, the squadron anchored at Vigo, Spain.

Río de la Plata conducted maneuvers with the Training Squadron in the waters off Galicia at the beginning of October 1905, then proceeded to Muros, Spain. After Cardenal Cisneros and Princesa de Asturias joined Río de la Plata, Extremadura, and the gunboat Marqués de la Victoria at Muros on 24 October 1905, the five ships conducted more maneuvers under Training Squadron command. After the maneuvers concluded on 27 October, the ships again called at Muros. The squadron then parted company with Cardenal Cisneros, and the rest of the ships proceeded to Vigo and then to Cádiz. Río de la Plata then was among Training Squadron ships that moved to the Mediterranean, where they visited Mahón and other ports. At the beginning of December 1905, Río de la Plata entered the Arsenal de Cartagena at Cartagena, Spain, to have her hull cleaned.

=== 1906–1931 ===
During the Algeciras Conference — held at Algeciras, Spain, from 16 January to 7 April 1906 — the Spanish Navy placed Río de la Plata at the disposal of Don Juan Manuel Sánchez y Gutiérrez de Castro, jure uxoris Duke of Almodóvar del Río, Grandee of Spain, who was serving both as Minister of State and Spain's co-representative at the conference. Under his direction, she made several crossings of the Strait of Gibraltar to transport dignitaries to and from the conference.

Río de la Plata departed Cartagena on 16 March 1906 in company with Pelayo, Princesa de Asturias, and Emperador Carlos V and steamed to Cádiz, where other ships of the Training Squadron joined them. On 23 March 1906 the Training Squadron got underway from Cádiz in two divisions — one consisting of Princesa de Asturias, Emperador Carlos V, and the destroyer Osado and the other of Pelayo, Río de la Plata, and Extremadura. The squadron rendezvoused with Giralda and the Compañía Transatlántica Española passenger steamer Alfonso XII, the latter with the Spanish royal family and Minister of the Navy Víctor María Concas Palau aboard. They then escorted King Alfonso XIII on his visit to the Canary Islands, arriving at Tenerife on 26 March, at Las Palmas on 30 March, at Santa Cruz de la Palma on 3 April, and at Hierro Island on 4 April 1906. Alfonso XIII and the squadron returned to Cádiz on 7 April 1906.

In May 1906, the Training Squadron moved to the Mediterranean, where it remained for several months. On 2 November 1906 Pelayo, Emperador Carlos V, Princesa de Asturias, and the gunboat Doña María de Molina arrived from Cádiz at Málaga, where they rendezvoused with Río de la Plata, Extremadura, and Osado. The ships were at Málaga for the visit there of King Alfonso XIII and Queen Victoria Eugenie on 3 November and Alfonso XIII paid a visit to the squadron. In response to events in Morocco, the squadron deployed to Tangier in December 1906 along with other Spanish and French Navy ships.

In June 1907, the Training Squadron proceeded from the Mediterranean to the Vigo estuary to conduct maneuvers. In late June 1907, Rio de la Plata, Extremadura, and Princesa de Asturias formed a division that engaged in mock combat off Galicia with a division made up of Pelayo, Osado, and the destroyer Proserpina.

On 12 August 1907, the ocean liner Ciudad de Cádiz anchored at Ceuta on the coast of North Africa, getting back underway that night with a Spanish Army force of 400 soldiers and 150 horses aboard. At 16:00 on 13 August, she rendezvoused with Río de la Plata, Álvaro de Bazán, and three French Navy warships (the armored cruisers Condé and Gloire and the protected cruiser Galilée). The Spanish Army force landed at Casablanca in Morocco, and the Spanish ships supported the landing and the Spanish troops' subsequent actions against the Moroccans by bombarding enemy positions.

At the end of 1909, Río de la Plata entered the Arsenal de La Carraca at San Fernando, Spain, for a refit. After returning to active service, she got underway for the coast of North Africa, where she called at Melilla, Ceuta, and Tangier. In 1911, as part of the Training Squadron, she escorted King Alfonso XIII during his visit to North Africa and took part in the Spanish occupation of Larache, Morocco.

Late in April 1911, a French intervention in Morocco took place, leading to the Agadir Crisis between France and the German Empire, which began in July 1911. Anticipating a crisis when the French intervened, the Spanish Ministry of the Navy ordered the Training Squadron to concentrate at Cádiz, and Río de la Plata, Emperador Carlos V, Princesa de Asturias, Extremadura, Infanta Isabel, Audaz, Álvaro de Bazán, Doña María de Molina, the armored cruiser Cataluña, the protected cruiser Reina Regente, the destroyer Terror, and the transport Almirante Lobo gathered there along with a large number of Spanish Marine Infantry troops. The force conducted various amphibious landing exercises in the following days. On 5 May 1911, Río de la Plata and Princesa de Asturias got underway for Las Palmas on Gran Canaria in the Canary Islands. The Dutch newspaper Nieuwsblad van het Noorden reported from Ferrol in its 23 August 1911 edition that Río de la Plata had received orders to depart immediately for Cádiz carrying war stores, but the crisis came to an end in November 1911 without the need for a Spanish military intervention

In October 1913, Río de la Plata, Pelayo, Emperador Carlos V, Princesa de Asturias, Extremadura, Reina Regente, Audaz, Osado, Proserpina, and the dreadnought battleship España were at Cartagena during a meeting there between King Alfonso XIII and President of France Raymond Poincaré aboard the royal yacht Giralda.

Spain remained neutral during World War I (1914–1918). Río de la Plata only occasionally left Moroccan waters during the war years, carrying out various operations along the North African coast. By that time she had been modified to lay mines: The Dutch newspaper Rotterdamsch Nieuwsblad in its 1 May 1915 edition reported that she had been outfitted with minelaying equipment and carried 38 British-made mines.

Obsolete and worn out by 1921, Río de la Plata — along with the destroyer Audaz and the launches H-1, H-2, H-3, H-4, and H-5 — was assigned to the Spanish Navy's aviation force, the Aeronáutica Naval. She was towed to Barcelona, Spain, that year and anchored opposite the seaplane base there. She remained there for the rest of her career, serving as an immobile accommodation and training hulk for personnel of the Spanish naval aviation service.

== Disposal ==
The Kingdom of Spain fell and the Second Spanish Republic was proclaimed on 14 April 1931, and a few weeks later Río de la Plata was decommissioned at Cartagena in June 1931. She was scrapped in 1932.
