= Giralda (1894) =

Yacht and Spanish Navy vessel

- Giralda during her service as the Spanish royal yacht. She is dressed overall.

History

United Kingdom
- Name: Giralda
- Namesake: The Giralda, the bell tower of Seville Cathedral
- Builder: Fairfield Shipbuilding and Engineering Company, Govan, Glasgow, Scotland, United Kingdom
- Yard number: 376
- Launched: 28 August 1894
- Completed: December 1894
- In service: December 1894
- Identification: Official number 104586
- Fate: Sold to Spanish Navy 28 March 1898

Spain
- Name: Giralda
- Namesake: Previous name retained
- Cost: £60,000 (2,250,000 pesetas)
- Acquired: 28 March 1898
- Commissioned: March or April 1898
- Decommissioned: 1934
- Fate: Sold 1940; Scrapped

General characteristics (as private yacht)
- Type: Steam yacht
- Tonnage: 1894: 1,241 GRT; 212 NRT; 1,508 tons (tm); 1897: 1,265 GRT; 178 NRT
- Length: 289 ft 0 in (88.09 m) (registered length)
- Beam: 35 ft 1 in (10.69 m)
- Depth: 18 ft 0 in (5.49 m)
- Installed power: 8,500 shp (6,338 kW); 7,223 ihp (5,386 kW); 900 nhp (671 kW)
- Propulsion: Two 4-cylinder triple-expansion steam engines, five cylindrical boilers, two shafts, 436 long tons (443 tonnes) coal
- Speed: 20.9 knots (38.7 km/h; 24.1 mph) (trials)
- Complement: 105
- Notes: SOURCE:

General characteristics (Spanish Navy service)
- Type: Aviso
- Tonnage: 1,508 GRT
- Displacement: 1,609 tons (1,635 tonnes)
- Length: 311 ft 8 in (95.00 m) (loa); 272 ft 4 in (83.01 m) (waterline)
- Beam: 35 ft 1 in (10.69 m)
- Depth: 19 ft 0 in (5.79 m)
- Installed power: 8,500 shp (6,338 kW)
- Propulsion: Two 4-cylinder triple-expansion steam engines, two shafts, 436 long tons (443 tonnes) coal
- Speed: 20.9 knots (38.7 km/h; 24.1 mph) (trials)
- Range: 6,000 nmi (11,000 km; 6,900 mi) at 12 knots (22 km/h; 14 mph); 3,500 nmi (6,500 km; 4,000 mi) at 15 knots (28 km/h; 17 mph)
- Complement: 105
- Armament: 1898: 2 × 3 pdr (47 mm) Hotchkiss quick-firing guns; 2 × 8 mm Gardner machine guns; c. 1900: 4 × Nordenfelt 6 pdr (57 mm) quick-firing guns; Later: 2 × Nordenfelt 6 pdr (57 mm) quick-firing guns

Giralda was a steamship built as a private yacht in 1894. In 1898, the government of Spain acquired her. She subsequently was in commission in the Spanish Navy from 1898 to 1934, seeing service as a dispatch vessel, as the royal yacht of Queen Regent Maria Christina and King Alfonso XIII, as a training ship, and as a hydrographic survey ship. She spent her final years as a ship of the Spanish Republican Navy after the proclamation of the Second Spanish Republic in 1931.

== Design ==
Giralda as a private yacht off Naples, Italy. As a Royal Yacht Squadron vessel, she flies the same White Ensign as ships of the Royal Navy. (1896 painting The Royal Yacht Squadron Steam Yacht Giralda in Neapolitan Waters by Antonio de Simone)

Giralda was a 1,508-gross register ton steel-hulled steamship rigged as a three-masted schooner. At the time of her construction, she was one of the largest yachts ever built for a private individual, with a length overall of 95 metres (311 ft 8 in), a waterline length of 83 metres (272 ft 4 in), a beam of 10.70 metres (35 ft 1 in), and a depth of hull of 5.80 metres (19 ft 0 in).

Giralda had two triple-expansion engines, each with four crankshafts. Each engine had four cylinders, the first with a diameter of 0.625 metres (24.61 inches), the second with a diameter of 1 metre (39.37 inches), and the last two with a diameter of 1.13 metres (44.49 inches), with a stroke of 685 millimetres (26.97 inches). Her five cylindrical steel boilers were rated at 11.5 kg/cm^{2} (164 psi). Her coal bunkers had a capacity of 496 long tons (504 tonnes) and surrounded her machinery, providing it with protection. Her engines produced 8,500 shaft horsepower (6,338 kilowatts), and she reached a speed of 20.9 knots (38.7 km/h; 24.1 mph) during sea trials.

Above deck, Giralda had a forecastle, a 50-meter (164-foot) long central house amidships, and a cabin aft that housed her engine room. The central house included a waiting room, a saloon, a dining room, and a smoking room. A gallery to starboard connected these rooms. Her cabins were below deck, 2.90 metres (9 ft 6 in) above the cabin sole. Forward of the boiler room she had four large cabins, accessed by a staircase leading down from a room in the central house aft of the smoking room. The owner's cabin and adjoining rooms were aft of the engine room and were decorated with mahogany joinery and silk upholstery. Large skylights and frosted-glass rooflights allowed sunlight into the rooms, and all of the ship's compartments had electric lighting. Her hull was divided into watertight compartments.

== Construction ==
Giralda was constructed by the Fairfield Shipbuilding and Engineering Company at Govan in Glasgow, Scotland, in the United Kingdom for the British statesman and sportsman Hugh McCalmont. She was laid down with the shipyard number 376 and launched on 28 August 1894. She conducted her sea trials on 5 November 1894, and was registered in Glasgow on 9 November. McCalmont took delivery of her upon her completion in December 1894. Her official number was 104586.

== Service history ==
A model of Giralda

=== Private yacht ===
Giralda as a private steam yacht, seen departing Messina, Sicily, in 1895

Following her delivery to McCalmont, Giralda became part of the Royal Yacht Squadron and participated in several regattas. At the time she entered service, she was the fastest private yacht in the world. She broke the speed record for a crossing from England to the Mediterranean Sea, steaming the 1,000 nautical miles (1,900 km; 1,200 mi) from Dartmouth to Gibraltar in 61 hours.

In 1895 the Japanese government tried to buy Giralda, intending to operate her as a fast despatch vessel in the Imperial Japanese Navy. The sale did not go through.

In early 1898, with war between Spain and the United States imminent, Giralda was offered for sale to the United States government. The United States had no interest in buying her. She then was offered to the Kingdom of Spain, which purchased her on 28 March 1898 for 60,000 pounds sterling, equivalent at the time to US$300,000 or 2,250,000 Spanish pesetas.

=== Spanish Navy ===
==== Spanish-American War ====
Giralda completed her delivery voyage to Spain with her arrival on 27 March 1898 at Barcelona, where she began conversion for naval service as an aviso. Her commanding officer, Capitán de fragata (Frigate Captain) Rafael Rodríguez de Vera, was appointed on 1 April. After the installation of her armament and loading of coal, she departed Barcelona on 20 April 1898 bound for Cádiz.

The Spanish-American War began on 25 April 1898, when the United States declared war on Spain, stipulating that the declaration was retroactive to 21 April, when it had begun to commit acts of war, such as blockading Cuba and seizing Spanish merchant ships. The Spanish Navy's 1st Squadron, under Contralmirante (Counter Admiral) Pascual Cervera y Topete, deployed to the Caribbean Sea, where it became trapped at Santiago de Cuba on the southeastern coast of Cuba on 27 May 1898 by the ships of the United States Navy's Flying Squadron, reinforced on 1 June by the ships of the North Atlantic Squadron.

To relieve the pressure on Cervera's squadron, the Spanish Navy began to plan a counterattack by ships of the 2nd Squadron, still in Spanish home waters under the command of Contralmirante (Counter Admiral) Manuel de la Cámara y Livermoore. The plan called for Giralda to operate as part of the 2nd Squadron's 1st Division. Under Cámara's direct command, the 1st Division — which also included the armored cruiser Emperador Carlos V and the auxiliary cruisers Meteoro, Patriota, and Rapido — was to make a transatlantic voyage to Bermuda, where it would receive further instructions. It then was to steam northward along the United States East Coast — pausing to bombard an American city along the way — to Halifax, Nova Scotia, Canada. After receiving additiional instructions there, the division was to steam to the Turks and Caicos Islands for operations in the Caribbean.

In the end, these plans were cancelled, and Giralda did not take part in an abortive attempt by Cámara's squadron to steam to the Philippines in June-July 1898. Giralda thus remained in Spanish home waters throughout the war, seeing no combat. The Spanish Navy suffered heavy losses during the war, which ended in August 1898 and resulted in the Spanish Empire losing the Philippines and Guam in the Spanish East Indies and Cuba and Puerto Rico in the Caribbean.

==== Repatriation of Columbus's remains ====
In the Spanish-American War's aftermath, the unprotected cruiser Conde de Venadito departed Cuba carrying the remains of Christopher Columbus. She arrived at Cádiz at approximately 10:20 on 16 January 1899 and immediately transferred Columbus's casket and verification paperwork to Giralda, a transfer managed by Cristóbal Colón, 14th Duke of Veragua — Columbus's direct descendant — who delayed all public ceremony for the transfer until the arrival of the remains at Seville. Giralda then steamed along the coast of Spain to Sanlúcar de Barrameda and from there up the Guadalquivir River to Seville, which she reached on 19 January 1899. As she arrived, she received a grand salute by the sirens of ships on the scene. In a public ceremony, Columbus's remains were brought ashore and transported to Seville Cathedral for burial.

==== Royal yacht ====
A decree by the Ministry of the Navy of 18 May 1900 outlined the technical situation of the Spanish Navy's ships and directed the decommissioning of 25 ships deemed ineffective. Regarding Giralda, the decree stated:

Giralda, due to its good condition and performance, although without any military value, and deficient in several respects as a dispatch vessel, is also useful for peacekeeping missions and international services to which the Navy may be justly obligated.

King Alfonso XIII at age 14 aboard Giralda on 30 August 1900.

Thus retained by the Spanish Navy, Giralda began service as Spain's royal yacht. Her first voyage in this capacity began on 16 August 1900, when Queen Regent Maria Christina, her children King Alfonso XIII, Maria de las Mercedes, and Maria Teresa, and Prime Minister Francisco Silvela boarded Giralda at San Sebastián to begin a cruise along the northern and Galician coasts of Spain. Maria Christina wanted to give the 14-year-old Alfonso XIII both his first experience of life at sea and direct exposure to the coastal communities of northern and northwestern Spain. Accompanied by the gunboat Vasco Núñez de Balboa and the aviso Urania, Giralda reached Bilbao on 16 August. As the cruise continued, the royal family arrived at Gijón on 18 August, Avilés on 20 August, A Coruña on 22 August, Muros, Villagarcía de Arosa, Marín, and Vigo on 28 August, Ferrol on 1 September, and Santander on 8 September before returning to San Sebastián on 10 September. Thereafter, such summer cruises by the royal family became commonplace, and a tour of duty aboard Giralda was considered a high honor for Spanish naval officers. As a junior officer, Manuel de Mendívil y Oliva, who would become a noted writer and the colonial governor of Spanish Guinea, served aboard Giralda early in her service as the royal yacht.

In 1901, a squadron under Cámara's command consisting of Emperador Carlos V, Urania, Vasco Núñez de Balboa, the battleship Pelayo, the coastal defense ships Numancia and Vitoria, the protected cruiser Río de la Plata, the destroyers Audaz, Osado, and Proserpina, the torpedo boats Habana, Halcón, and Orión, the gunboat Temerario, and the corvette Nautilus (serving as a training ship) was on hand to greet the royal family when it visited Ferrol aboard Giralda.

After the installation of a Branly-Popp radiotelegraphy system aboard her, Giralda put to sea from San Sebastián to test it with Alfonso XIII embarked on 8 October 1903. From 25 nautical miles (46 km; 29 mi) off San Sebastián, she established radiotelegraphic communications with a motor vehicle parked at the lighthouse on Mount Igueldo. It was the Spanish Navy's first test of a radiotelegraphy system at sea.

Kaiser Wilhelm II of Germany arrived at Vigo on the morning of 15 March 1904 aboard the Norddeutscher Lloyd liner König Albert, escorted by the Imperial German Navy armored cruiser SMS Prinz Heinrich. There to meet him were Giralda, Pelayo, Audaz, Urania, and Vasco Núñez de Balboa, all dressed overall for the occasion. At about the same time, Alfonso XIII arrived in Vigo by train and immediately went to the docks to greet the kaiser aboard König Albert. Alfonso XIII then embarked on Giralda, and in the afternoon Wilhelm II returned the visit, boarding Giralda. On 16 March, the kaiser returned to Giralda and had lunch aboard her with Alfonso XIII.

In April 1904, radiotelegraphy equipment manufactured by the German company Telefunken was installed experimentally aboard Giralda, Pelayo, and the protected cruiser Extremadura. The three ships subsequently experimented with the new technology in the Mediterranean Sea during the summer of 1904.

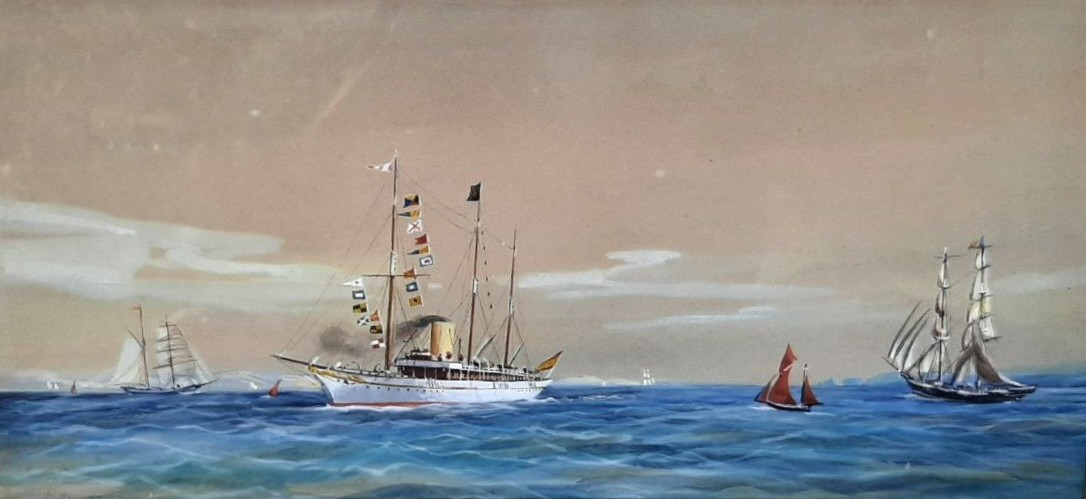
Marine Painting Depicting the Yacht Giralda and Sloops by Antonio de Caula y Concejo, c. 1900–1912.

In April 1904, Giralda departed Cádiz under escort by Río de la Plata, the armored cruiser Cardenal Cisneros, and the protected cruiser Lepanto to transport Alfonso XIII for a visit to the Balearic Islands. The ships stopped first at Mahón on Menorca, then arrived on the afternoon of 21 April 1904 at Palma de Mallorca on Mallorca, where they rendezvoused with Numancia and a British Royal Navy squadron under the command of Vice-admiral Charles Beresford that had arrived from Gibraltar. On the morning of 25 April Giralda and her escorts arrived at Ibiza, then set course for the Chafarinas Islands in the Alboran Sea in the western Mediterranean, which they reached on 26 April. On 27 April, the Spanish squadron departed for Málaga, Spain. As the king's tour continued, Giralda and the escorting ships got back underway from Málaga on 1 May 1904 and arrived at Melilla on the coast of North Africa on 2 May. On 3 May, the ships stopped between the islands of Congreso and Isabel II in the Chafarinas Islands, and the king disembarked in the royal barge to visit Isabel II Island. After he returned to Giralda, the ships steamed to Ceuta on the North African coast. The ships then proceeded to Cádiz, where the king visited the city. Aboard the destroyer Destructor, the king transferred back to Giralda in the harbor at Cádiz on 5 May and Princesa de Asturias, Extremadura, and Río de la Plata escorted Giralda across the Bay of Cádiz to Rota. From there, Giralda proceeded under escort by Destructor and the three cruisers to Huelva, which they reached on 6 April. After the king completed his visit to Huelva and boarded Giralda, the ships proceeded to the mouth of the Guadalquivir River near Sanlúcar de Barrameda. Leaving the cruisers anchored there, Destructor accompanied Giralda as she steamed up the Guadalquivir River to Seville, where the king disembarked on 8 May.

On the afternoon of 13 April 1905, Giralda got underway from Castellón with Alfonso XIII aboard escorted by Cardenal Cisneros and Numancia bound for Alicante, where the three ships arrived on the morning of 14 April. Alfonso XIII inaugurated the Club Náutico (Nautical Club) during his visit to Alicante. In June 1905, Alfonso XIII began a trip to France and the United Kingdom, departing aboard Giralda bound for Cherbourg, France, escorted by Cardenal Cisneros and the armored cruiser Princesa de Asturias. From Cherbourg, they headed to Portsmouth, England. After Alfonso XIII returned to Spain, the three ships remained at Portsmouth for a courtesy visit before heading back to Spain, which they reached with their arrival at Ferrol on 19 June.

Cardenal Cisneros, Princesa de Asturias, and Extremadura joined Giralda at San Sebastián on 13 July 1905. The ships attended an international regatta there. From mid-November 1905 until 18 May 1907, Alférez de navío (Ship-of-the-Line Ensign) Francisco Moreno Fernández, who later would become an almirante (admiral) under the Francoist regime, served aboard Giralda. Sometime in the next few years his brother Salvador Moreno Fernández, who under the Francoist government also would become an almirante (admiral) and twice serve as minister of the navy, also spent a tour of duty as a junior officer aboard Giralda.

Giralda anchored off Cowes, probably in 1906.

On 23 March 1906 the Training Squadron got underway from Cádiz in two divisions — one consisting of Princesa de Asturias, Emperador Carlos V, Osado and the other of Pelayo, Extremadura, and Río de la Plata. The squadron rendezvoused with Giralda and the Compañía Transatlántica Española passenger steamer Alfonso XII, the latter with the Spanish royal family and Minister of the Navy Víctor María Concas Palau aboard. They then escorted King Alfonso XIII on his visit to the Canary Islands, the first to the islands by a monarch, arriving at Tenerife on 26 March, at Las Palmas on 30 March, at Santa Cruz de la Palma on 3 April, and at Hierro Island on 4 April 1906. Alfonso XIII, Giralda, and the Training Squadron returned to Cádiz on 7 April 1906.

On 30 July 1906, again escorted by Princesa de Asturias, Giralda transported Alfonso XIII and Queen Consort Victoria Eugenie from San Sebastián to Cowes on the Isle of Wight. The ships called at Cowes from 1 to 13 August, when they departed for Southampton, where the king and queen boarded a train to Scotland. After their visit to Scotland, the king and queen embarked on Giralda at Southampton on 21 August, and she and Princesa de Asturias steamed from Southampton back to Cowes, where they stopped later on 21 August before continuing their homeward voyage. On 23 August, the ships returned to Spain, arriving at San Sebastián.

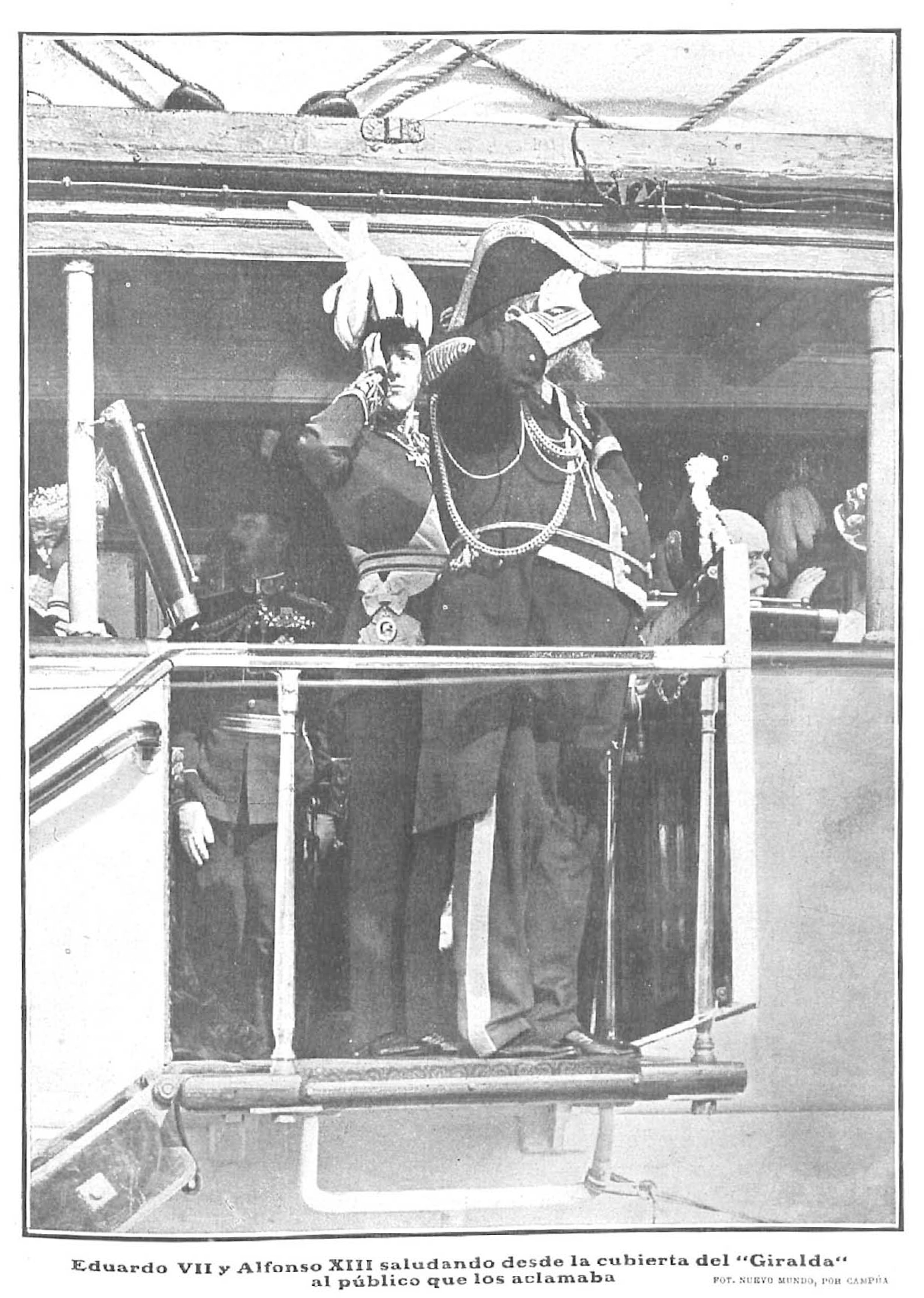
Alfonso XIII (left) and Edward VII wave to a cheering crowd from the deck of Giralda during Edward VII's official visit to Cartagena in April 1907, a prelude to the Cartagena Pact.

King Alfonso XIII in 1907, probably aboard Giralda.

On 8 April 1907, Giralda hosted a royal summit held afloat in the harbor off Cartagena between Alfonso XIII and King Edward VII of the United Kingdom. The summit, which lasted until 10 April, celebrated the Pact of Cartagena. It was held entirely in the harbor aboard ship to ensure Ewward VII's safety because of political instability in Spain at the time. Princesa de Asturias, Numancia, Extremadura, the protected cruisers Infanta Isabel and Lepanto, and the torpedo boats Acevedo and Ordóñez in addition to Giralda were in port for the event.

In July 1907, Giralda conveyed the Alfonso XIII and Victoria Eugenie to Santander under the escort by the gunboat ship, with the Captain General of the Department of Ferrol, the Marqués de Arellano Contralmirante (Counter Admiral) Antonio Perea y Orive, aboard Marqués de la Victoria for the occasion. On the afternoon of 30 August 1907, Giralda arrived at Bilbao with the Spanish royal family aboard. There to meet her with their crews formed up on deck were Pelayo, Emperador Carlos V, Princesa de Asturias, Osado, and Proserpina. The warships fired salutes as Giralda steamed into port.

At the request of Alfonso XIII, the Spanish Navy ordered four motor launches from the British shipbuilding firm John I. Thornycroft & Company, two for use aboard Giralda for ferrying people to and from the ship and two for the new armored cruiser Cataluña. The launches apparently were in service aboard Giralda by early 1908.

In August 1908, Alfonso XIII attended regattas held off Santander. He arrived in Bilbao aboard Giralda on 15 August and was met by a flotilla of sloops of the Real Sporting Club de Bilbao (Royal Sporting Club of Bilbao) and the steamer Elcano, aboard which were representatives of the Cortes Generales — Tomas Zubiría Ybarra and Juan Tomás Gandarias — and the local authorities. After the regattas, he left Santander aboard Giralda bound for San Sebastián under escort by the destroyer Terror.

On 22 July 1909, Alfonso XIII arrived at Ferrol aboard Giralda. The Spanish Navy's Training Squadron — including Princesa de Asturias, Emperador Carlos V, Audaz, Osado, and Terror — received him there.

Alfonso XIII visited Melilla on 8 January 1911, arriving aboard Giralda. Giralda′s escort included Princesa de Asturias, Extremadura, Río de la Plata, Numancia, Audaz, Terror, Cataluña, the gunboat Álvaro de Bazán, and the transport Almirante Lobo.

In June 1911, Giralda got underway from Santander with Alfonso XIII on board bound for England, escorted by the protected cruiser Reina Regente. In England, Alfonso XIII participated in the Cowes Week regatta before returning to Spain in August.

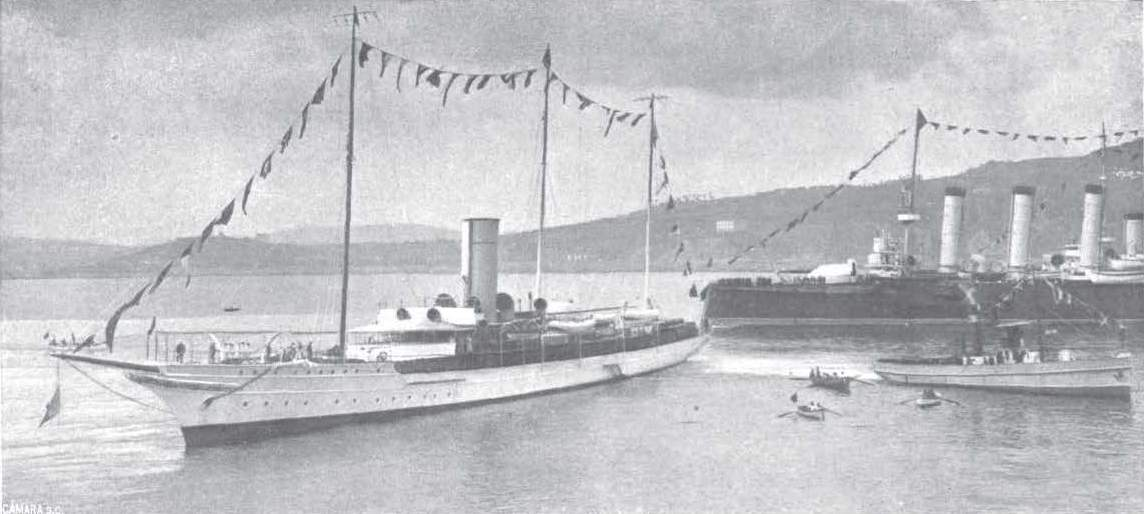
Giralda at Gijón in 1912. The armored cruiser Emperador Carlos V is at right. Both ships are dressed overall.

In 1912, Alfonso XIII resided aboard Giralda during the celebration of the centenary of the Spanish Constitution of 1812 at Cádiz.

In October 1913, Alfonso XIII and President of France Raymond Poincaré met aboard Giralda at Cartagena. Pelayo, Emperador Carlos V, Princesa de Asturias, Extremadura, Reina Regente, Río de la Plata, Audaz, Osado, Proserpina, and the dreadnought battleship España, were in the harbor to attend the meeting.

Alfonso XIII was aboard Giralda at Santander in the late summer of 1915 when the Spanish Navy's first two dreadnought battleships, Alfonso XIII and España, arrived there for a port call.

On 27 July 1917, Giralda rendezvoused off San Sebastián with the destroyers Bustamante and Villaamil and the torpedo boats T-2 and T-8 as Giralda began a voyage to Santander with members of the Spanish royal family aboard. The warships escorted Giralda to Santander, which they reached the same day.

==== Training and survey ship ====
Giralda′s service as a royal yacht ended in 1918 when she underwent modifications during a refit and became a training ship for Spanish Navy midshipmen. Subsequently, Fernando Abárzuza y Oliva, a future contralmirante (counter admiral) and Nationalist hero of the Spanish Civil War, served a tour of duty aboard Giralda. In 1920, Luis Carrero Blanco, a future almirante (admiral) and prime minister of Spain, trained aboard her as a midshipman.

Later in 1920, Giralda became a survey ship, thereafter conducting hydrographic surveys for the Spanish Navy along the coasts of Spain and North Africa. Subsequently, From 1920 to 1921, she was assigned to the Instituto Español de Oceanografía (IEO) — the Spanish Oceanographic Institute — to carry out expanded maritime and chemical survey campaigns under international framework agreements coordinated by the newly formed Mediterranean Science Commission (CIESM). During this work, Giralda systematically monitored the waters of the Atlantic Ocean, the Gulf of Cádiz, the Strait of Gibraltar, and the northern stretches of the western Mediterranean Sea. These operations launched the career of Jimena Quirós, Spain's first female oceanographer, who embarked aboard Giralda during 1921. Rafael Estrada y Arnaiz, a future almirante (admiral), served aboard Giralda around this time after passing the Spanish Navy's hydrography course. (Note: Several biographical summaries state that Estrada y Arnáiz participated in the Spanish Navy's "first tests" of wireless telegraphy (telegrafía sin hilos) aboard Giralda, placing this work between his 1912 promotion to teniente de navío (ship-of-the-line lieutenant) and his 1920 promotion to capitán de corbeta (corvette captain). However, the Spanish Navy's inaugural wireless trials aboard Giralda took place in 1904 — when Estrada y Arnáiz was a midshipman aboard Extremadura — and were directed by a commission that included his father, naval wireless pioneer Ramón Estrada y Catoira.)

In the summer of 1928, the seaplane carrier Dédalo arrived at Algeciras to work in conjunction with Giralda. A Spanish Navy Blackburn Swift torpedo bomber equipped with a vertical aerial camera embarked aboard Dédalo made 63 reconnaissance flights in support of Giralda′s hydrographic survey work.

Giralda spent her final years as a ship of the Spanish Republican Navy after the ouster of Alfonso XIII and the proclamation of the Second Spanish Republic in 1931. She continued service as a Spanish Navy survey ship until she was decommissioned in 1934.

== Disposal ==
Before the Spanish Civil War began in 1936, the Spanish Republican Navy made an unsuccessful attempt to sell Giralda for scrap. After the war concluded in 1939, the reconstituted Spanish Navy of Francoist Spain finally sold her to a shipbreaker in 1940. She was scrapped at Seville.

== Commemoration ==
Giralda was scheduled to be featured in the Barcos de Época (Vintage Ships) postage stamp series issued by the Spanish postal service, Correos, on 15 July 1994. However, due to an editorial error, the stamp instead depicted a completely different ship, the active Spanish Navy sail training yacht Giralda (A-76).
