= Osado =

Osado may refer to:

- Juan Antonio Osado (born 1989), Spanish professional footballer
- Spanish ship Osado, more than one Spanish Navy ship
