= Spanish cruiser Extremadura =

Spanish Navy protected cruiser of 1902–1931

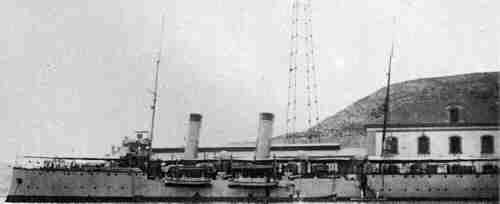

History

Spain
- Name: Extremadura
- Namesake: Extremadura, a region of Spain
- Ordered: 23 April 1898 (authorized)
- Awarded: 27 April 1898
- Builder: Constructora Naval Española, Cádiz, Spain
- Cost: almost 5,000,000 pesetas.
- Laid down: 23 February 1899
- Launched: 29 April 1900
- Completed: 1902
- Commissioned: 31 May 1902
- Decommissioned: 31 August 1931
- Fate: Scrapped 1932

General characteristics
- Type: Protected cruiser
- Displacement: 2,134 tons
- Length: 88 m (288 ft 9 in)
- Beam: 11 m (36 ft 1 in)
- Draft: 4.97 metres (16 ft 4 in)
- Depth: 6.55 metres (21 ft 6 in)
- Installed power: 7,000 hp (5,220 kW) (forced draft)
- Propulsion: 2 x vertical triple expansion steam engines, 8 x Thornycroft boilers; 432 tons coal
- Speed: 19 to 20 knots (35 to 37 km/h; 22 to 23 mph)
- Range: 4,320 nmi (8,000 km; 4,970 mi)
- Complement: 226
- Armament: 8 × Vickers 101 mm (4 in)/50 guns; 4 x Nordenfelt 57 mm (2.2 in) guns; 4 x machine guns; 1 x 7 mm Maxim gun (for steam launch); For amphibious landings: 4 x Maxim-Nordenfelt 37 mm (1.5 in) guns; 2 x 7.5 mm Vickers guns
- Armour: 2 x 25 mm (1 in) plates (belt)

Extremadura was a protected cruiser of the Spanish Navy in commission from 1902 to 1931. Her service period was almost entirely under the Kingdom of Spain, but her final few months in commission were under the Second Spanish Republic, which was proclaimed on 14 April 1931. She saw wartime service in the Second Melillan campaign in 1909 and the Rif War of 1921–1926. She was named for Extremadura, a region of Spain.

== Characteristics ==
Extremadura was a steel-hulled protected cruiser designed for colonial service in the Spanish Empire. She displaced 2,134 tons, was 88 metres (288 ft 9 in) long, and had a beam of 11 metres (36 ft 1 in), a depth of 6.55 metres (21 ft 6 in), and a draft of 4.97 metres (16 ft 4 in). Her hull was divided into 32 watertight compartments and she had an armored deck described by one source as made up of two plates, each 25 millimetres (0.98 in) thick, and by another as ranging from 20 to 25 millimetres (0.79 to 0.98 in) in thickness.

Extremadura had two vertical triple expansion steam engines and eight Thornycroft boilers, a powerplant that generated 7,000 horsepower (5,220 kW). She had a maximum speed of 19 to 20 knots (35 to 37 km/h; 22 to 23 mph) and could carry up to 432 tons of coal, giving her a range of 4,320 nautical miles (8,000 km; 4,970 mi).

Plans originally called for Extremadura′s armament to consist of Hontoria 140 mm (5.5 in)/35 and Krupp 105 mm (4.1 in)/32 guns. Instead, she was completed with an armament of eight Vickers 101 mm (4 in)/50 guns, four Nordenfelt 57 mm (2.2 in) guns, and four machine guns. Her steam launch mounted a 7 mm Maxim gun. She also carried four Maxim-Nordenfelt 37 mm (1.5 in) guns and two 7.5 mm Vickers guns for disembarkation in support of amphibious landings. She had a crew of 226 men.

== Construction and commissioning ==
Anticipating a war between Spain and the United States, the Spanish community in Mexico began a subscription drive in 1896 to raise money for the construction for the Spanish Navy of a cruiser to be named Colonia Española de Méjico ("Spanish Colony of Mexico," a reference to the Spanish community residing in Mexico) with a displacement of approximately 6,500 tons. Using this money, the Spanish government authorized a protected cruiser's construction on 23 April 1898 and on 27 April 1898 signed a contract for her construction with the Vea Murguía shipyard, which became the Constructora Naval Española (Spanish Naval Construction Company) in November 1898. In addition to Colonia Española de Méjico, the Spanish Navy considered naming the ship Méjico ("Mexico"), Patria ("Homeland"), and Puerto Rico before settling on Extremadura, naming her for the Extremadura region of Spain. The name honored the significant number of Spanish conquerors of, and emigrants to, the New World who had come from Extremadura.

Extremadura's keel was laid in Cádiz, Spain, on 23 February 1899. She was launched on 29 April 1900 — the first new ship launched for the Spanish Navy since the Spanish-American War in 1898. While she was under construction, a decree of the Ministry of the Navy on 18 May 1900 described the technical situation of the Spanish Navy's ships and directed the decommissioning of 25 vessels deemed ineffective. It also stated: "The Río de la Plata and the Extremadura, as cruisers lacking broadside and artillery protection, have no other application than commissioned service in peacetime; for if employed in wartime, even only in the pursuit of enemy merchant ships, they would soon be captured or destroyed by armored and protected cruisers of greater speed than the 19 or 20 knots they can achieve, and could only perform, in some imperfect way, the role of dispatch vessels in coastal defense and under the protection of fortified points." Extremadura nonetheless continued her fitting-out and ran her sea trials from February to April 1902. She was delivered to the Spanish Navy and commissioned on 31 May 1902. Her construction cost almost 5,000,000 pesetas.

== Service history ==
=== 1902–1909 ===
On 20 October 1902 Extremadura entered port at Mahón on Menorca in the Balearic Islands to take on coal, docking at the pier on Illa Pinto (Pinto Island). She then proceeded to the mainland of Spain, calling at Almería and Málaga.

A squadron that included Extremadura, the battleship Pelayo, the armored cruisers Cardenal Cisneros, Emperador Carlos V, and Princesa de Asturias, the coastal defense ship Numancia, and the destroyer Audaz got underway from the Balearic Islands on 13 June 1903 and proceeded to Cartagena, Spain, where it attended a visit to the city by King Alfonso XIII on 22 June.

In 1902, the Spanish government allocated funds for the testing of wireless telegraphy equipment at land stations and aboard Spanish Navy ships. In April 1904, Capitán de fragata (Frigate Captain) Ramón Estrada Catoyra — a future vicealmirante (vice admiral) — became the commanding officer of Extremadura. Interested in wireless telegraphy, he was a friend of the Spanish representative of the German company Telefunken, Julio Kocherthaler, who provided him with two wireless telegraphy sets free of charge for him to use and evaluate. The Spanish Navy installed one set in the watch officer's cabin aboard Extremadura and the other in the watch officer's cabin of Pelayo in April 1904. A third Telefunken set was installed aboard the royal yacht Giralda.

The three ships tested the equipment in the Mediterranean Sea during the summer of 1904, including an exchange between Pelayo and Extremadura at Mahón on 28 July 1904 in which Pelayo sent the first radiogram. During a port call at Barcelona, Spain, from 15 to 18 August 1904 Extremadura continued to test her wireless equipment, and on 16 August received a radiogram from Pelayo while Pelayo was at sea off Cabo Caballería (Cape Cavalry) on Menorca, a successful transmission over a distance of 240 kilometres (130 nmi; 149 mi) that confirmed the capability of two Spanish Navy ships to communicate at a distance via wireless telegraphy as well as the capability of successful transmissions between the Balearic Islands and Barcelona. However, this success and Estrada's enthusiasm for wireless telegraphy did not succeed in gaining the Spanish Ministry of the Navy's immediate support for acquisition of the technology by the Spanish Navy, and the Spanish Navy did not finally install wireless telegraphy sets aboard its ships until the years between 1911 and 1913.

On 26 October 1904, Extremadura was at Vigo, Spain, when the Imperial Russian Navy's Baltic Fleet made a port call there during its voyage from the Baltic Sea to reinforce Russian forces in East Asia during the Russo-Japanese War. Estrada went aboard the Russian flagship, the battleship Knyaz Suvorov, to greet the Russian commander, Vice Admiral Zinovy Rozhestvensky, and wish him good luck in his future operations against the Japanese.

On 13 January 1905, Extremadura, Pelayo, Cardenal Cisneros, Emperador Carlos V, Princesa de Asturias, the protected cruiser Río de la Plata, and the unprotected cruiser Infanta Isabel formed a squadron at Cádiz to receive the Duke and Duchess of Connaught and Strathearn, Prince Arthur and Princess Louise Margaret, as they arrived there aboard the Royal Navy armored cruiser HMS Essex. The Training Squadron — which included Emperador Carlos V (serving as its flagship), Cardenal Cisneros, Extremadura, and Princesa de Asturias — anchored at Vigo on the afternoon of 25 March 1905. In June 1905, Extremadura visited Kiel in the German Empire to attend Kiel Week. After Extremadura rendezvoused with Cardenal Cisneros and Princesa de Asturias off Cape Ortegal, the three ships arrived on 13 July 1905 at San Sebastián, Spain, where they joined Giralda for an international regatta. In August 1905 Extremadura visited England to participate in Cowes Week before proceeding into the Baltic Sea, where she called at Kronstadt in the Russian Empire to deliver a message from Alfonso XIII to Emperor Nicholas II of Russia.

Extremadura was part of the Training Squadron when the squadron rendezvoused at Cádiz in March 1906. On 23 March 1906 the Training Squadron got underway from Cádiz in two divisions — one consisting of Princesa de Asturias, Emperador Carlos V, and the destroyer Osado, and the other of Extremadura, Pelayo, and Río de la Plata. The squadron rendezvoused with Giralda and the Compañía Transatlántica Española passenger steamer Alfonso XII, the latter with the Spanish royal family and Minister of the Navy Víctor María Concas Palau aboard. They then escorted King Alfonso XIII on his visit to the Canary Islands, arriving at Tenerife on 26 March, at Las Palmas on 30 March, at Santa Cruz de la Palma on 3 April, and at Hierro Island on 4 April 1906. Alfonso XIII and the squadron returned to Cádiz on 7 April 1906.

Alfonso XIII and Queen Victoria Eugenie visited Cowes aboard Giralda in the summer of 1906, escorted by Princesa de Asturias and Extremadura, which had three of Alfonso XIII's small racing boats lashed to her deck. The three ships arrived at Cowes on 1 August 1906, calling there until 13 August.

On 2 November 1906 Pelayo, Emperador Carlos V, Princesa de Asturias, and the gunboat Doña María de Molina arrived from Cádiz at Málaga, where they rendezvoused with Extremadura, Río de la Plata, and Osado. The ships, all part of the Training Squadron, were at Málaga for the visit there of Alfonso XIII and Victoria Eugenie on 3 November and received a visit from the king.

Extremadura, Pelayo, Princesa de Asturias, Numancia, and the protected cruiser Lepanto attended a meeting between King Alfonso XIII and King Edward VII of the United Kingdom, which took place in Cartagena's harbor from 8 to 10 April 1907 along with a simultaneous meeting between Minister of the Navy José Ferrándiz y Niño and British First Sea Lord John Fisher. In late June 1907, Extremadura, Princesa de Asturias, and Rio de la Plata formed a division that engaged in mock combat off Galicia with a division made up of Pelayo, Osado, and the destroyer Proserpina. In September 1907 Extremadura anchored at Tangier, joining other Spanish ships there, and she arrived at San Fernando, Spain, on 8 October 1907 to bring aboard coal and provisions and undergo repairs at the Arsenal de La Carraca.

In February 1908, Extremadura and the gunboats Álvaro de Bazán, María de Molina, and Marqués de la Victoria formed a squadron which patrolled the waters of the Alboran Sea off the Chafarinas Islands in the Western Mediterranean to interdict the smuggling of weapons destined for Riffians in Morocco. She anchored at Larache in northwestern Morocco at the end of February. Subsequently, she conducted a number of operations in the Mediterranean before arriving at Tangier, where she disembarked Alfonso Merry del Val, who was to serve as the Spanish minister plenipotentiary there. In May 1909, Extremadura transported Alfonso XIII from Algeciras to Ceuta in North Africa.

Riffians killed a number of Spanish railway workers in Morocco on 9 July 1909, beginning the Second Melillan campaign. Extremadura was undergoing repairs at the Arsenal de la Carraca that day, but she arrived off North Africa on 19 July 1909 to take part in the conflict. She patrolled off the coast to prevent the smuggling of weapons to the Riffians and operated in support of Spanish Army troops. The conflict concluded in December 1909.

=== 1910–1931 ===
Late in April 1911, a French intervention in Morocco took place, leading to the Agadir Crisis between France and the German Empire, which began in July 1911. Anticipating a crisis when the French intervened, the Spanish Ministry of the Navy ordered the Training Squadron to concentrate at Cádiz, and Extremadura, Emperador Carlos V, Princesa de Asturias, Reina Regente, Río de la Plata, Infanta Isabel, Álvaro de Bazán, Doña María de Molina, Audaz, the armored cruiser Cataluña, and the transport Almirante Lobo gathered there along with a large number of Spanish Marine Infantry troops. The force conducted various amphibious landing exercises in the following days.

Extremadura operating as a submarine tender sometime between 1917 and 1920, with the submarine Cosme García (A-2) alongside her in the foreground and another A-class submarine astern of Cosme García.

In October 1913, Extremadura, Pelayo, Emperador Carlos V, Princesa de Asturias, Río de la Plata, Audaz, Osado, Proserpina, the dreadnought battleship España, and the protected cruiser Reina Regente were at Cartagena during a meeting there between King Alfonso XIII and President of France Raymond Poincaré aboard the royal yacht Giralda. On 26 December 1913 Extremadura, Pelayo, Proserpina, and the gunboat Lauria stood by a British ship that was aground on the coast of North Africa near Ceuta to deter Riffians from attacking the ship.

Spain remained neutral during World War I, which broke out in the summer of 1914. During the war, Extremadura spent time as a harbor ship in Mexico. She also escorted the Spanish Navy's first submarine, Isaac Peral (A-0), from Las Palmas on Gran Canaria in the Canary Islands to Cartagena, the last leg of Isaac Peral′s delivery voyage from the United States, on 26 April 1917, and in August 1917 she escorted three more new Spanish Navy submarines — Narciso Monturiol (A-1), Cosme García (A-2), and A-3 — from their construction yard at La Spezia, Italy, to Spain. Subsequently, she served as a submarine tender until 1920, when a submarine rescue ship purchased in the Netherlands, Kanguro, arrived in Spain and relieved her of these duties.

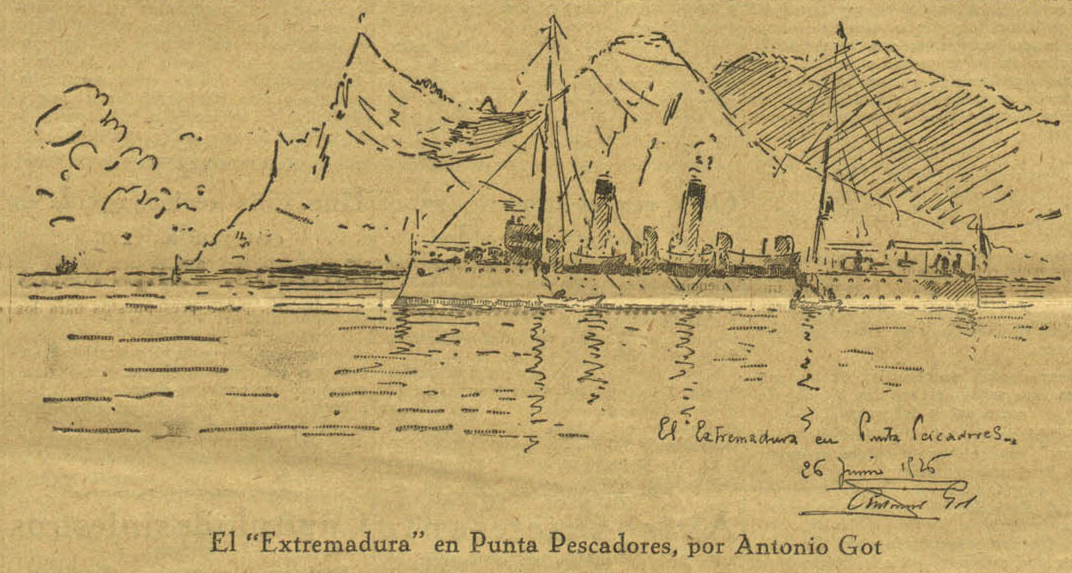
"El Extremadura en Punta Pescadores ("The Extremadura at Punta Pescadores"), illustration by Antonio Got published in La Nación on 10 September 1926.

Another war with the Riffians, the Rif War, broke out in Spanish Morocco in 1921. During the war, which lasted until 1926, Extremadura conducted surveillance, resupply, and shore bombardment operations. In September 1925, she took part in the Alhucemas landing, an amphibious operation at Al Hoceima — known to the Spanish as Alhucemas — on the Mediterranean coast of Spanish Morocco.

In September 1929, Extremadura rendezvoused at Cartagena with a squadron for general maneuvers in the Balearic Islands. The squadron began to leave Cartagena on the morning of 17 September 1929, and the maneuvers took place between 20 September and 1 October 1929 with Extremadura, the battleships Alfonso XIII and Jaime I, the seaplane carrier Dédalo, the light cruisers Blas de Lezo, Almirante Cervera, Méndez Núñez, and Príncipe Alfonso, the destroyers Alsedo, Lazaga, Sánchez Barcáiztegui, and Velasco, seven torpedo boats, the submarine division, and other smaller and auxiliary vessels participating.

== Disposal ==
Extremadura was decommissioned on 31 August 1931. She was scrapped in 1932.
