= Spanish cruiser Princesa de Asturias =

Spanish armored cruiser of 1903–1927

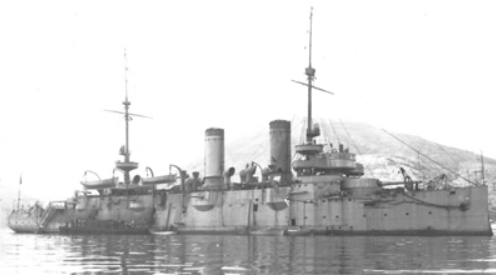

History

Spain
- Name: Princesa de Asturias
- Namesake: Mercedes, Princess of Asturias (1880–1904)
- Operator: Spanish Navy
- Ordered: 17 September 1888
- Builder: Arsenal de La Carraca, San Fernando, Spain
- Cost: 14,000,000 pesetas
- Laid down: 23 September 1889
- Launched: 17 October 1896
- Completed: 10 June 1903
- Commissioned: 10 June 1903
- Decommissioned: 28 December 1927
- Fate: Sold 1929; Scrapped
- Stricken: 1930
- Nickname(s): El Arrastrao ("The Dragged One"); El Espontáneo ("The Spontaneous One")

General characteristics
- Type: Armoured cruiser
- Displacement: 6,888 tons
- Length: 110.97 m (364 ft 1 in)
- Beam: 18.59 m (61 ft 0 in)
- Draught: 6.61 m (21 ft 8 in)
- Propulsion: Steam engines, 14,800 hp (11,036 kW), two shafts
- Speed: 20 knots (37 km/h; 23 mph)
- Complement: 542
- Armament: 2 × 9.4 in (24 cm) (2 × 1); 8 × 5.5 in (14 cm) (8 × 1); 8 × 57 mm (2.2 in)/42
- Armour: 11.88 in (30.2 cm) belt; 7.88 in (20.0 cm) barbette; 7.88 in (20.0 cm) conning tower; 3.88 in (9.9 cm) turret; 2.25 in (5.7 cm) deck

Princesa de Asturias was the lead ship of the Princesa de Asturias class of armored cruisers. She was in commission in the Spanish Navy from 1903 to 1927. She took part in the Second Melillan campaign in 1909, the Kert campaign of 1911–1912, and the Rif War of 1921–1926.

== Characteristics ==
Princesa de Asturias was 110.97 metres (364 ft 1 in) long and had a beam of 18.59 metres (61 ft 0 in), a draft of 6.61 metres (21 ft 8 in), and a displacement of 6,888 tons. She had reciprocating steam engines rated at 14,800 indicated horsepower (11,036 kW) driving two shafts, giving her a top speed of 20 knots (37 km/h; 23 mph). Her main armament consisted of two 9.4-inch (239 mm) guns mounted in single turrets. Her secondary armament consisted of eight 5.5-inch (140 mm) guns on single mounts.

The Princesa de Asturias-class ships in essence were modernized Infanta Maria Teresa-class cruisers with more modern and better-balanced armament, but like the Infanta Maria Teresa-class ships their armour coverage was not comprehensive, and the ships were poorly armoured by the standards of their time. Princesa de Asturias had belt armour of 11.88 inches (30.2 cm), conning tower and barbette armour of 7.88 inches (20.0 cm), 3.88-inch (9.9 cm) turret armour, and 2.25-inch (5.7 cm) deck armour.

== Construction and commissioning ==
Princesa de Asturias was ordered by a royal decree of 17 September 1888. She was laid down at the Arsenal de La Carraca at San Fernando, Spain, on 23 September 1889. The first attempt at launching her on 8 October 1896 failed when she moved only 2 metres (6 1/2 feet). A second attempt on 9 October also did not succeed, the ship moving only another 17 metres (56 ft) despite the efforts of tugs to pull her down the slipway. She lay with her stern in the water and the forward part of her hull still on the slipway, in danger of sustaining a broken keel, until 17 October 1896, when she suddenly began to move again of her own accord during a high tide that lifted her hull, entering the water with such force that she ran aground in mud on the opposite bank of the channel. Tugs had to pull her free. These events earned Princesa de Asturias two nicknames in the Spanish Navy: The launch attempt that failed despite the attempts of tugs to pull her down the slipway gave her the nickname El Arrastrao ("The Dragged One"), and her unplanned entry into the water eight days later gave her the nickname El Espontáneo ("The Spontaneous One").

While Princesa de Asturias was fitting out, she suffered damage in 1899 when a boom suspending a boiler above her broke during an attempt to lower the boiler into her hull for installation, and the boiler fell into her hull instead. She got underway from Cádiz on the morning of 2 July 1902 to conduct successful engine tests. She then entered dry dock to have her bottom cleaned. She began sea trials on 29 January 1903 and finally was delivered to the Spanish Navy on 10 June 1903. Her lengthy construction period of nearly 14 years meant that she was obsolete by the time she entered service. Her total construction cost was 14,000,000 pesetas.

== Service history ==
=== 1903–1905 ===
In June 1903, Princesa de Asturias departed Cádiz and rendezvoused with other Spanish Navy ships at Cartagena, Spain, for King Alfonso XIII's visit there. When the king visited on 22 June 1903, he signed papers submitted to him by Minister of the Navy Joaquín Sánchez de Toca Calvo which officially appointed Princesa de Asturias′s commanding officer to command of her. On 7 May 1904, Princesa de Asturias was part of a squadron — which also included the unprotected cruiser Infanta Isabel (with the captain general of the Department of Cádiz and other officials embarked), the protected cruisers Extremadura and Río de la Plata, and the destroyer Destructor — that escorted Alfonso XIII as he traveled aboard the yacht Giralda to visit the Compañía Transatlántica Española at Cádiz. Alfonso XIII departed Cádiz that afternoon for a voyage to Huelva.

Princesa de Asturias conducted naval exercises with the Training Squadron off Cantabria between the end of September and mid-October 1904. After completing the exercises, the squadron called at Ferrol, then proceeded to La Coruña, which it reached on the afternoon of 3 November 1904. The ships then made a voyage along the coast of Galicia, visiting Corcubión, Muros, Marín, and finally Vigo. The ships got underway from Vigo on 29 November 1904 and proceeded to the Cíes Islands, where they conducted gunnery exercises. Soon after that, the squadron visited Cádiz, where it received the Duke and Duchess of Connaught and Strathearn, Prince Arthur and Princess Louise Margaret, on 13 January 1905 after their arrival at Cádiz aboard the Royal Navy armoured cruiser HMS Essex. From 5 to 25 February 1905, the squadron visited Santa Cruz de Tenerife on Tenerife in the Canary Islands. It then returned to Spain, where part of it, including Princesa de Asturias, anchored at Vigo on the afternoon of 25 March 1905. Princesa de Asturias later moved to Ferrol to have her bottom cleaned.

Princesa de Asturias and her sister ship Cardenal Cisneros departed Ferrol on 27 May 1905 to escort King Alfonso XIII aboard Giralda. After a stop at Cherbourg, France, the ships arrived at Portsmouth, England, on 3 June 1905 for Alfonso XIII's visit to the United Kingdom. The ships got underway from Portsmouth on 16 June and arrived at Ferrol on the afternoon of 18 June 1905.

On 30 June 1905 the two armored cruisers got back underway from Ferrol to conduct naval exercises in the waters off Rías Baixas (Spanish: Rías Bajas). After completing them, they departed Marín at 06:00 on 13 July 1905 with Princesa de Asturias serving as the flagship of the division commander. After rendezvousing with Extremadura off Cape Ortegal, they arrived on 13 July at San Sebastián, where they joined Giralda for an international regatta. After its completion, the two armored cruisers got underway for Bilbao on 30 July. They returned to San Sebastián on the morning of 6 August during an unusually fierce summer storm.

During the first week of August 1905, Princesa de Asturias moved from Santander to Ferrol to prepare for a visit to the Netherlands. With her preparations complete, she departed Ferrol on 25 August 1905 and on 30 August reached the Netherlands, where she participated in a naval review. After returning to Spain, she spent much of October 1905 taking part in gunnery exercises with the Training Squadron off Galicia. In late October 1905, the squadron headed for the Mediterranean Sea, where it called at several ports before arriving at Mahón on Menorca in the Balearic Islands. At the beginning of December 1905 Princesa de Asturias entered dry dock at the Arsenal de Cartagena in Cartagena to have her bottom cleaned, and at the end of December 1905 she received a new commanding officer.

=== 1906–1909 ===
On 7 January 1906, Princesa de Asturias departed Cartagena and, after a stop at Cádiz, arrived at Ferrol in mid-January to pick up crews and supplies for the Mediterranean Squadron. After embarking 700 sailors and loading the supplies, she returned to the Mediterranean. She entered dry dock at Cartagena on 1 February 1906 to have her bottom cleaned again.

After returning to service with the Training Squadron, Princesa de Asturias departed Cartagena on 16 March 1906 in company with Río de la Plata, the battleship Pelayo, and the armored cruiser Emperador Carlos V and steamed to Cádiz, where other ships of the squadron joined them. On 23 March 1906 the Training Squadron got underway from Cádiz in two divisions — one consisting of Princesa de Asturias, Emperador Carlos V, and the destroyer Osado and the other of Pelayo, Río de la Plata, and the protected cruiser Extremadura. The squadron rendezvoused with Giralda and the Compañía Transatlántica Española passenger steamer Alfonso XII, the latter with the Spanish royal family and Minister of the Navy Víctor María Concas Palau aboard. They then escorted King Alfonso XIII on his visit to the Canary Islands, arriving at Tenerife on 26 March, at Las Palmas on 30 March, at Santa Cruz de la Palma on 3 April, and at Hierro Island on 4 April 1906. Alfonso XIII and the squadron returned to Cádiz on 7 April 1906.

On 7 May 1906, Princesa de Asturias, Pelayo, Emperador Carlos V, and Río de la Plata left Cadiz and, after stops at Ceuta and Málaga, arrived at Cartagena. At the end of June 1906, Princesa de Asturias and Río de la Plata departed Cartagena for a cruise along the Spanish coast. As part of the Training Squadron, Princesa de Asturias conducted naval exercises off Santa Pola, after which the squadron visited Alicante. The squadron got back underway on 4 July 1906 and proceeded to Barcelona.

Princesa de Asturias departed Barcelona on 11 July 1906 and, after stopping at Cádiz to coal, arrived at Ferrol. She got back underway from Ferrol on 23 July and on 25 July arrived at San Sebastián, where she rendezvoused with Giralda, which had King Alfonso XIII and Queen Victoria Eugenie aboard. The two ships moved on to Santander, from which they departed on 30 July bound for Cowes on the Isle of Wight in England. They arrived at Cowes in company with Extremadura — which had three of Alfonso XIII's small racing boats lashed to her deck — on 1 August 1906, calling there until 13 August, then proceeded to Southampton, where the king and queen disembarked for a visit to England and Scotland. The two ships departed Southampton and arrived at Cowes on 21 August and at San Sebastián on 23 August. Príncipe de Asturias parted company with Giralda there and rejoined the Training Squadron at Bilbao on 24 August 1906.

Princesa de Asturias was at Málaga on 3 November 1906, awaiting a visit to the city by King Alfonso XIII and Queen Victoria Eugenie. Due to unrest in Morocco, she departed Málaga in company with the French Navy armored cruiser Jeanne d'Arc bound for Tangier, where the two ships anchored on 6 November 1906. After confirming that Tangier was calm, Princesa de Asturias proceeded to Cádiz. After coaling and embarking Spanish Army troops, she headed back to Tangier in mid-December 1906, then returned to Cadiz in mid-January 1907.

In mid-February 1907, Minister of the Navy José Ferrándiz y Niño made a visit to Princesa de Asturias′s squadron during which he observed it while it carried out several exercises off Cádiz. He then embarked on Princesa de Asturias to visit the other Spanish naval departments. While at Ferrol on 25 March 1907, Princesa de Asturias received orders to proceed to Cartagena accompanied by Extremadura, Giralda, and the destroyer Proserpina. They were among a number of ships that attended a meeting between King Alfonso XIII and King Edward VII of the United Kingdom which took place in Cartagena's harbor from 8 to 10 April 1907.

Princesa de Asturias departed Cartagena in mid-April 1907 to conduct wireless telegraphy tests with her sister ship Cataluña using a new system invented by a Spanish telegraphist. She got underway on 23 April for Barcelona, where she repeated the tests with Emperador Carlos V. She rendezvoused at Barcelona with the Training Squadron, which left port on 7 May 1907 and headed for the Balearic Islands, where it conducted maneuvers. As part of a division that also included Extremadura, Río de la Plata, and two torpedo boats, Princesa de Asturias carried out additional maneuvers in the Mediterranean Sea in the first week of June 1907. The division arrived at Villagarcía de Arosa on 20 June and in the following days carried out maneuvers with Pelayo, Osado, and Proserpina off the coast of Galicia. The ships spent July and August 1907 operating in the Cantabrian Sea.

After receiving orders to move to the coast of Morocco, Princesa de Asturias and Pelayo departed Ferrol on 10 September 1907 bound for Cádiz carrying guns and military supplies. They entered the Arsenal de La Carraca when they arrived at Cádiz, and after leaving the arsenal made for Tangier, where they relieved Emperador Carlos V on station. On 17 January 1908, they put to sea from Cádiz to carry documents to the Spanish diplomats in Rabat. After the Spanish embassy staff boarded Princesa de Asturias at Rabat, she headed for Tangier. On 2 February 1908, she disembarked the diplomats at Cádiz. Meanwhile, the Lisbon Regicide — in which King Carlos I of Portugal and his son, Luís Filipe, Prince Royal of Portugal, were assassinated and Prince Manuel, the future King Manuel II of Portugal, was wounded — had taken place on 1 February 1908 in Lisbon, Portugal. Spending just enough time at Cádiz to take on coal, Princesa de Asturias headed for Lisbon, which she reached on 5 February. She remained there until 15 February 1908, when she departed to return to Cádiz.

Princesa de Asturias left Cádiz on 6 March 1908 to transport the new Spanish Minister Plenipotentiary, Alfonso Merry del Val, to Tangier. On 8 March she arrived at Barcelona, where King Alfonso XIII visited her. She remained in port there for several days with the rest of the Spanish fleet to receive a visit by an Austro-Hungarian Navy squadron of three battleships and two destroyers. On 4 April 1908, Princesa de Asturias left Tarragona and, after a stop at Valencia, arrived at Cartagena on 8 April to have her bottom cleaned. After the completion of that work, she departed on 18 April 1908 for Cádiz. She conducted gunnery exercises off Cádiz in June 1908, then put into port at Rota.

In late June 1908 Princesa de Asturias rendezvoused with other Spanish ships at Tangier. She left Tangier on 8 July to patrol the coast of Morocco, stopping on the afternoon of 9 July at Río Martin, where she anchored to await developments in case she had to land troops at Tétouan because of unrest there. She returned to Cádiz on 22 July 1908, and after coaling set off for Tangier. In August 1908, she got underway from Cádiz again for Larache in northwestern Morocco to relieve Cataluña there. In turn, Extremadura relieved her in mid-September 1908 and she returned to Cádiz.

On 16 October 1908, Princesa de Asturias departed Cádiz in company with Emperador Carlos V and the destroyer Audaz. They rendezvoused with Cataluña at Barcelona, where a French Navy squadron arrived on the morning of 21 October. After the two squadrons attended the stay of the King Alfonso XIII and Queen Victoria Eugenie at Barcelona, the Spanish squadron got back underway on 8 November, with Cataluña proceeding to Alicante and the rest of the ships arriving at Cartagena on 11 November 1908. On 5 December 1908, Princesa de Asturias and Audaz left Cartagena to transport material for the school of education to Cádiz. From there, Princesa de Asturias continued to Vigo and then to Ferrol, where she entered the dry dock at the end of December 1908 for repairs.

With her repairs complete, Princesa de Asturias left Ferrol on 2 January 1909 and called at Cádiz to load supplies for the relief of victims of the 28 December 1908 earthquake in Messina, Sicily. She arrived at Barcelona on 9 January, loaded more supplies, clothing, and other items there, and unloaded her cargo at Milazzo, Sicily, on 17 January. Members of her crew distributed the supplies in Messina. On 27 January, Princesa de Asturias herself arrived in Messina with the Spanish ambassador to the Kingdom of Italy on board. On 1 February, Princesa de Asturias arrived in Naples, leaving a few days later for Cartagena. She departed Cartagena on 18 February 1909 and, after a stop at Cádiz, proceeded to Ferrol.

=== Second Melillan campaign ===
In July 1909 the Second Melillan campaign, a conflict in northern Morocco between Spain and local Rifians, broke out in the vicinity of Melilla on the coast of North Africa. Princesa de Asturias rendezvoused at Barcelona with other Spanish Navy ships on 29 July 1909, forming a squadron that crossed the Strait of Gibraltar. Princesa de Asturias was at Barcelona again when Minister of the Navy Ferrándiz ordered her squadron — which also included Emperador Carlos V, Numancia, Osado, and the gunboat Vicente Yáñez Pinzón — to return to the area of operations, and it arrived at Melilla in mid-August 1909. On 18 August, it bombarded Rifian positions in the area of Nador and Ibarraben. On 19 August, the squadron split into two groups and began patrolling the Moroccan coast between Tangier and Cape Three Forks to prevent smuggling. On 29 August 1909 Princesa de Asturias suffered a mechanical breakdown at Chafarinas which forced her to discontinue her operations for temporary repairs. She anchored at Melilla on 4 September, then departed that afternoon for Cartagena, where she brought aboard food and other supplies for Spanish forces in Morocco. After delivering her cargo, she returned to Cartagena for permanent repairs.

Princesa de Asturias returned to Melilla on 1 October 1909. On 5 October she bombarded Rifian positions at Punta Negri and Boca del León. On 7 and 8 October and again on 10 October, her squadron — accompanied by the gunboat General Concha on 8 and 10 October — patrolled off Cape Three Forks, bombarding Rifian positions at Beni-bu-Gafar and Beni-Said. Princesa de Asturias called at Málaga to take on coal, water, and provisions, then returned to the North African coast. On 27 October 1909 she left Melilla and landed a company of African troops at Cape Three Forks to relieve the detachment there. In early November 1909, her squadron concentrated at Chafarinas to take shelter during bad weather. Princesa de Asturias concluded her participation in the campaign when she left Málaga on 26 November 1909 and headed for Cádiz.

=== 1910–1911 ===
Spanish concern over events in Portugal after King Manuel II of Portugal was overthrown in the 5 October 1910 revolution, bringing the Portuguese monarchy to an end and resulting in the establishment of the First Portuguese Republic, led Princesa de Asturias and Numancia to anchor at Lisbon that month. Princesa de Asturias returned to Cádiz on 11 November 1910. As 1911 began, Princesa de Asturias was at Melilla with her squadron, and King Alfonso XIII arrived aboard Giralda on 8 January. During another royal visit, the squadron conducted maneuvers in the presence of Alfonso XIII off Alicante in mid-February 1911.

=== Agadir Crisis and Kert campaign ===
In late April 1911 France intervened in Morocco, and the Spanish squadron moved to Cádiz in anticipation of incidents requiring a Spanish response. A sizeable deployment of French troops to Morocco in July 1911 began the Agadir Crisis. Meanwhile, the Kert campaign, a conflict between Spain and Rifians in Morocco, began in August 1911 and, after incidents began to occur in the vicinity of Melilla in September 1911, Princesa de Asturias was among Spanish Navy ships that deployed to Melilla in mid-October 1911. She and the armored cruiser Reina Regente bombarded positions near Trafats on 20 October. On 21 October she headed for Cartagena to take on coal and undergo repairs. After returning to North African waters she joined Pelayo and the gunboat Recalde in bombarding enemy positions near Al Hoceima on 6 November. She provided support services to Spanish Army forces in Morocco until the end of 1911, when she returned to Cartagena.

Princesa de Asturias and Recalde were stationed at Melilla on 8 January 1912. On 19 January, Princesa de Asturias went to the aid of Reina Regente, which had run aground on a sandbank at the mouth of the Kert River, then escorted her to Cartagena. On 27 February, Princesa de Asturias and Recalde exchanged fire with Rifian forces that attacked them from the left bank of the Kert River. Princesa de Asturias joined the gunboats Laya and Álvaro de Bazán in supporting Spanish Army operations at the mouth of the Kert River on 22 March 1912. The Kert campaign came to an end in May 1912.

=== 1912–1918 ===
Princesa de Asturias, Cataluña, and Emperador Carlos V took part in a naval review at Santander in July 1912 attended by King Alfonso XIII and Queen Victoria Eugenie. Princesa de Asturias towed the destroyer Terror, disabled by boiler problems, from Gijón to Ferrol, which the ships reached on 5 September 1912. On 20 September, Princesa de Asturias′s squadron departed for Cádiz.

From 13 to 16 March 1913, Princesa de Asturias, Cataluña, Emperador Carlos V, and Osado conducted gunnery exercises off Torre García, afterwards returning to Cádiz on 17 March. The ships departed Cádiz on 1 May 1913 and arrived at Ferrol on 2 May to attend the launching of the battleship Alfonso XIII, which took place on 7 May 1913. In mid-May 1913, Princesa de Asturias deployed to Constantinople to relieve Reina Regente, which had been stationed there as part of the Spanish response to the outbreak of the First Balkan War of 1912–1913.

World War I broke out in late July 1914. Spain remained neutral, and Princesa de Asturias spent the war in the Mediterranean Sea, mainly in the Balearic Islands and along the coast of Catalonia. On 2 October 1914, the Training Squadron, including Princesa de Asturias, gathered at Cartagena for the visit of the President of France, Raymond Poincaré, after which part of the squadron headed for the coast of Africa. On 19 October 1916, Spanish Marine Infantry personnel from Princesa de Asturias boarded the Greek steamer Andera Jerakis at Las Palmas in the Canary Islands, arresting 17 rebellious crew members. Shortly afterwards, she picked up 17 crew members of the Portuguese merchant ship Emilia, which an Imperial German Navy submarine had sunk.

=== Rif War ===
After World War I ended in November 1918, Princesa de Asturias patrolled the North African coast almost constantly, and during her final years of service she was based at Ceuta. The Rif War broke out between Spain and the Republic of the Rif in 1921, and the end of July 1921 Princesa de Asturias operated in support of the Spanish Army garrison at Sidi Dris. After Riffian forces captured the Spanish positions there, boats from Princesa de Asturias, Laya, and the gunboat Lauria picked up the Spanish troops and the ships bombarded the Rifians. On 25 August 1921, Princesa de Asturias bombarded Rifian positions near Punta Restinga, and on 9 September she bombarded the souks of El Arbaa and El Arkemán. She also joined the battleship España in bombarding Barraca Hill on 16 September 1921. She entered a dry dock in Matagorda, for careening at the end of 1924, but then returned to combat in the Rif War and served as flagship of the Spanish Navy's North African naval division during the Alhucemas landing at Al Hoceima in September 1925. The war ended in 1926.

== Final disposition ==
Princesa de Asturias was decommissioned by a Royal Order of 28 December 1927. She was sold at auction at Bilbao in 1929 for scrapping, but was not stricken from the naval register until 1930.
