= Jimena Quirós =

Spanish scientist

Jimena Quirós Fernández y Tello
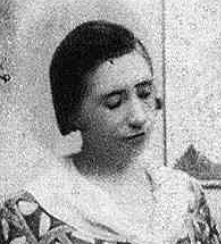
- Born: 5 December 1899; Almería, Spain
- Died: 1983 (aged 83–84); Madrid, Spain
- Education: Central University, predecessor of the Complutense University of Madrid University of Paris Columbia University
- Known for: First female oceanographer in Spain and political activist for women's rights.
- Scientific career
- Fields: Oceanography

Jimena Quirós Fernández y Tello (Almería, Spain 5 December 1899 – Madrid, Spain 1983) was a Spanish scientist considered the first female oceanographer in the country. She was the first female staff scientist of the Spanish Institute for Oceanography (IEO), a centre founded in 1914, dedicated to marine science research.

== Early life ==
Jimena Quirós Fernández y Tello was born in Almería on the 5th of December in 1899. She was the youngest daughter in a numerous family that frequently travelled due to the job of the father, José María Quirós Martín, a gas installation engineer who had come from Madrid to Almería as an explosives agent for mining. Her mother was Carmen Fernández-Tello, a qualified teacher and entrepreneur who opened a private school in the Andalusian city. Thanks to her activity, all her offspring had support after the father left the family shortly after Jimena was born.

Jimena moved to Madrid in 1917, before turning 18 years old, to study Sciences at Central University (precedent of the Complutense University of Madrid), while living at the "Residencia de Señoritas" (literally "Young Ladies Residence", the first official centre dedicated to encourage university education in women in Spain). Just as the "Residencia de Estudiantes" for male university students became a cultural institution where many bright Spanish intellectuals arose at the time, women from the worlds of culture, science and politics in Spain in the first half of the 20th century, such as Maruja Mallo, María Zambrano, Clara Campoamor, Matilde Huici and Victoria Kent knew Quirós because of this housing.

== Scientific career ==
Her interest in oceanography grew and, in April 1920 and while continuing her studies, she began working on marine science research as an intern at the Spanish Institute of Oceanography (IEO). This same summer, she travelled to Santander to help with the preparation of a project that would take place the following year. In 1921, a few months after graduating in Science with special mention, and she became the first female Spanish scientist on an oceanographic campaign. The expedition, led by the IEO, took place aboard the survey ship Giralda, lasted a month and travelled the Spanish shores of the Mediterranean. Jimena worked in the project as an assistant to the French oceanographer and naturalist Julien Thoulet, from the University of Nancy. Upon her return, and at only 22 years old, she won a competitive examination and joined the IEO laboratory in the Balearic Islands. She was the first female scientist hired by the institution in its history.

In March 1922 she moved to the laboratories located in Málaga to investigate the biology of mollusks. The Fishing Bulletin of the IEO in 1923 published her article about this work, the first scientific oceanography article written by a woman in Spain. In this study, Jimena detailed the biology of more than forty species, and also reported the depletion of some of them in the fishing areas of the bay of Malaga.

In 1925, Adrien Robert, professor at the Sorbonne (Paris), taught a course in marine biology at the IEO. Interested in the subject, Jimena travelled to work during the summer at the Laboratory of the University of Paris and at the Roscoff Biological Station, in Brittany (France). Her growing interest in travel and learning led her to apply for a one-year scholarship at the Physiography Laboratory of Columbia University in New York, and work with some of the best scientists of the time. She was awarded the grant in 1926 and travelled there to work on the physical geography of the atmosphere and the oceans, taking great advantage of her time abroad.

== Late years ==
In May 1932 Quirós was sent to the Cantabrian Sea to obtain oceanographic data. For three months she took daily measurements of the temperature, transparency and salinity of the water in two stations inside and outside the bay of Santander. In her reports, she noted the methodological errors in the guidelines for the samplings she had been given, and she was very critical of recent work carried out in the bay. Due to disagreements with some people from the IEO, a disciplinary file was opened upon her return, from which she was exonerated in mid-1934 due to the lack of foundation of the accusations. However, during this process, Jimena looked for an opportunity to have a change of air and obtained her teaching degree for secondary schools. She taught a course as a Natural History teacher at the New National Institute of Bilbao.

At the end of 1934 she returned to Madrid and re-joined the IEO, but at the beginning of the Civil War, the Government of the Republic asked her to return to practice as a high school teacher.

== Political activism ==
Besides science, Jimena Quirós was an remarkable advocate for gender equality and worked on politics to fight for women's rights. From 1924, she was vice-president of the Spanish University Women Association and in 1928 led the organization of a conference of the International Federation of University Women (IFUW). In 1930, after the fall of the dictatorship of Primo de Rivera, Jimena joined the Radical Socialist Republican Party. From 1932 on, she chaired the party's Women's Committee in its quest to achieve equal rights for women.

== After the civil war ==
After the war ended, the national side ordered Jimena to return to Madrid and appear before the Ministry of the Navy, which began to investigate her. In October 1940 he was informed its definitive cessation when considering it "Of leftist ideas, for having belonged to the Radical Socialist Republican Party since its foundation, having taken part in the deliberations and debates of the Party Congress and, when the Uprising took place, continuing to make manifestations of the same ideology and, in relation to the leaders of the Popular Front, having received different positions, predominantly cultural."

She survived the war, but both her scientific career and her fight for equality was truncated. From that moment she worked giving private lessons in a private academy and taking care of her mother.

In November 1966, Jimena Quirós undertook her attempt to demand her re-entry into the IEO. She obtained her rehabilitation three years later, although she continued to claim all her rights. She died in Madrid in 1983.
