= Spanish cruiser Reina Regente =

Reina Regente was the name of two Spanish protected cruisers:

- Spanish cruiser Reina Regente (1887), launched in 1887 and wrecked in 1895
- Spanish cruiser Reina Regente (1906), launched in 1906 and broken up for scrap in 1926
