= Spanish cruiser Lepanto =

Spanish Navy protected cruiser of 1899–1908

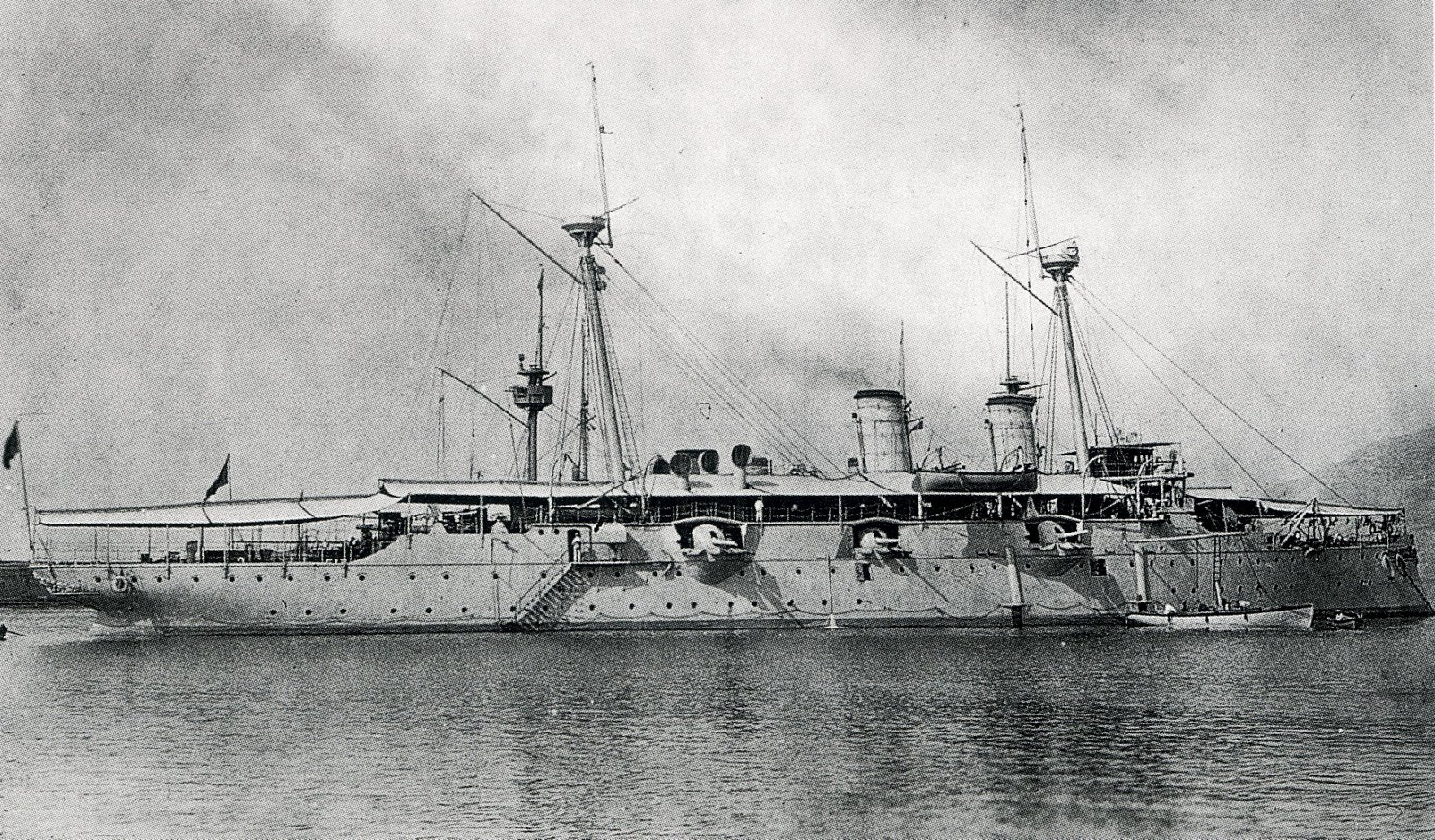
- Lepanto, c. 1900.

History

Spain
- Name: Lepanto
- Namesake: Battle of Lepanto
- Builder: Arsenal de Cartagena, Cartagena, Spain
- Laid down: 1 October 1886
- Launched: 16 November 1893
- Completed: 26 January 1899
- Commissioned: 29 January 1899
- Decommissioned: 3 October 1908
- Fate: Sold 1911; Scrapped

General characteristics
- Class & type: Reina Regente-class protected cruiser
- Displacement: 4,826 tons
- Length: 99.9 m (327 ft 9 in)
- Beam: 15.24 m (50 ft 0 in)
- Draught: 7.31 m (24 ft 0 in)
- Installed power: 11,500 hp (8,576 kW) (nominal)
- Propulsion: Two triple expansion steam engines, two screws
- Speed: 20.5 knots (38.0 km/h; 23.6 mph) (designed); 15 knots (28 km/h; 17 mph) (trials)
- Complement: 420
- Armament: As built: 4 x 1 - 200 mm (7.9 in)/35 Hontoria M1883; 6 x 1 - 4.7-inch (119 mm)/35 Hontoria M1883; 6 x 1 - 57 mm (2.2 in)/42 Nordenfelt; 2 x machine guns; 5 x torpedo tubes (2 bow, 2 beam, 1 aft)
- Armour: 120–80 mm (4.7–3.1 in) (main deck); 25 mm (1 in) (fore and aft)

Lepanto was a Reina Regente-class protected cruiser in commission in the Spanish Navy from 1899 to 1908. She was named for the 1571 Battle of Lepanto. She had a short career, spending most of it as a training ship.

== Characteristics ==
Lepanto in 1899

Lepanto was 99.9 metres (327 ft 9 in) long, with a beam of 15.24 metres (50 ft 0 in) and a draught of 7.31 metres (24 ft 0 in). She displaced 4,826 tons. She had two triple expansion steam engines rated at 11,500 nominal horsepower (8,576 kilowatts) that drove two screws.

== Construction and commissioning ==
Lepanto was the third and last Reina Regente-class protected cruiser. She was laid down on 1 October 1886 at the Arsenal de Cartagena in Cartagena, Spain, and launched on 16 November 1893. She was completed on 26 January 1899 and ran engine trials on the nautical measured mile off Cádiz, Spain, that day, managing only 15 knots (28 kilometres per hour; 17 miles per hour), far below her designed speed of 20 knots (37 kilometres per hour; 23 miles per hour). She nonetheless was commissioned on 29 January 1899.

== Service history ==
After putting to sea only a few times in her original configuration, Lepanto was redesignated for use as a gunnery and torpedo training ship. She was reclassified as a second-class cruiser and her 200-millimetre (7.9 in) guns were replaced with 160-millimetre (6.3 in) guns removed from the armoured frigates Numancia and Vitoria during their conversion into coastal defense ships.

In her new role, Lepanto made voyages in the Mediterranean Sea to train midshipmen, gunners, and torpedomen. Sailors assigned to her began wearing a distinctive cap with a ribbon bearing the ship's name; the use of a cap ribbon to identify sailors' postings later became widespread, and the ribbon became known in the Spanish Navy as the "Lepanto ribbon" or simply "Lepanto."

In April 1904, Lepanto, the armored cruiser Cardenal Cisneros, and the protected cruiser Río de la Plata departed Cádiz, Spain, escorting the royal yacht Giralda, upon which King Alfonso XIII was embarked for a visit to the Balearic Islands. The ships stopped first at Mahón on Menorca, then arrived on the afternoon of 21 April 1904 at Palma de Mallorca on Mallorca, where they rendezvoused with Numancia and a British Royal Navy squadron under the command of Vice-Admiral Charles Beresford that had arrived from Gibraltar. On the morning of 25 April Giralda and her escorts arrived at Ibiza, then set course for the Chafarinas Islands in the Alboran Sea in the western Mediterranean, which they reached on 26 April. On 27 April, the Spanish squadron departed for Málaga, Spain. Getting back underway from Málaga on 1 May 1904, the ships called at Melilla on the coast of North Africa. The king and his escorting ships then stopped at Chafarinas and Ceuta before ending the voyage at Cádiz.

Lepanto and the destroyer Osado conducted a training cruise in 1905, departing Palma de Mallorca in late May 1905 to carry out exercises in the waters off Ibiza and Cabrera before stopping at Mahón. They then visited Roses, Barcelona, Valencia, Alicante — which they reached on 16 June and where Lepanto ran aground on a sandbank — Santa Pola, and Cartagena.

Osado again accompanied Lepanto on Lepanto′s annual training cruise in 1906, during which they visited several ports in Spain and North Africa. The ships departed Cartagena on 30 April. After passing the Chafarinas Islands, they arrived in Melilla on 6 May 1906. They then called at Ceuta and reached Algeciras on 12 May. After Lepanto embarked representatives Sultan of Morocco Abdelaziz had sent to the 31 May wedding of King Alfonso XIII and Princess Victoria Eugenie of Battenberg, the ships returned them to Morocco, arriving at Tangier by mid-June. On 25 June, the ships called at Alicante. In mid-July, they got underway from Barcelona and proceeded to the Gulf of Roses, where they conducted gunnery and torpedo-firing drills. They then steamed to the Balearic Islands before concluding the training voyage at Cartagena in late July.

From 8 to 10 April 1907, Lepanto and her squadron — which also included Vitoria, the armoured cruiser Princesa de Asturias, and the protected cruiser Extremadura — joined the battleship Pelayo in attending a meeting between King Alfonso XIII of Spain and King Edward VII of the United Kingdom which took place in Cartagena's harbor.

== Disposal ==
Lepanto was decommissioned on 3 October 1908. The last surviving Reina Regente-class ship, she was sold in 1911 and subsequently scrapped.
