= Spanish ship Osado =

Various Spanish Navy ships

Two ships of the Spanish Navy have borne the name Osado, meaning Daring:

- Osado, a Furor-class destroyer in commission from 1898 to 1925.
- Osado, an Audaz-class destroyer in commission from 1956 to 1972.
