= Spanish cruiser Reina Regente (1906) =

Protected cruiser built for the Spanish Navy

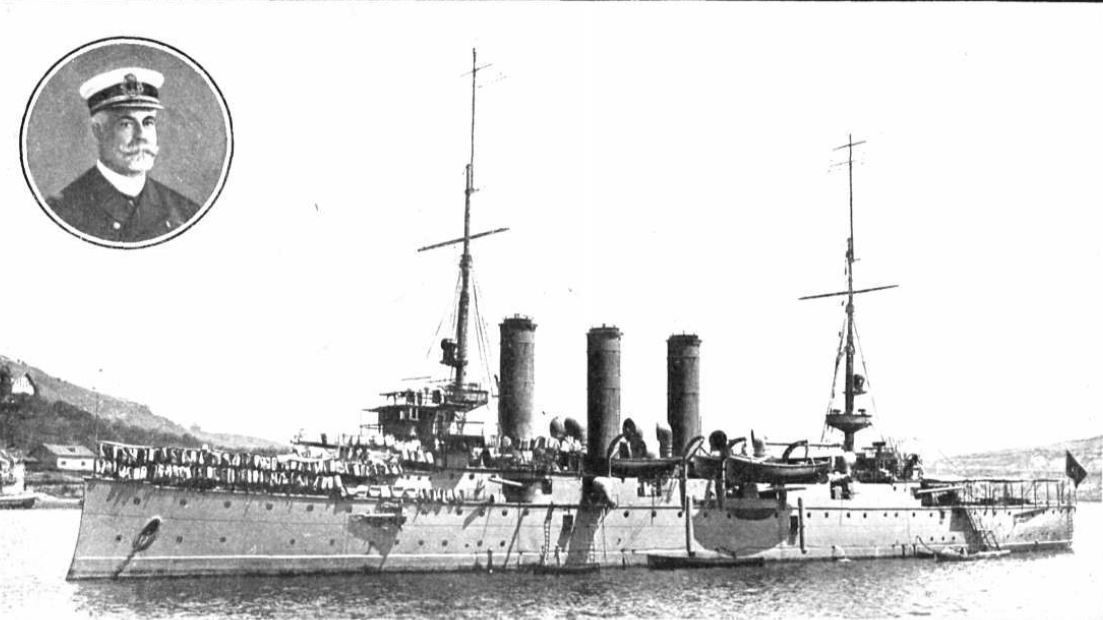
- Reina Regente in 1912

History

Spain
- Name: Reina Regente
- Namesake: Queen Regent Maria Christina
- Ordered: 1896
- Laid down: 27 March 1897
- Launched: 20 September 1906
- Commissioned: 1908
- Fate: Scrapped, 1926

General characteristics
- Type: Protected cruiser
- Displacement: 5,287 t (5,203 long tons)
- Length: 102.71 m (337 ft)
- Beam: 16.12 m (52 ft 11 in)
- Draft: 6.06 m (19 ft 11 in)
- Installed power: 15,000 indicated horsepower (11,000 kW)
- Propulsion: 2 × triple expansion engines; 2 × screw propellers
- Speed: 20 knots (37 km/h; 23 mph)
- Crew: 497
- Armament: 10 × 15 cm (5.9 in) guns; 12 × 6-pounder guns; 2 × 1-pounder guns; 8 × machine guns; 3 × torpedo tubes
- Armor: Deck: 3.5 in (89 mm); Conning tower: 3.5 in; Gun shields: 3 in (76 mm)

Reina Regente was a protected cruiser built for the Spanish Navy in the 1900s, the only member of her class. She had a very lengthy construction period, being laid down in 1897, launched in 1906, and finally completed in 1908. The last cruiser built in Spain for nearly twenty years, she was armed with a battery of ten 15 cm (5.9 in) guns and was capable of a top speed of 20 knots (37 km/h; 23 mph). Reina Regente's career was uneventful, the result of limited naval budgets and Spain's neutrality during World War I. In the early 1920s, she was employed as a training ship until she was discarded in 1926.

== Design ==
Reina Regente was 102.71 meters (337 ft) long, and she had a beam of 16.12 m (52 ft 11 in) and a draft of 6.06 m (19 ft 11 in). She displaced 5,287 metric tons (5,203 long tons). Powered by a pair of triple expansion steam engines rated at 15,000 indicated horsepower (11,000 kW), the ship was capable of a top speed of 20 knots (37 km/h; 23 mph). Her coal-fired boilers, the number of which and their type are not known, were trunked into three funnels. She had a coal storage capacity of 1,200 t (1,181 long tons). Her crew numbered 497 officers and enlisted men, and she was fitted with two pole masts equipped with fighting tops.

The ship was armed with a main battery of ten 15 cm (5.9 in) TR Gonzales de Rueda guns that were manufactured by Schneider-Creusot. Four were mounted in twin gun turrets, one mounted on either end of the ship, with the remainder in casemates in the upper deck. The turret guns were carried in individual cradles, which allowed them to be elevated and fired independently. They were supplied with 40 kg (88 lb) armor-piercing shells at a muzzle velocity of 800 m/s (2,600 ft/s). Her secondary battery consisted of twelve 6-pounder guns and a pair of 1-pounders. She also carried eight machine guns. Her armament was rounded out by three torpedo tubes. Reina Regente was protected by an armored deck that was 3.5 in (89 mm) thick. Her conning tower was protected by the same thickness of armor plate. The gun shields for the 15 cm guns were 3 in (76 mm) thick.

== Service history ==
Reina Regente was built in Ferrol, Spain; she was proposed in 1896, laid down on 27 March 1897, and launched on 20 September 1906. Fitting-out work proceeded slowly, and the ship finally entered service in 1908, after more than a decade of construction. In the aftermath of Spain's defeat in the Spanish–American War of 1898, the country's economy proved to be too weak to support a significant naval expansion program. As a result, Reina Regente was the last cruiser built for the Spanish Navy for nearly two decades, until the light cruiser Reina Victoria Eugenia was laid down in 1915.

The ship traveled to Britain in June 1911 to represent the country at the coronation fleet review for the new king, George V, held at Spithead on the 24th. The fleet included vessels from fifteen other countries in addition to the Royal Navy. On 15 November 1911, Reina Regente was present in Gibraltar for a port call made by George V during his trip to India. Reina Regente traveled to Constantinople, the capital of the Ottoman Empire, in late 1912. The ship was sent there, along with warships from most of the other European powers, to protect Spanish nationals during the First Balkan War that pitted the Ottomans against the Balkan League. The international fleet sent a total force of around 3,000 men ashore in Constantinople on 18 November, but by the end of the month, the Bulgarian Çatalca offensive had broken down, indicating that a cease fire would soon be needed. She was anchored off the Golden Horn in December during diplomatic negotiations with Chaim Nahum, the Grand Rabbi of the Ottoman Empire. Nahum was invited aboard the ship to inspect the vessel during the discussions. The European warships remained in the Sea of Marmara before being withdrawn to Crete in the Aegean Sea by February 1913.

In June 1913, Reina Regente was sent to assist the gunboat General Concha, which had run aground off the coast of Spanish Morocco; the latter vessel had come under fire from locals opposed to Spanish colonial rule. Reina Regente bombarded the attackers, fourteen of whom were killed, and numerous others were wounded. Spain remained neutral after World War I broke out in July 1914, and Reina Regente's service during the conflict was uneventful compared to her foreign contemporaries. In August, the Spanish government arrested Marcelino Domingo, an elected deputy in the Cortes Generales, over his involvement in domestic unrest in Barcelona. He was held for a time in solitary confinement aboard Reina Regente.

In the post-war period, she was used as a training ship and sent on overseas cruises. In 1920, she embarked on one such cruise to South American waters, and during a visit to Argentina in November, she was visited by the Argentine president, Hipólito Yrigoyen, and several government ministers. The cruise lasted into 1921, and in January, she stopped in Rio de Janeiro, Brazil, where she met the Italian battleship Roma and the British cruiser HMS Southampton. Reina Regente was in home waters in early 1923, when the recent British prime minister, David Lloyd George, visited Spain with his family. The Spanish government made the ship available to take the group from Seville to Ceuta in North Africa. The ship was eventually stricken from the naval register in 1926 and broken up for scrap.
