= Japanese destroyer Yamakaze =

Two destroyers of the Imperial Japanese Navy were named Yamakaze:

- Japanese destroyer Yamakaze (1911), an Umikaze-class destroyer launched in 1911, she was renamed W-8 and re-rated as a minesweeper in 1930; broken up in 1936
- Japanese destroyer Yamakaze (1936), a Shiratsuyu-class destroyer launched in 1936 and sunk in 1942
