= 4.7 inch gun =

A 4.7 inch Gun is any of a number of British-built 120 mm naval artillery guns. Several of these guns were designed and manufactured by the Elswick Ordnance Company, part of Armstrong Whitworth. They were a major export item and hence were actually of 120 millimetres (4.724 in) calibre to meet the requirements of metricised navies (although the size was ultimately based on a 12-pound round shot), 4.7 inch is an approximation used for the British designation. 4.7 inch guns include:

- QF 4.7 inch Gun Mk I - IV British naval gun deployed on cruisers 1888 to 1918, also as a field gun in World War I
- QF 4.7 inch Mk V naval gun Japanese-built gun, armed British merchant ships in World War I & World War II
- BL 4.7 inch /45 naval gun British naval gun used 1918 to 1945
- QF 4.7 inch Mk VIII naval gun British anti-aircraft gun on Nelson class battleships in World War II
- 4.7 inch QF Mark IX & XII British naval guns deployed on destroyers in World War II
- QF 4.7 inch Mark XI gun British naval gun deployed on destroyers in World War II

== See also ==
- 4.7 inch Gun M1906 United States field gun of 1906
- 4.7"/50 Mark 3 (Armstrong) United States naval gun built by Armstrong

== Bibliography ==
- Campbell, John (1985). Naval Weapons of World War II. Annapolis, Maryland: Naval Institute Press. ISBN 0-87021-459-4.
