= Japanese minesweeper W-8 =

Three Japanese minesweepers have been named No.8 minesweeper (第八号掃海艇, Dai Hachi Gō Sōkaitei, or "W-8"):

- Japanese minesweeper No. 8 (1928), ex-Japanese destroyer Uranami (1907), a Kamikaze-class destroyer (1905) of the Imperial Japanese Navy in World War I
- Japanese minesweeper No. 8 (1930), ex-Japanese destroyer Yamakaze (1911), a Umikaze-class destroyer of the Imperial Japanese Navy in World War I
- Japanese minesweeper No. 8 (1938), a No.7-class minesweeper (1938) of the Imperial Japanese Navy in World War II

== See also ==
- Japanese auxiliary minesweeper No. 8, a No.1-class auxiliary minesweeper of the Imperial Japanese Navy in World War II
- JDS Minesweeping boat No. 8 (MSB-708), a MSB No.7-class minesweeping boat of the Japan Maritime Self-Defense Force
