= Japanese ship Tachibana =

Three Japanese warships have been named Tachibana (橘 / たちばな; Tachibana orange):

- Japanese destroyer Tachibana (1912), a Sakura-class destroyer of the Imperial Japanese Navy during World War I
- Japanese destroyer Tachibana (1944), lead ship of her class that served the Imperial Japanese Navy
  - Tachibana-class destroyer, a class of destroyer built for the Imperial Japanese Navy during World War II
- JS Tachibana, a Sakura-class patrol ship of the Japan Maritime Self-Defense Force

== See also ==
- Tachibana (disambiguation)
