= Japanese destroyer Sakura (1911) =

Sakura-class destroyer

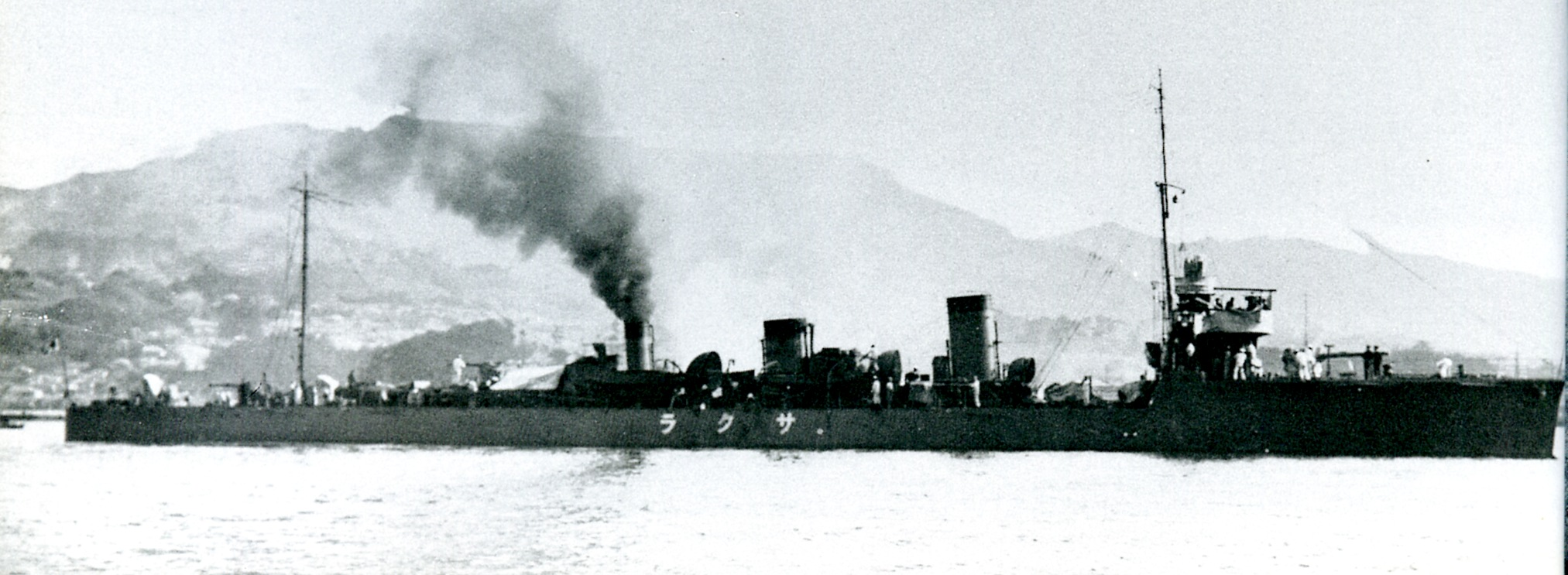
- Destroyer Sakura at Sasebo, 1918

History

Empire of Japan
- Name: Sakura
- Builder: Maizuru Naval Arsenal
- Laid down: March 1911
- Launched: 20 December 1911
- Commissioned: 21 May 1912
- Fate: Scrapped 1933

General characteristics
- Class & type: Sakura-class destroyer
- Displacement: 605 tons normal; 830 tons full load
- Length: 83.6 m (274 ft)
- Beam: 7.3 m (24 ft)
- Draught: 2.2 m (7.2 ft)
- Propulsion: reciprocating engines, 9,500 ihp (7,100 kW)
- Speed: 30 knots (56 km/h; 35 mph)
- Range: 2,400 nautical miles (4,400 km; 2,800 mi) at 15 knots (28 km/h; 17 mph)
- Complement: 92
- Armament: 1 × 120 mm/40 cal Type 41 guns; 4 × 76 mm/40 cal Type 41 guns; 4 × 457 mm torpedo tubes

Sakura was a Sakura-class destroyer of the Imperial Japanese Navy, built under the 1910 Programme as a 2nd Class destroyer.

== Design ==
Sakura and her sister ship Tachibana were at first planned to be large ocean-going vessels however due to financial problems they were redesigned to a smaller type. Unlike the preceding Umikaze class, which was powered by Parsons turbines, Tachibana was installed with vertical expansion engines.

== Service ==
The ship, built at the Maizuru Naval Arsenal, was launched in 1911, completed in 1912, and entered service shortly afterward. After 20 years of service, Sakura was decommissioned in 1932 and scrapped in 1933.
