= Japanese destroyer Umikaze =

Two destroyers of the Imperial Japanese Navy were named Umikaze:

- Japanese destroyer Umikaze (1910), an Umikaze-class destroyer launched in 1910, she was renamed W-7 and re-rated as a minesweeper in 1930; broken up in 1936
- Japanese destroyer Umikaze (1936), a Shiratsuyu-class destroyer launched in 1936 and sunk in 1944
