= 4.7-inch/50-caliber Mark 3 gun =

4.7"/50 caliber Mark 3 Armstong Gun
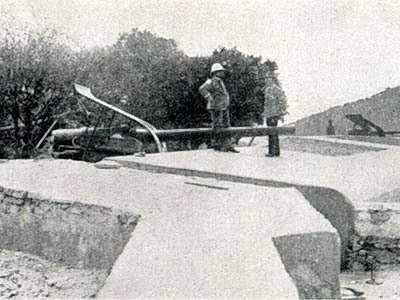
- 4.7"/50 Mark 3 guns from Almirante Barroso used in Brazilian fortifications.
- Type: Naval gun; Coastal defence gun
- Place of origin: United Kingdom

Service history
- In service: 1895–1924
- Used by: United States Navy
- Wars: Spanish–American War

Production history
- Designer: Elswick Ordnance
- Designed: 1885
- Manufacturer: Elswick Ordnance
- No. built: 8
- Variants: Mark 3

Specifications
- Mass: 4,200 lb (1,900 kg)
- Length: 236.2 in (6.00 m)
- Barrel length: 231.1 in (5.87 m) bore (48.9 calibers)
- Shell: 45 lb (20 kg)
- Caliber: 4.724 inches (120 mm)
- Elevation: −3° to +20°
- Rate of fire: 5–6 rounds per minute
- Muzzle velocity: 2,215 ft/s (675 m/s)
- Maximum firing range: 9,900-yard (9,053 m) at 20° elevation

The 4.7"/50 caliber Armstong gun (spoken "four-point-seven-inch-fifty-caliber") were used in the secondary batteries of the United States Navy's protected cruisers New Orleans and Albany during the Spanish–American War.

== Design ==
The Mark 3 was a 48.9 calibers built-up gun designed and built in the United Kingdom for use in the two New Orleans-class protected cruisers that the US Navy had purchased from the United Kingdom before the Spanish–American War. They were based on the British 4.7-inch Gun Mark IV, but a non-standard export model, the standard Mark IV was 40 caliber. They were constructed of a tube with a jacket and four hoops that went from the breech to the muzzle.

In 1903 the eight guns from New Orleans and Albany were removed and replaced with 5-inch (127 mm)/50 caliber guns. These guns were relocated to Fort Wint on Grande Island in the Philippines, in 1907, to guard the entrance to Subic Bay. One of the guns was later mounted on the British armed yacht Eileen during World War I.

In the US Navy they were referred to as 4.7"/50 Mark 3 Armstrong, or as a "large case" gun, to help distinguish them from the additional earlier "small case" 4.7"/47 Mark 1 and 4.7"/42 Mark 2 guns that had been purchased from Vickers & Sons in the 1890s. Sometime after 1906 two other 4.7" guns were purchased and designated as Mark 4's but no other details survive. By 1924 all of these guns had been "surveyed and condemned" and taken out of service.

== Naval Service ==
Ship	Gun Installed	Gun Mount
USS New Orleans (CL-22)	Mark 3: 4 × 4.7"/50 caliber (removed 1903)	Mark 1: 4 × single CP type mounts
USS Albany (CL-23)	Mark 3: 4 × 4.7"/50 caliber (removed 1903)	Mark 1: 4 × single CP type mounts
