= Japanese destroyer Tachibana (1912) =

Sakura-class destroyer

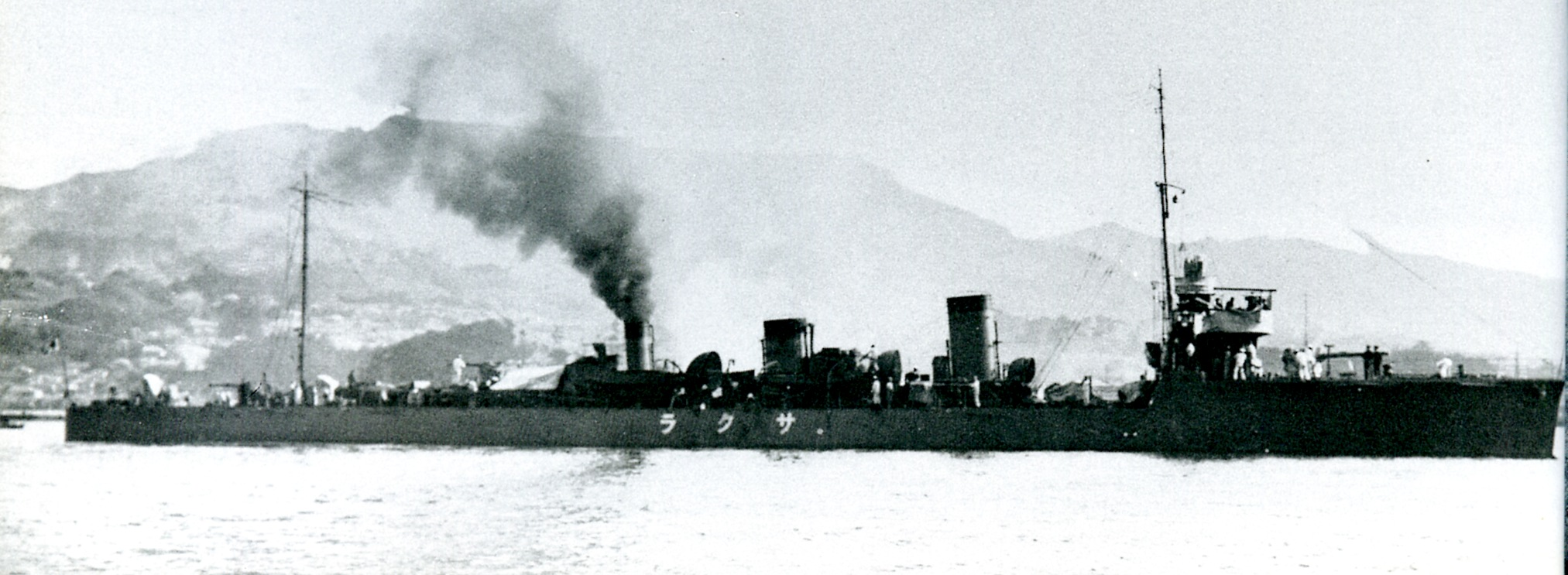
- Sister ship Sakura at Sasebo, 1918

History

Empire of Japan
- Name: Tachibana
- Builder: Maizuru Naval Arsenal
- Laid down: 29 April 1911
- Launched: 27 January 1912
- Fate: Scrapped 1933

General characteristics
- Class & type: Sakura class
- Displacement: 605 tons normal; 830 tons full load
- Length: 83.6 m (274 ft)
- Beam: 7.3 m (24 ft)
- Draught: 2.2 m (7.2 ft)
- Propulsion: reciprocating engines, 9,500 ihp (7,100 kW)
- Speed: 30 knots (56 km/h; 35 mph)
- Range: 2,400 nautical miles (4,400 km; 2,800 mi) at 15 knots (28 km/h; 17 mph)
- Complement: 92
- Armament: 1 × 120 mm/40 cal Type 41 guns; 4 × 76 mm/40 cal Type 41 guns; 4 × 457 mm torpedo tubes

Tachibana (橘) was a Sakura-class destroyer of the Imperial Japanese Navy.

== Design ==
Tachibana and her sister ship Sakura were at first planned to be large ocean-going vessels however due to financial problems they were redesigned to a smaller type. Unlike the preceding Umikaze class, which was powered by Parsons turbines, Sakura and Tachibana were installed with Kanpon vertical expansion engines.

== Service ==
The ship, built at the Maizuru Naval Arsenal, was launched and completed in 1912, and entered service shortly afterward. After 20 years of service, Tachibana was decommissioned in 1932 and scrapped in 1933.
