= Tachibana =

The term Tachibana (橘 or 立花) has at least two different meanings, and has been used in several contexts.

== People ==
- Tachibana clan (kuge) (橘氏) – a clan of kuge (court nobles) prominent in the Nara and Heian periods (710–1185)
- Tachibana clan (samurai) (立花氏) – a clan of daimyō (feudal lords) prominent in the Muromachi, Sengoku and Edo periods (1333–1868)
- Tachibana (surname)

== Other ==
- Tachibana-class destroyer, a class Japanese warships during World War II
- Japanese destroyer Tachibana, two destroyers of the Imperial Japanese Navy
- Tachibana, Fukuoka, a former town in Fukuoka Prefecture
- Tachibana Station, a railway station in Hyogo Prefecture
- Tachibana castle, a castle which formerly stood atop Tachibana Mountain
- Tachibana orange, a wild citrus fruit native to Japan

== See also ==
- Rikka (立花, 'standing flowers'), a form of ikebana
