= Umikaze =

Umikaze (海風 ”Sea Breeze”) can refer to:

- Umikaze-class destroyer - a World War I destroyer class in the Imperial Japanese Navy
  - Japanese destroyer Umikaze (1910) - The lead ship of the Umikaze-class destroyers
- Japanese destroyer Umikaze (1936) - a World War II destroyer in the Imperial Japanese Navy
- Office Umikaze - a Japanese talent agency
