= New Orleans-class cruiser (1896) =

United States Navy protected cruiser class

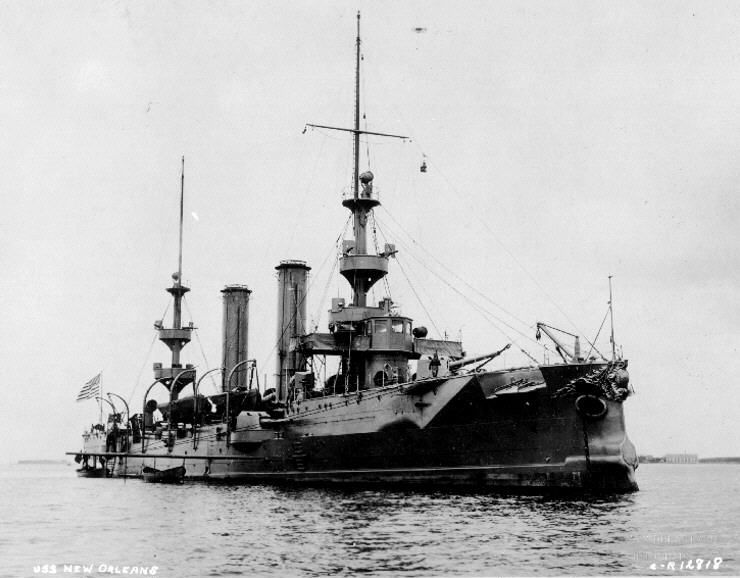
- USS New Orleans circa 1898

Class overview
- Name: New Orleans class
- Builders: Armstrong Whitworth, Elswick, England
- Operators: United States Navy
- Preceded by: Columbia class
- Succeeded by: Denver class
- Built: 1895–1900
- In commission: 1898–1922
- Completed: 2
- Scrapped: 2

General characteristics (as built)
- Type: Protected cruiser
- Displacement: 3,769 long tons (3,829 t)
- Length: 354 ft 5 in (108.03 m)
- Beam: 43 ft 9 in (13.34 m)
- Draft: 18 ft (5.5 m)
- Installed power: 4 × double-ended Scotch marine boilers; 2 × Inverted vertical triple expansion engines; 7,500 ihp (5,600 kW)
- Propulsion: 2 × screws
- Speed: 20.5 knots (38.0 km/h; 23.6 mph)
- Complement: 366
- Armament: 6 × 6 in (152 mm)/50 rapid fire (RF) guns; 4 × 4.7 in (119 mm)/50 RF guns; 10 × 6 pdr 57 mm (2.2 in) Hotchkiss RF guns; 8 × 1 pdr 37 mm (1.5 in) RF guns; 4 × .30-cal. (7.62 mm) Maxim machine guns; 3 × 18 in (457 mm) torpedo tubes
- Armor: 4 in (102 mm) gun shields; 4 in (102 mm) conning tower; 3 1/2 in (89 mm) (slopes) & 1 1/4 in (32 mm) (flat) deck

General characteristics (1907)
- Armament: 10 × 5 in (127 mm)/50 caliber guns; 8 × 3 pdr 47 mm (1.9 in) RF guns

General characteristics (1918)
- Armament: 8 × 5 in (127 mm)/50 caliber guns; 1 × 3 in (76 mm)/50 caliber anti-aircraft gun

The New Orleans class of protected cruisers of the United States Navy consisted of two ships, which were built for the Brazilian Navy at Elswick, near Newcastle Upon Tyne, England, by Armstrong Whitworth. The Brazilian Navy had ordered four Elswick cruisers, but had already sold the first ship during construction to Chile as Ministro Zenteno. One ship was delivered to Brazil, named Almirante Barroso. The third ship was fitting out as Amazonas, and the fourth was on order as Almirante Abreu.

On 16 March 1898, the United States Navy purchased the undelivered ships to prevent them from being acquired by the Spanish Navy and to augment the US Navy shortly before the Spanish–American War.

== Design and construction ==
=== Armament ===
These ships were originally armed with six 6-inch (152 mm)/50 caliber rapid-fire (RF) guns and four 4.7-inch (119 mm)/50 caliber RF guns. These were British-made, export-model guns built by Elswick Ordnance Company, a subsidiary of Armstrong. One source states the 6-inch guns were Elswick Pattern DD and the 4.7-inch guns were Pattern AA. These guns were unique in the US Navy, and they were designated as "6"/50 caliber Mark 5 Armstrong guns" and "4.7"/50 caliber Mark 3 Armstrong guns". The 6-inch guns were arranged with one each fore and aft, and two each fore and aft in sponsons on the sides to allow ahead or astern fire. The 4.7-inch guns were on the broadside. Three 18-inch (457 mm) torpedo tubes for Whitehead torpedoes were also equipped. Additional weapons included ten 6-pounder 57 mm (2.2 in) Hotchkiss RF guns, eight 1-pounder 37 mm (1.5 in) RF guns, and four .30-cal. (7.62 mm) Maxim machine guns.

=== Armor ===
Harvey armor was used on these ships. The armored deck was 3 1/2 in (89 mm) on the sloped sides and 1 1/4 in (32 mm) in the flat middle. The main guns had 4 in (102 mm) shields and the conning tower had 4 in (102 mm) armor. One source also lists 4 in (102 mm) on the boiler room glacis.

=== Engineering ===
The engineering plant included four, double-ended, coal-fired Scotch marine boilers supplying steam to two inverted, vertical, triple expansion engines (made by Humphrys and Tennant in New Orleans, Hawthorn Leslie in Albany), which produced 7,500 ihp (5,600 kW) for a design speed of 20.5 knots (38.0 km/h; 23.6 mph), which was achieved on trials. The normal coal allowance was 512 tons, but this could be increased to 747 tons.

=== Refits ===
To reduce supply difficulties, during refits at the Cavite Navy Yard in the Philippines in 1903, both ships had their 4.7-inch guns replaced with standard 5-inch (127 mm)/50 caliber Mark 5 guns; the 6-inch guns were replaced with additional 5-inch guns in 1907. Their torpedo tubes were also removed in the 1903 refits. At least some of the guns from these ships were emplaced in the Grande Island/Subic Bay area 1907-1910 and operated by the United States Marine Corps until the Coast Artillery Corps' modern defenses centered on Fort Wint were completed. During World War I the 5-inch guns were reduced from ten to eight and a 3-inch (76 mm)/50 caliber anti-aircraft gun was added. At least one 6-inch gun Mark 5 was delivered to the Army during that war for potential service on M1917B field carriages on the Western Front; it is unclear if these weapons were shipped overseas.

== Service ==
New Orleans (ex-Amazonas) served in the Spanish–American War, World War I, and the Russian Civil War in Siberia.

Albany (ex-Almirante Abreu) was completed too late to see service in the Spanish–American War. She served first in the Philippine–American War and then in World War I and the Russian Civil War in Siberia.

Both cruisers were decommissioned in 1922 and were sold for scrapping in 1930.

== Ships in class ==
The two ships of the New Orleans class were:

Ship	Shipyard	Laid down	Launched	Commissioned	Decommissioned	Fate
USS New Orleans (CL-22)	Armstrong Whitworth, Elswick, England	1895	4 December 1896	18 March 1898	16 November 1922	Sold for scrap 11 February 1930
USS Albany (CL-23)	Armstrong Whitworth, Elswick, England	1897	14 January 1899	29 May 1900	10 October 1922	Sold for scrap 11 February 1930

These ships did not initially have hull numbers. On 17 July 1920 they were designated with the hull numbers PG-34 (gunboat) and PG-36. On 8 August 1921 they were redesignated with the hull numbers CL-22 (light cruiser) and CL-23.

== Legacy ==
Two 4.7-inch guns (one from each ship of the class) are preserved at the Kane County, Illinois Soldier and Sailor Monument at the former courthouse in Geneva, Illinois.

== See also ==
- New Orleans-class cruiser - unrelated New Orleans-class cruisers in commission 1930s–1950s.
- List of cruisers of the United States Navy

== Bibliography ==
- Bauer, K. Jack; Roberts, Stephen S. (1991). Register of Ships of the U.S. Navy, 1775–1990: Major Combatants. Westport, Connecticut: Greenwood Press. ISBN 0-313-26202-0.
- Burr, Lawrence (2011). US Cruisers 1883-1904: The Birth of the Steel Navy. Osprey Publishing. ISBN 9781780962702.
- Friedman, Norman (1984). U.S. Cruisers: An Illustrated Design History. Annapolis, Maryland: Naval Institute Press. ISBN 0-87021-718-6.
- Gardiner, Robert; Chesneau, Roger (1979). Conway's All the World's Fighting Ships 1860–1905. New York: Mayflower Books. ISBN 0-8317-0302-4.
- Williford, Glen (2016). American Breechloading Mobile Artillery, 1875-1953. Atglen, PA: Schiffer Publishing, Ltd. ISBN 978-0-7643-5049-8.
