= Sakura-class destroyer =

Destroyer class of the Imperial Japanese Navy

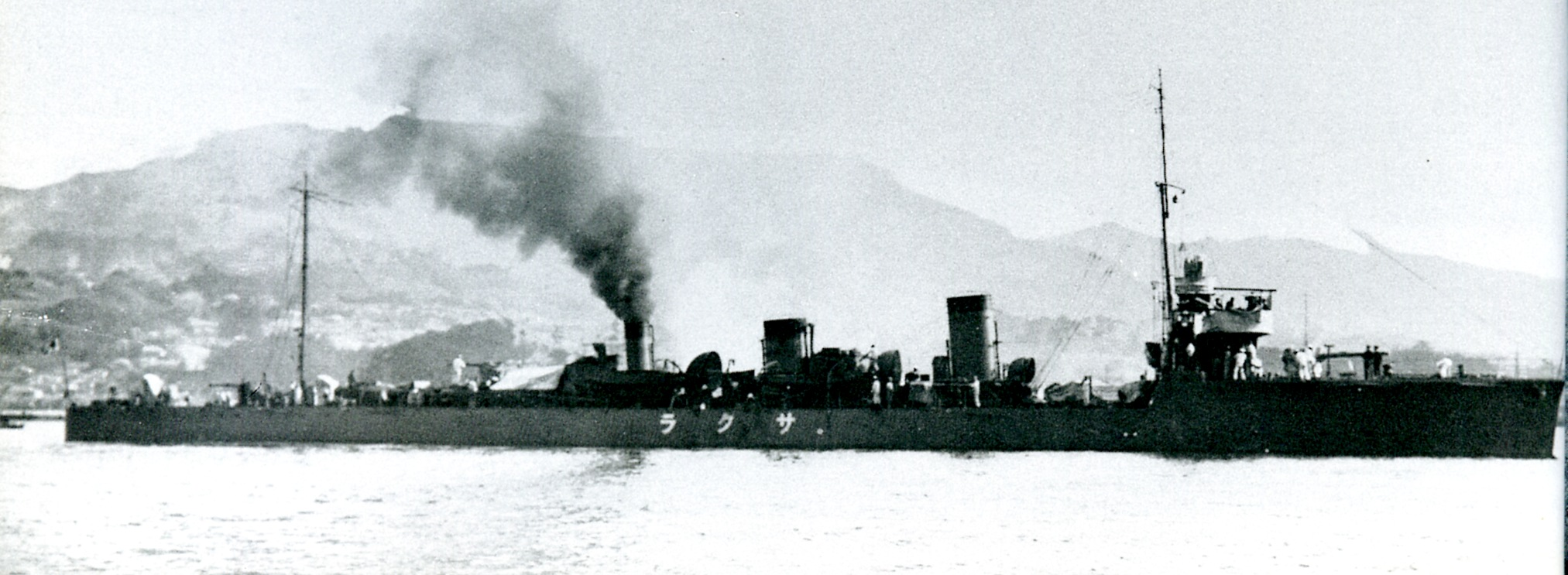
- Sakura at Sasebo, December 1918

Class overview
- Name: Sakura class
- Builders: Maizuru Naval Arsenal
- Operators: Imperial Japanese Navy
- Preceded by: Umikaze class
- Succeeded by: Urakaze class
- In commission: 21 May 1912 - 1 April 1932
- Completed: 2
- Retired: 2

General characteristics
- Type: Destroyer
- Displacement: 530 tons normal, 830 tons full load
- Length: 79.2 m (260 ft) pp; 83.6 m (274 ft) overall
- Beam: 7.3 m (24 ft)
- Draught: 2.2 m (7.2 ft)
- Propulsion: coal-fired boilers, triple-expansion reciprocating engines, 9,500 ihp (7,100 kW)
- Speed: 30 kn (56 km/h)
- Range: 2,400 nmi (4,400 km) at 12 kn (22 km/h)
- Complement: 94
- Armament: 1 × 120 mm/40 cal guns; 4 × 80 mm/40 cal guns; 4 × 450 mm torpedoes

The Sakura-class destroyers (桜型駆逐艦, Sakuragata kuchikukan) was a class of two destroyers of the Imperial Japanese Navy.

== Background ==
Although unable to obtain funding in fiscal year 1907 for additional Umikaze-class destroyers, which were expensive due to their large size and imported steam turbines, the Imperial Japanese Navy was also unwilling to purchase three additional Kamikaze-class destroyers as recommended by the government. In a compromise, the Navy agreed to purchase two medium size ships instead.

Both were designed and built at the Maizuru Naval Arsenal in Japan.

== Design ==
The Sakura-class ships were half the displacement of the previous Umikaze class but with the same basic hull design. Externally, the design went from four to three smokestacks, which was a first for the Japanese Navy; however, internally the troublesome heavy fuel oil-fired Parsons steam turbine engines of the Umikaze class were replaced by standard coal-fired triple expansion steam engines, which gave better reliability and fuel consumption. The lower rated power of 9,500 shaft horsepower (7,100 kW) gave the vessels a maximum speed of 30 knots (56 km/h), however, better fuel consumption equated to longer range, which was what the Imperial Japanese Navy needed.

Armament was similar to that of the Umikaze class, with one QF 4.7 inch Gun Mk I - IV, mounted on the forecastle deck forward of the bridge, and four 3-inch (76 mm) QF 12 pounder 12 cwt naval guns, mounted one on either side and two towards the stern of the ship, with two twin 450-mm torpedoes launchers.

== Operational history ==
Japan had fifty destroyers operational at the start of World War I. Although intended for coastal operation, with the Umikaze-class destroyers too short in range to operate overseas and with all previous classes of destroyers too small and/or obsolete for front-line service, the two Sakura-class destroyers were Japan's most advanced front-line destroyers during the opening stages of the war. Both were deployed extensively overseas as part of Japan's contribution to the war effort under the terms of the Anglo-Japanese Alliance.

The Sakura-class ships were re-rated as second-class destroyers on 28 August 1912, and served until 1 April 1932 when both were retired.

== Ships ==
Construction data
Kanji	Name	Builder	Laid down	Launched	Completed	Fate
櫻	Sakura "Cherry Tree"	Maizuru Naval Arsenal	31 March 1911	20 December 1911	21 May 1912	Retired, 1 April 1932
橘	Tachibana "Mandarin Orange"	Maizuru Naval Arsenal	29 April 1911	27 January 1912	25 June 1912	Retired, 1 April 1932
