= Japanese destroyer Yamakaze (1911) =

Destroyer of the Imperial Japanese Navy

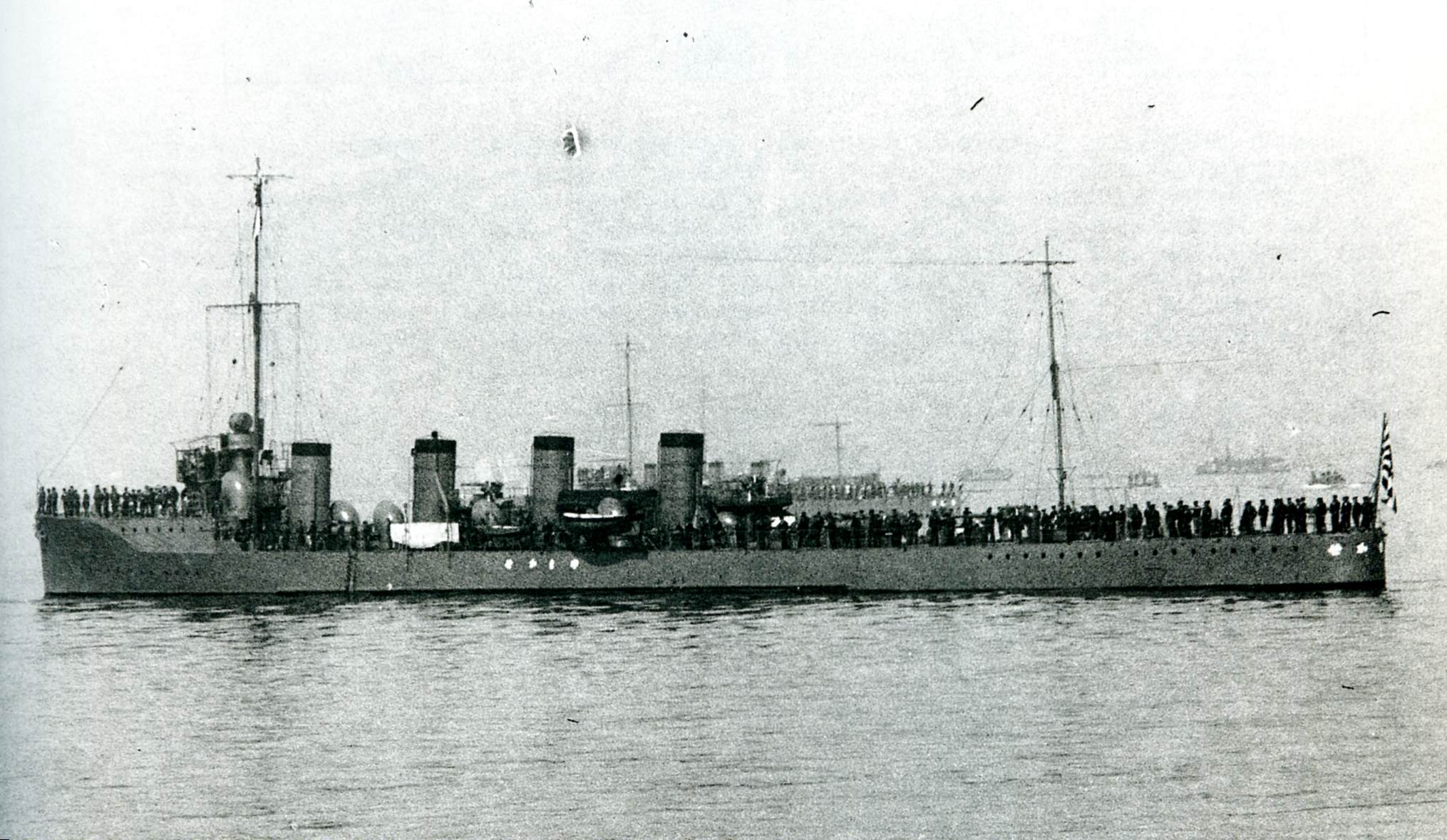
- Yamakaze at Ominato, 1926

History

Japan
- Name: Yamakaze
- Builder: Mitsubishi shipyards, Nagasaki, Japan
- Laid down: June 1, 1910
- Launched: January 21, 1911
- Commissioned: October 21, 1911
- Decommissioned: April 1, 1936
- Renamed: Minesweeper No. 8, 1930
- Reclassified: As minesweeper, 1930
- Stricken: 1936
- Fate: Sold for scrap, 1936

General characteristics
- Class & type: Umikaze-class destroyer
- Displacement: 1,030 long tons (1,050 t) normal, 1,150 long tons (1,170 t)
- Length: 94.5 m (310 ft 0 in) (pp), 98.5 m (323 ft 2 in) (o/a)
- Beam: 8.6 m (28 ft 3 in)
- Draught: 2.7 m (8 ft 10 in)
- Installed power: 8 boilers; 20,500 shp (15,300 kW)
- Propulsion: 3 shafts; 3 steam turbine sets
- Speed: 33 knots (61 km/h; 38 mph)
- Range: 850 nmi (1,570 km; 980 mi) at 11 knots (20 km/h; 13 mph)
- Complement: 140
- Armament: 2 × 4.7 in (120 mm) guns; 5 × 12 pdr (76.2 mm) guns; 3 × single 18 in (457 mm) torpedo tubes

Yamakaze (山風, "Mountain Wind") was an Umikaze-class destroyer of the Imperial Japanese Navy. The second and last ship of this class to be built, she was completed in 1911. After mostly serving as a coastal patrol boat during World War I, she was converted to a minesweeper on June 1, 1930, along with her sister ship, Umikaze. On April 1, 1936 she was scrapped after 25 years of service.

== Background ==
The Umikaze-class destroyers were designed after the Russo-Japanese War, as the Imperial Japanese Navy realized that the vessels in its current fleet of destroyers were too small and poorly designed for extended "blue water" operation.

== Design and construction ==
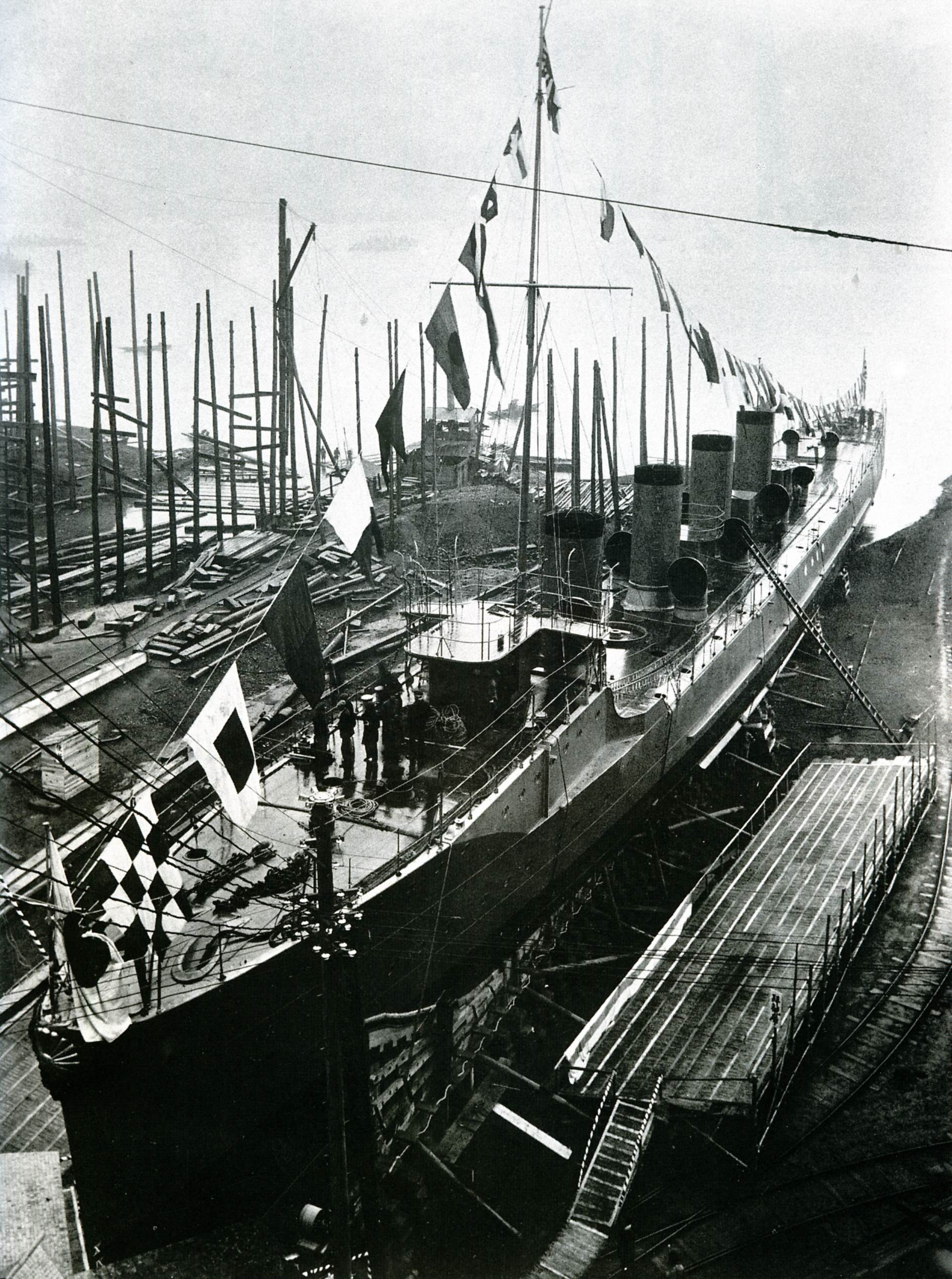
Yamakaze launch at Mitsubishi Nagasaki, 1911

The Umikaze-class ships were based largely on the Royal Navy Tribal-class destroyers. In terms of displacement, each vessel was almost three times larger than the previous destroyers in the Japanese Navy.

The ship was 98.5 metres (323 ft 2 in) long overall and 94.5 metres (310 ft 0 in) between perpendiculars, with a beam of 8.5 metres (27 ft 11 in) and a draft of 2.7 metres (8 ft 10 in). Displacement was 1,030 long tons (1,050 t) normal and 1,150 long tons (1,170 t) full load. Externally, the design retained the four-smokestacks of the Ikazuchi class, however, internally the coal-fired triple expansion steam engines, were replaced by mixed-fired (i.e. a mixture of oil and coal-fired) boilers feeding steam to Parsons steam turbines, which drove three propeller shafts. The rated power of 20,500 shp (15,300 kW) gave the vessels a speed of 33 knots (61 km/h; 38 mph). The ship had a range of 2,700 nautical miles (5,000 km; 3,100 mi) at 15 knots (28 km/h; 17 mph).

Armament was increased over the previous classes, with a pair of QF 4.7 inch Gun Mk I - IV guns, with one gun mounted on a small shelter forward and another on the quarterdeck and five QF 3 inch 12 pounder guns; One gun was mounted on each broadside at the break of the forecastle and the remaining guns were mounted on the centerline. The number of torpedoes was initially three in unreloadable tubes; but this was quickly changed to two in reloadable tubes in operational service.

After some delays due to her turbines not being delivered until March 1910, Yamkaze was launched on January 21, 1911 and commissioned on 21 October 1911.

== Service history ==
During World War I, Yamakaze mostly served as a coastal patrol boat and did not participate in any battle. In September 1914 Yamakaze, along with sister ship Umikaze and the armored cruisers Kurama, Tsukuba and Asama set out from Yokosuka to search for the German East Asia Squadron commanded by Vice Admiral Maximilian von Spee in the South Sea Islands. After the German cruiser Emden was sunk in the Battle of Cocos by the Australian cruiser Sydney, the Japanese forces in the South Pacific and Indian Ocean were reorganised into two squadrons to search for von Spee's ships, with Yamakaze joining the Second Southern Squadron, based at Truk. On June 1, 1930, she was converted to a minesweeper and renamed W-8. Yamakaze was scrapped on April 1, 1936.

== Bibliography ==
- Evans, David (1979). Kaigun: Strategy, Tactics, and Technology in the Imperial Japanese Navy, 1887-1941. US Naval Institute Press. ISBN 0-87021-192-7.
- Gardiner, Robert & Gray, Randal, eds. (1985). Conway's All the World's Fighting Ships 1906–1921. London: Conway Maritime Press. ISBN 0-85177-245-5.
- Jentschura, Hansgeorg; Jung, Dieter & Mickel, Peter (1977). Warships of the Imperial Japanese Navy, 1869–1945. Annapolis, Maryland: United States Naval Institute. ISBN 0-87021-893-X.
- Monograph No. 16: The China Squadron, 1914, Including the Emden Hunt (PDF). Naval Staff Monographs (Historical). Vol. V. The Eastern Squadrons, 1914. Naval Staff, Training and Staff Duties Division. 1922. pp. 17–116.
