= Tachibana (surname) =

Tachibana (written: 橘 or 立花) is a Japanese surname.

== Classical period ==
- Tachibana Dōsetsu (立花 道雪, 1513–1585), Japanese samurai of the Sengoku period
- Tachibana Ginchiyo (立花 誾千代, 1569–1602), head of the Tachibana clan during the Sengoku Period, daughter of Tachibana Dōsetsu
- Tachibana Muneshige (立花 宗茂, 1567–1642), samurai during the Azuchi–Momoyama period, adopted son of Tachibana Dōsetsu

Cf. Tachibana clan (kuge)

== Modernity ==
- Tachibana Kōichirō (立花小一郎, 1861–1925), general in the Imperial Japanese Navy and pre-war politician
- Tachibana Shūta (橘周太, 1865–1904), Russo-Japanese War hero
- Yoshio Tachibana (立花 芳夫, 1890–1946), lieutenant general in the World War II Imperial Japanese Army, executed for war crimes
- Zuicho Tachibana (橘 瑞超, 1890–1968), Buddhist priest and archaeologist, explorer of the East Asia
- Masato Tachibana (橘 典人; born 1972), Japanese weightlifter
- Tachibana Hidenori (橘 秀宣, born 1978), Japanese voice actor who goes by Shinnosuke Tachibana (立花 慎之介)
- Keita Tachibana (橘 慶太, born 1985), lead singer of the J-pop boy band w-inds.
- Tatsumaru Tachibana (橘龍丸; born 1991), Japanese voice actor
- Rika Tachibana (立花 理香, born 1987), Japanese voice actress and model
- Ayumu Tachibana (立花 歩夢; born 1995), Japanese footballer
- Takashi Tachibana (立花孝志; born 1967), political activist

== Fictional characters ==
=== Film ===
- Taizo and Yuri Tachibana, a commander in the Japanese Maritime Self-Defense Force and his reporter daughter, in the film Godzilla, Mothra & King Ghidorah: Giant Monsters All-Out Attack
- Sōsaku Tachibana, a mechanic stationed on Odo Island at the end of World War II, in the film Godzilla Minus One

=== Live-action TV shows ===
- Tobei Tachibana, a character in the tokusatsu television series Kamen Rider, Kamen Rider V3, Kamen Rider X, Kamen Rider Amazon, and Kamen Rider Stronger
- Sakuya Tachibana, a character in the tokusatsu television show Kamen Rider Blade
- Dr. Wato Tachibana, a character in the Sherlock Holmes-themed drama series Miss Sherlock

=== Manga and anime ===
- Akira Tachibana, main character of manga and anime After the Rain
- Ryoki Tachibana, a character in the shōjo manga Hot Gimmick
- An Tachibana and Kippei Tachibana, characters in the shōnen manga The Prince of Tennis
- Asuka Tachibana, a character in the anime television series s-CRY-ed
- Ryohei Tachibana, a character in the OVA anime Sky Girls
- Shito Tachibana, a character in the manga Zombie-Loan
- Sugane Tachibana (橘 清音), a character in the anime series Gatchaman Crowds
- Taki Tachibana, one of the protagonists of Kimi no Na wa
- Hinata Tachibana, and Naoto Tachibana from Tokyo Revengers
- Satsuki Tachibana, main character in anime Watari-kun’s ******* is about to Collapse.

=== Gaming ===
- Maria Tachibana, a character in the media franchise Sakura Wars
- Ukyo Tachibana, a character in the Samurai Shodown video game series
