= USS Albany (CL-23) =

1899 New Orleans-class cruiser

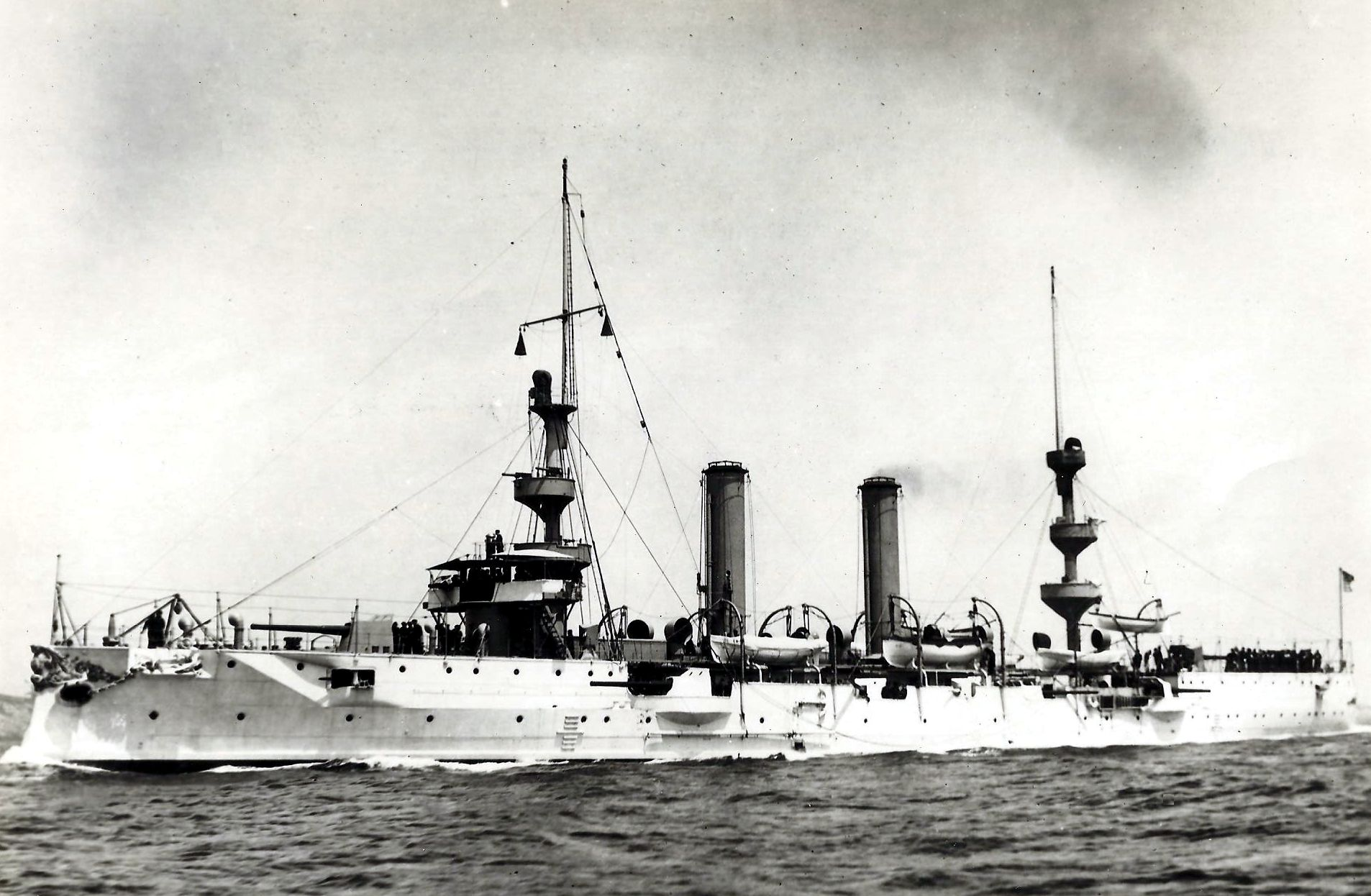
- USS Albany at sea

History

United States
- Name: Albany
- Namesake: Albany, New York
- Ordered: Almirante Abreu for the Brazilian Navy in 1898
- Builder: Armstrong, Mitchell and Co., Newcastle upon Tyne, England
- Yard number: 676
- Laid down: 8 December 1897
- Launched: 14 January 1899
- Sponsored by: Mrs. John C. Colwell
- Acquired: 16 March 1898
- Commissioned: 29 May 1900
- Decommissioned: ca. June 1904
- Recommissioned: 10 June 1907
- Decommissioned: 23 December 1913
- Recommissioned: 17 April 1914
- Decommissioned: 4 December 1914
- Recommissioned: 21 May 1916
- Decommissioned: 10 October 1922
- Reclassified: CL 23 on 8 August 1921
- Stricken: 3 November 1929
- Identification: Hull symbol:CL-23
- Fate: sold for scrapping 11 February 1930

General characteristics
- Class & type: New Orleans class protected cruiser
- Displacement: 3,428 long tons (3,483 t)
- Length: 354 ft 9 1/2 in (108.141 m)
- Beam: 43 ft 9 in (13.34 m)
- Draft: 17 ft 6 in (5.33 m)
- Installed power: 4 × cylindrical boilers; 6,500 shp (4,800 kW)
- Propulsion: 2 × 4-cylinder Vertical triple expansion steam engines; 2 × screws
- Speed: 20.52 knots (24 mph; 38 km/h)
- Complement: 363 officers and enlisted
- Armament: 6 × 6-inch (152 mm) guns; 4 × 4.7-inch (119 mm) guns; 10 × 57-millimeter (2 in) 6-pdr Hotchkiss guns; 4 × 1-pounder guns; 4 machine guns; 3 × 18-inch (457 mm) torpedo tubes
- Armor: Deck: 1.5–3.5 in (38–89 mm); Conning tower: 4 in (102 mm)

The third USS Albany (later PG-36 and CL-23) was a United States Navy protected cruiser of the New Orleans class. She saw service in the Philippine–American War and World War I.

== Construction and acquisition ==
Albany was originally laid down at Newcastle upon Tyne, England, by Armstrong Whitworth on 8 December 1897 for the Brazilian Navy as Almirante Abreu, but was purchased while still on the ways by the United States Navy on 16 March 1898 to prevent her from being acquired by the Spanish Navy during the Spanish–American War. She was renamed Albany and launched in February 1899, sponsored by Mrs. John C. Colwell, the wife of the American naval attaché in London. She was commissioned in the River Tyne, England, on 29 May 1900. Cost $1,207,644.13 (hull and machinery).

== Service history ==
=== Philippine Squadron ===
On 26 June 1900, Albany put to sea bound for service in the Philippines with the Philippine–American War. Steaming via Gibraltar, the Mediterranean Sea, the Suez Canal, and the Indian Ocean, the cruiser arrived at Cavite in the Philippines on 22 November. She served with the Asiatic Fleet in the Philippines for the next seven months. During that tour of duty, the protected cruiser visited Hong Kong, from 28 December 1900 to 17 February 1901, for repairs in drydock. On 3 July 1901, she departed Cavite to return to the European Station. Retracing the path of her maiden voyage, Albany transited the Suez Canal early in September and reentered the Mediterranean on 15 September.

=== Europe ===
For the following nine months, the warship cruised the warm waters of the Mediterranean visiting ports in Greece, France, Italy, Spain and Egypt. She entered the Atlantic on 18 June 1902 and, after stops at Cherbourg, France, and Southampton, England, rendezvoused with USS Illinois (Battleship No. 7) and protected cruisers USS Chicago and USS San Francisco (Cruiser No. 5) off Galloper light vessel on 12 July. She exercised with those ships until 20 July at which time she set a course for the Baltic Sea. During her sojourn in the waters of northern Europe, she visited Stockholm, Sweden; Kronstadt, Russia; and Copenhagen, Denmark. Early in September, she exited the Baltic and, after a visit to Plymouth, reentered the Mediterranean on the 12th. After almost two months of duty in the "middle sea," Albany set a course for the western hemisphere early in November. She arrived in the West Indies in late November and ended the year in fleet tactical maneuvers which she concluded early in January 1903. On the 5th, the ship set a course for Boston. After repairs at Boston and at the New York Navy Yard, Albany got underway on 15 February 1903 to return to European waters.

1903 U.S.S. Albany in dry dock Boston, Massachusetts

=== Asiatic Fleet ===
At the end of a brief tour of duty in the Mediterranean, she transited the Suez Canal at the end of May 1903, and set a course for the Far East. She stopped for coal at Hong Kong and then joined the Asiatic Fleet at Yantai in northern China. She spent most of the remainder of 1903 operating with that fleet in the waters of northern China, Korea, and Japan. Upon returning to Kobe and proceeding thence to Yokohama, the protected cruiser embarked upon a voyage to Hawaii on 3 December. She arrived in Honolulu on the 16th and remained there until the 29th at which time she headed back toward the western Pacific.

She made a stop at Guam in the Ladrone (now Marianas) Islands before arriving at Cavite in the Philippines on 20 January 1904. She operated in the Philippines for about a month and headed for the coast of China on 19 February. The warship reached Shanghai four days later and remained in the vicinity for a month before getting underway for the Philippines on 22 March. She laid over at Cavite from 26 March to 18 April. The cruiser made another brief voyage to Shanghai and back to the Philippines between 18 and 30 April. Following a week at Cavite, she put to sea, bound for the United States. She made stops en route at Guam and Honolulu and arrived in port at Bremerton, Washington, on 16 June. Soon thereafter, Albany was placed out of commission at the Puget Sound Navy Yard. The protected cruiser remained inactive for almost three years.

=== Pacific Fleet ===
On 10 June 1907, she was placed in full commission, Comdr. Henry T. Mayo in command. Assigned to the Pacific Fleet, Albany spent the next three years cruising the western coasts of North and Central America. Her duty on the west coast of North America consisted primarily of training evolutions but also included surveillance missions along the coast of Central America in protection of United States citizens and their interests in the perennially unsettled republics there. She visited ports in Mexico, Honduras, El Salvador, and Nicaragua.

=== Special Service Squadron ===
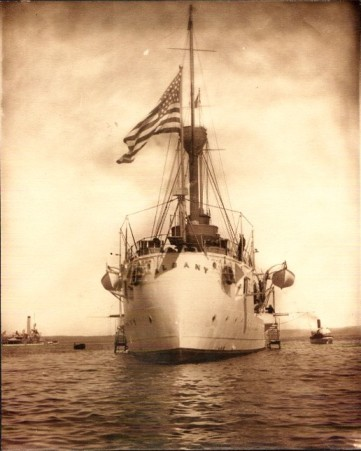
Albany at Santa Monica, California, 8–10 September 1909.

On the evening of 16 April 1908, Albany, Commander Henry T. Mayo, commanding, received expedited orders to immediately prepare to depart Mare Island and proceed to San Diego to embark "special peace envoy" William I. Buchanan and then on to Central America for a two-month "peace-keeping" cruise. Albany departed Mare Island on 20 April. For the next fifteen months, she cruised the west coast of North and Central America and conducted surveillance missions to protect U.S. citizens and property in the perennially unsettled republics of Mexico, Honduras, El Salvador and Nicaragua, returning to Mare Island on 18 July 1909.

By January 1909, Albany was transferred from the Pacific Fleet to the Special Service Squadron, signifying her patrol mission and readiness to disembark landing forces to protect American interests in Mexico and Central America.

In April 1909, while rendez-vousing with other Navy ships at Magdalena Bay, Baja California Sur, Albany assisted in the rescue of passengers from the stricken mail steamship Indiana that had run aground off Isla Santa Margarita.

From 8–10 September 1909, Albany and the protected cruiser USS St. Louis (C-20) along with three torpedo boats were anchored at Santa Monica Bay for dedication ceremonies of the Santa Monica Municipal Pier to coincide with California Admission Day. Visitors toured the warships and four companies of bluejackets, two from each cruiser, marched in a parade from the Santa Monica, California city hall to the new pier.

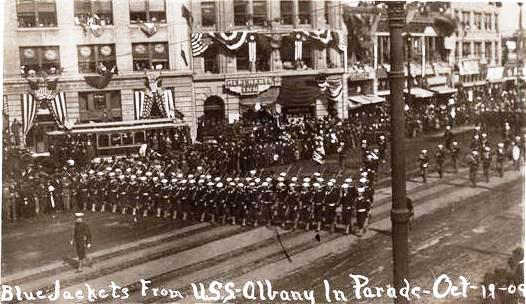
USS Albany sailors on parade during the Portola Festival in San Francisco, California, on 19 October 1909.

In October 1909, while Albany was at Mare Island undergoing repairs and preparing to steam south to Magdalena Bay, she and other U.S. and foreign warships, participated in the Portola Festival at San Francisco, a city-wide fair held on 19–23 October to mark the 140th anniversary of the Portolá expedition, the first recorded Spanish (and European) land entry and exploration of present-day California, and to proclaim to the world that San Francisco was recovered from its devastating 1906 earthquake.

=== Duties in Pacific and Mexican waters ===
Nicaragua proved to be her primary area of operations during the first part of 1910 when she was attached to Rear Admiral William W. Kimball's Nicaraguan expeditionary force. She returned north to the Puget Sound Navy Yard in May to begin preparations to deploy once more to the Asiatic Fleet. On 4 August, she departed the navy yard on her way to Chinese waters. After stops at Honolulu in Hawaii and Yokohama in Japan, Albany arrived at Woosung, China, on 15 September. For almost three years, the protected cruiser plied Far Eastern waters visiting ports from the Philippines to China to Japan.

On 20 September 1913, the warship left Yokohama, bound for home. She stopped at Honolulu from 31 October to 5 November and arrived in San Francisco on 12 November. She moved north to Puget Sound at mid-month and was placed in reserve there on 23 December. Following repairs, she was recommissioned on 17 April 1914. That summer and fall, she cruised Mexican waters in the wake of the incident at Tampico and the resultant landing at Veracruz. She concluded that duty late in November and, on 4 December 1914, was placed out of commission at Bremerton, for a general overhaul. At the conclusion of those repairs late in the spring of 1915, Albany was assigned training duty with the state naval militias of Washington and Oregon. On 12 May 1916, she was returned to full commission, Lt. Comdr. Orin G. Murfin in command. Upon returning to active service, she once again headed for Mexican waters – this time as part of the United States' response to the massacre of American citizens in Columbus, New Mexico, perpetrated by Pancho Villa and his band of marauders.

=== World War I ===
By early 1917, Albany was operating with the U.S. Atlantic Fleet off the coast of Virginia. This change in assignment came as a result of worsening relations between the United States and the German Empire over the latter country's unrestricted submarine warfare campaign. In February and March relations deteriorated rapidly; and, early in April, the United States entered World War I on the side of the Allied Powers.

On 5 July, Albany received orders to report to New York for convoy duty. She was assigned duties as flagship for Squadron 6, Patrol Force, Atlantic Fleet. As such, she carried the flag of Rear Admiral William C. Watts. For the duration of World War I, the cruiser escorted convoys of merchant ships, cargomen, and troop transports back and forth across the Atlantic. Between July 1917 and the end of the war on 11 November 1918, she shepherded 11 such convoys safely between the United States and Europe.

=== Later career ===
In 1919, Albany was once more assigned to the Asiatic Fleet. At that time, the Russian Civil War was being fought between Bolshevik and non-Bolshevik (a diverse group made up of people whose only common ground was opposition to the Bolsheviks) factions. Various Allied powers sent military contingents to several Russian ports. The United States landed troops at Vladivostok in Siberia, possibly to check Japanese pretensions in that area and to secure that port as an exit for the Czech Legion then transiting the Trans-Siberian Railway. In 1919 and early 1920, Albany did several tours of duty at Vladivostok in support of American troops ashore. She also sent armed landing parties ashore on several occasions in further support of those troops and to evacuate sick and wounded men.

American troops were withdrawn in the spring of 1920, and Albany resumed normal peacetime duty with the Asiatic Fleet. That service included the usual summers in Chinese waters alternated with winters in the Philippines. Reclassified as a gunboat as PG-36 on 17 July 1920, Albany was again reclassified as a light cruiser as CL-23 on 8 August 1921.

== Decommissioning and disposal ==
In July 1922, Albany departed Chinese waters for the last time and headed home. She arrived at the Mare Island Navy Yard on 6 August and was placed out of commission on 10 October 1922. She was berthed at Mare Island until 3 November 1929, when her name was struck from the Naval Vessel Register. On 11 February 1930, Albany was sold for scrapping.

== Armament ==
Albany was originally armed with six 6"/50 caliber (152 mm) guns and four 4.7"/50 caliber (120 mm) guns. These were British-made export-model guns built by Elswick Ordnance Company, a subsidiary of Armstrong. These guns were unique in the US Navy to Albany and her sister New Orleans, and they were designated as "6"/50 caliber Mark 5 Armstrong guns" and "4.7"/50 caliber Mark 3 Armstrong guns". To reduce supply difficulties, during refits at the Cavite Navy Yard in the Philippines in 1903, both ships had their 4.7-inch guns replaced with standard 5-inch (127 mm)/50 caliber Mark 5 guns; the 6-inch guns were replaced with 5-inch guns in 1907. Their torpedo tubes were also removed in the 1903 refits. At least some of the guns from these ships were emplaced in the Grande Island/Subic Bay area 1907-1910 and operated by the United States Marine Corps until the Coast Artillery Corps' modern defenses centered on Fort Wint were completed. During World War I the 5-inch guns were reduced from ten to eight and a 3"/50 caliber (76 mm) anti-aircraft gun was added. Two 4.7-inch guns (one from each ship of the class) are preserved at the Kane County, Illinois Soldier and Sailor Monument at the former courthouse in Geneva, Illinois. The gun from Albany was the No. 5 gun, presented on 1 April 1925.
