= USS New Orleans (CL-22) =

United States Navy warship

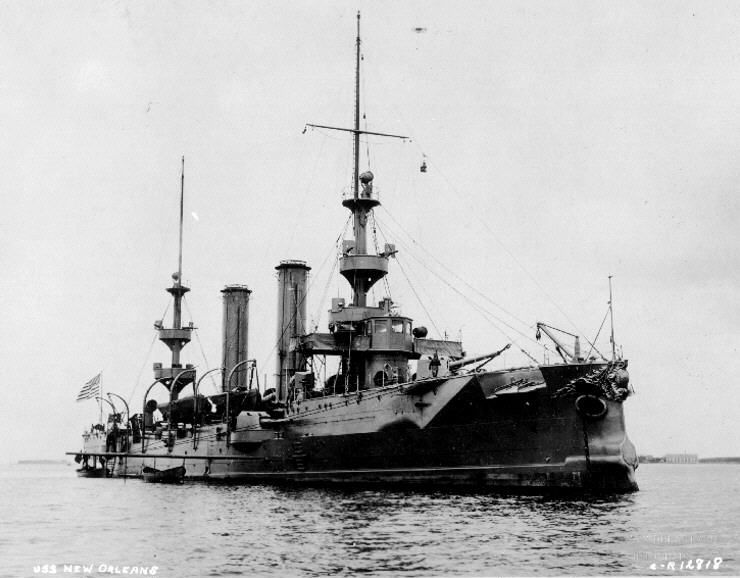
- USS New Orleans photographed during the Spanish–American War, 1898.

History

United States
- Name: New Orleans
- Namesake: New Orleans, Louisiana
- Ordered: Amazonas for the Brazilian Navy in 1895
- Builder: Armstrong, Mitchell and Co., Newcastle upon Tyne, England
- Laid down: 1895
- Launched: 4 December 1896
- Commissioned: 18 March 1898
- Decommissioned: 16 November 1922
- Reclassified: CL 22 on 8 August 1921
- Stricken: 13 November 1929
- Identification: Hull symbol:CL-22
- Fate: 11 February 1930, sold for scrap

General characteristics
- Class & type: New Orleans class protected cruiser
- Displacement: 3,769 long tons (3,829 t)
- Length: 354 ft 5 in (108.03 m)
- Beam: 43 ft 9 in (13.34 m)
- Draft: 18 ft (5.5 m)
- Installed power: 7,500 shp (5,600 kW)
- Propulsion: 2 × vertical, inverted triple expansion engines; 2 × screws
- Speed: 20 knots (37 km/h; 23 mph)
- Complement: 366 officers and enlisted
- Armament: 6 × 6 in (152 mm) (6 × 1); 4 × 4.7 in (120 mm) (4 × 1); 10 × 6-pounder (2.25 in) (10 × 1); 8 × 1-pounder (1 in) (8 × 1); 2 × 0.30 calibre (7.62 mm) guns (2 × 1); 3 × 18 in (457 mm) torpedo tubes
- Armor: Gun shields: 4 in (100 mm); Main deck: 3.5 in (89 mm); Conning Tower: 4 in (100 mm)

USS New Orleans (later designated PG-34 then CL-22) was a United States Navy protected cruiser of the New Orleans class.

She was laid down in 1895 as Amazonas for the Brazilian Navy by Armstrong, Mitchell and Company, Newcastle upon Tyne, England, launched on 4 December 1896, purchased by the U.S. Navy while building on 16 March 1898; and commissioned 18 March 1898 at Gravesend, England.

== Service history ==
New Orleans sailed on 27 March 1898 to fit out at New York, New York, for service in the Spanish–American War. She left Norfolk, Virginia, on 17 May and joined the Flying Squadron off Santiago de Cuba on 30 May. The next afternoon, with Massachusetts (BB-2) and Iowa (BB-4), she reconnoitered the harbor, exchanging fire with Spanish ships and shore batteries. After joining in the bombardment of the batteries at the entrance to the harbor 6 and 16 June, New Orleans sailed to coal at Key West, and was thus absent during the Battle of Santiago de Cuba on 3 July.

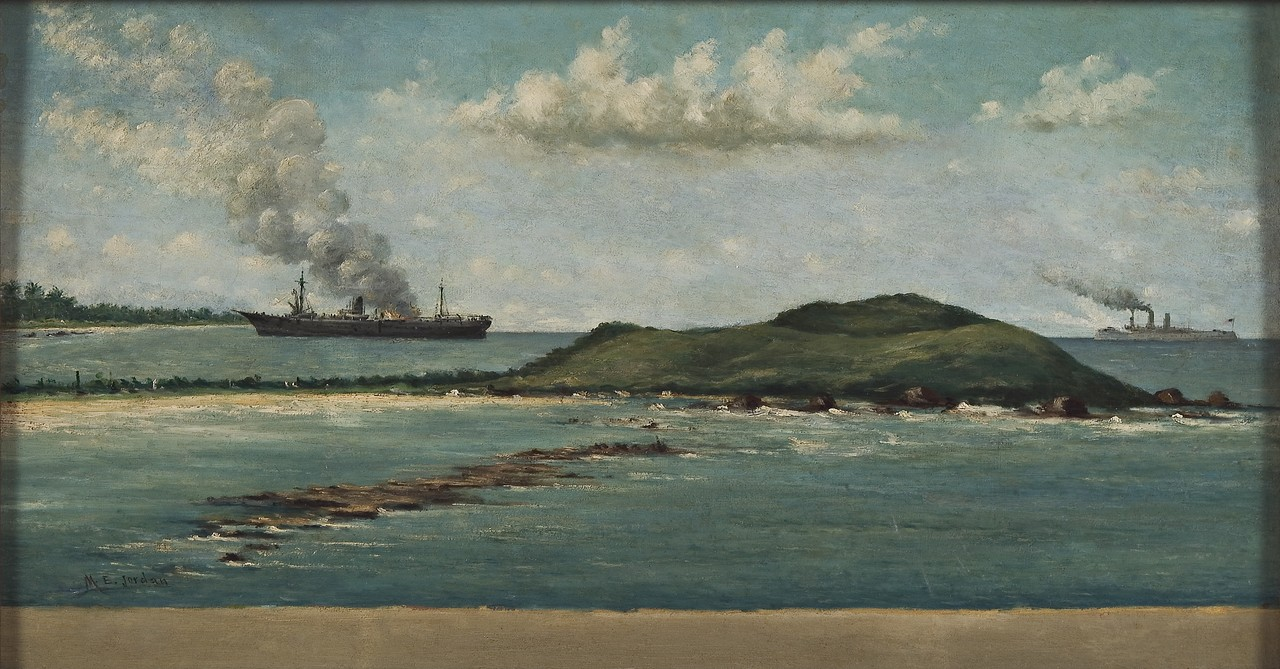
Painting by Manuel Jordan showing the USS New Orleans (on the right) burning the beached Spanish steamer Antonio Lopez (on the left) near the coast of Puerto Rico.

Through the summer, New Orleans cruised on blockade between San Juan, Puerto Rico, and Guantanamo Bay, Cuba, burning the beached Spanish steamer Antonio Lopez near the coast of Puerto Rico on 16 July, and capturing the French blockade runner Olinde Rodrigues on 17 July. She arrived at Philadelphia, on 20 October for the Peace Jubilee, then prepared at New York to launch her peacetime service with a visit to New Orleans, from 16 May through 29 May 1899. After summer exercises off the Atlantic seaboard, she sailed from New York on 21 October to join the Asiatic Fleet. She called at the Azores and Port Said, passed through the Suez Canal, and reached Manila on 21 December. For the next 5 years, as flagship of the Cruiser Squadron, U.S. Asiatic Fleet, she cruised the Philippines and the China coast. Relieved by Baltimore (C-3), she departed Cavite on 27 December 1904 for Mare Island Navy Yard, arriving there on 27 January 1905 to decommission on 6 February 1905.

Recommissioning on 15 November 1909, New Orleans returned to Asiatic duty at Yokohama on 25 April 1910. She cruised the Orient until returning to Bremerton, Washington, on 14 February 1912 and going into reserve. Again in full commission on 31 December 1913, New Orleans patrolled the west coast of Mexico during the tense spring of 1914, then trained the Washington Naval Militia through the summer, returning to Mexican waters in the fall. Upon American entry into World War I, she was overhauled at Puget Sound, and sailed for the Panama Canal and the East Coast, arriving at Hampton Roads on 27 August 1917.

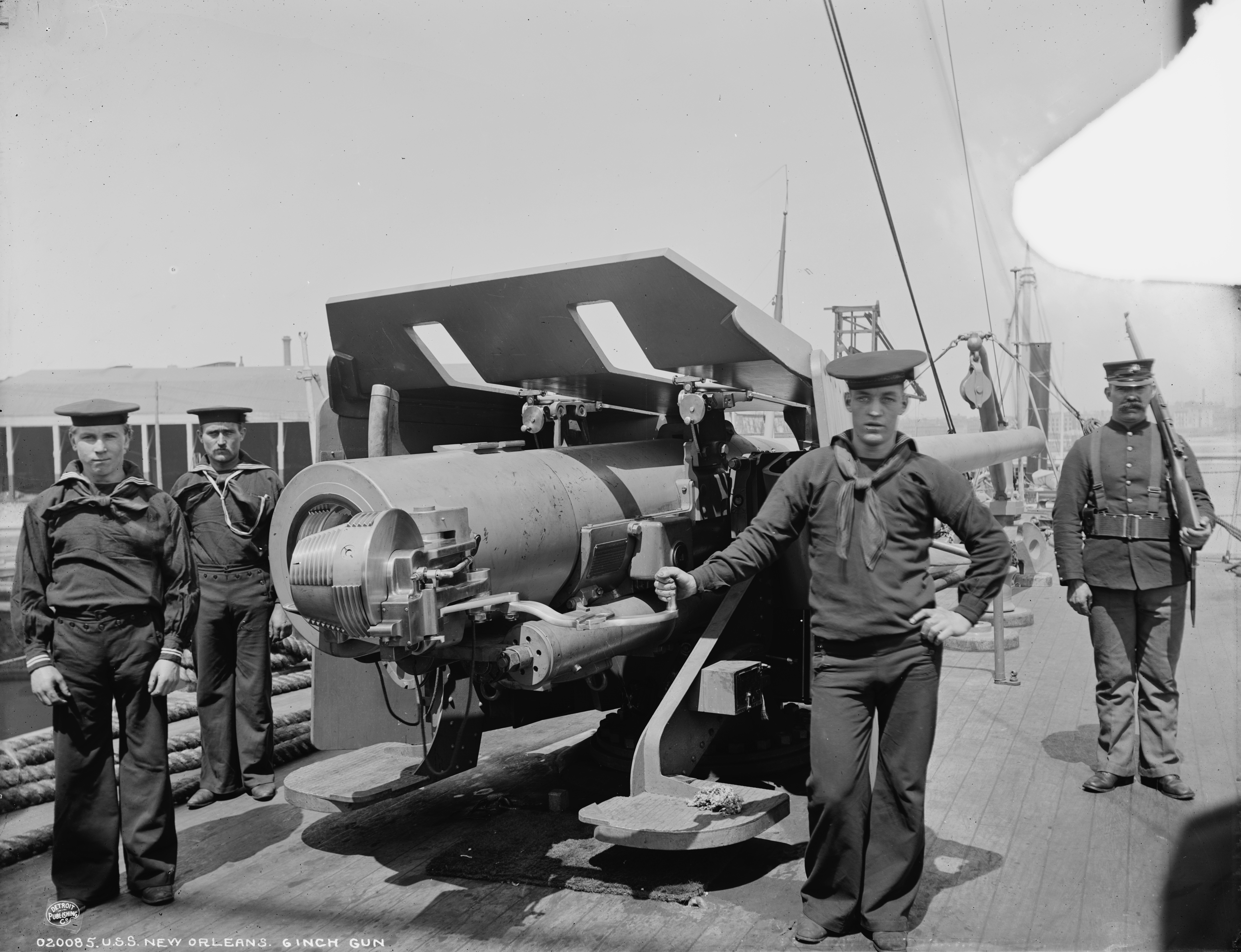
6-inch gun on USS New Orleans

New Orleans escorted convoys from New York City to ocean rendezvous with destroyer escorts off the British Isles and the French coast until 16 January 1918, when she cleared New York for the Asiatic Station. She reached Yokohama from Honolulu and Panama on 13 March, cruised to China, and the Philippines, and from 17 July to 20 December 1919 was station ship at Vladivostok, Russia, supporting the Allied force in Siberia.

After repairs at Cavite, New Orleans returned to Vladivostok to resume her service for the Allied Expeditionary Force from 20 May to 27 September 1920. During further cruising with the Asiatic Fleet she was redesignated CL-22 on 8 August 1921, then completed her service at Vladivostok 14 February to 17 August 1922. She returned to Mare Island on 23 September, decommissioned there on 16 November 1922, and was struck from the Naval Vessel Register on 13 November 1929. On 1 April 1925 the 4.7-inch gun No. 5 was presented to Kane County, Illinois by the U.S. government and is currently on display at the Kane County courthouse in Geneva Illinois. She was sold for scrapping on 11 February 1930.

== Armament ==
New Orleans was originally armed with six 6"/50 caliber (152 mm) guns and four 4.7"/50 caliber (120 mm) guns. These were British-made export-model guns built by Elswick Ordnance Company, a subsidiary of Armstrong. These guns were unique in the US Navy to New Orleans and her sister Albany, and they were designated as "6"/50 caliber Mark 5 Armstrong guns" and "4.7"/50 caliber Mark 3 Armstrong guns". To reduce supply difficulties, during refits at the Cavite Navy Yard in the Philippines in 1903, both ships had their 4.7-inch guns replaced with standard 5-inch (127 mm)/50 caliber Mark 5 guns; the 6-inch guns were replaced with 5-inch guns in 1907. Their torpedo tubes were also removed in the 1903 refits. At least some of the guns from these ships were emplaced in the Grande Island/Subic Bay area 1907-1910 and operated by the United States Marine Corps until the Coast Artillery Corps' modern defenses centered on Fort Wint were completed. During World War I the 5-inch guns were reduced from ten to eight and a 3"/50 caliber (76 mm) anti-aircraft gun was added. Two 4.7-inch guns (one from each ship of the class) are preserved at the Kane County, Illinois Soldier and Sailor Monument at the former courthouse in Geneva, Illinois.
