= QF 4.7-inch Mk I–IV naval gun =

QF 4.7-inch gun Mk I – IV
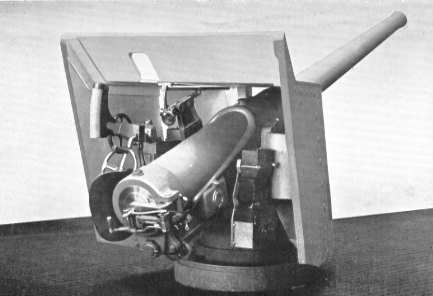
- Typical naval deck mounting, 1890s
- Type: Naval gun Medium field gun Coastal defence gun
- Place of origin: United Kingdom

Service history
- In service: 1887–1920
- Used by: Naval: United Kingdom Kingdom of Italy; Empire of Japan; Canada Field: United Kingdom; Canada; Union of South Africa; Australia Coastal defence: United Kingdom; United States; Canada
- Wars: First Sino-Japanese War; Second Boer War; World War I Italo-Turkish War; Second Italo-Ethiopian War; World War II

Production history
- Designer: Elswick Ordnance
- Designed: ca. 1885
- Manufacturer: Elswick Ordnance; Vickers Sons and Maxim
- No. built: 1,167
- Variants: Mark I, II, III, IV, VI

Specifications
- Mass: Barrel & breech 4,592 lb (Mk I–III); 4,704 lb (Mk IV)
- Barrel length: 15 ft 9 in (4.8 m)
- Crew: 10
- Shell: Separate loading QF; WWI : AP, Shrapnel, Common Lyddite, Common pointed, HE 45 pounds (20.41 kg) (Note: Various shell weights, both heavier and lighter than 45 pounds (20.4 kg), were tried. Early Mk I–IV Common Lyddite shells weighed 46 pounds 9 ounces (21.1 kg). Subsequent Mks V, VI, VII beginning October 1909, weighed 45 pounds (20.4 kg). Brassey's Naval Annual of 1894 Archived 7 June 2011 at the Wayback Machine quotes a 45-pound projectile, based on "List of Service Ordnance 1891, corrected by Official Card List 1892". Text Book of Gunnery 1902 only gives figures for 45 pounds (20.4 kg) projectiles. All shells used in the First World War are believed to be 45 pounds (20.4 kg). Sources: Hogg & Thurston 1972, Page 242; Treatise on Ammunition 10th Edition 1915, pages 45, 165, 170, 188, 217.)
- Calibre: 4.724 inches (120 mm)
- Breech: Single motion interrupted screw
- Recoil: 12 inches (305 mm) (carriage Mk I)
- Elevation: -6° – 20° (Mk I field carriage)
- Traverse: 0°
- Rate of fire: 5–6 rounds per minute
- Muzzle velocity: Gunpowder : 1,786 feet per second (544 m/s) (Note: The gun used gunpowder propellant when first introduced in the 1880s. Muzzle velocity was 1,786 feet per second (544 m/s) with 12 pounds (5.44 kg) "SP" (gunpowder) firing a 45 pounds (20.41 kg) projectile. "Instructions for 4.724-inch 120 mm Quick Firing Armstrong Gun and Automatic Centre Pivot Mounting", 1880s, Range Table.); Cordite : 2,150 feet per second (660 m/s)
- Maximum firing range: 10,000 yards (9,100 m) at 20°, 12,000 yards (11,000 m) at 24° (Note: 12,000 yds at 24° with 45 lb shell is quoted by Hall, December 1971. Tony Bridgland, Field Gun Jack versus the Boers (pages 7–8) quotes a range of 12,000 yards (11,000 m) being achieved at 24° in trials of the improvised field carriage at Simonstown in October 1899, and refers to The Times reporting this figure. 10,000 yards (9,100 m) at 20° in WWI is quoted by Hogg & Thurston page 111, referring to the maximum elevation of Mk I field carriage. Hogg & Thurston 1972 page 235 quote 11,800 yards (10,800 m) at 30° on CP (centre pintle mount) for the coast defence gun. Lighter and heavier shells were tried early in the gun's career, but by WWI 45 lb (20 kg) was the standard shell weight.)

The QF 4.7-inch gun Mks I, II, III, and IV (Note: Mk I = Mark 1, Mk II = Mark 2, Mk III = Mark 3, Mk IV = Mark 4. Britain used Roman numerals to denote marks (models) of ordnance until after the Second World War. Hence, these were the first four models of British QF 4.7-inch gun.) were a family of British quick-firing 4.724-inch (120 mm) naval and coast defence guns of the late 1880s and 1890s that served with the navies of various countries. They were also mounted on various wheeled carriages to provide the British Army with a long-range gun. They all had a barrel of 40 calibres length.

The gun was originally designed to replace the older BL 5-inch (127 mm) naval guns. It was optimised for the modern smokeless propellants, such as cordite, and could be loaded and fired far more rapidly than the BL 5-inch gun while firing a shell only slightly lighter.

== Design and development ==
The guns were designed and manufactured by the Elswick Ordnance Company, part of Armstrong Whitworth. They were developed to exploit the new "QF" technology, which involved loading the propellant charge in a brass case with integrated primer in its base. This allowed a faster rate of fire than the older "Breech Loading" system, where the propellant was loaded in cloth bags and then a separate friction or percussion tube fitted into the breech for firing. The brass case sealed the breech, allowing a lighter mechanism, and at the same time disposed with the necessity of washing or sponging any smouldering fragments left from the previous shot, which could ignite the charge (then of black powder) prematurely. The QF principle had proved successful with the much smaller QF 3 pounder Hotchkiss and Nordenfelt QF 3 and 6-pounders from 1885 onwards.

The first QF gun of this class was designated Pattern "M" in Elswick and was submitted to the Admiralty in 1886. Initially designed for a 36-pound (16 kg) projectile which was lengthened to 45 pounds (20 kg) after exhaustive experimentation, it was actually adopted not by the UK but by Italy as M1889 (see below).

They soon became a major export item and hence were actually of 4.724 inches (120mm) calibre to meet the requirements of metricised navies: 4.7 inch is an approximation used for the British designation. The guns, Mark I to Mark III, were Pattern P, Pattern Q and Pattern T respectively according to Elswick nomenclature. All three differed in detail of construction but were of the tube and hoop types. The Mark IV differed from these by incorporating a wire wound element to its construction. As first built, all used a three-motion screw breech, some were altered later by modifying the three-motion screw becoming "A" subtypes, or by fitting a single motion breech ("B" type). Army guns altered to use a bagged charge with a 3-inch steel (instead of the more usual brass) breech-sealing case were renumbered as Mark VI.

== United Kingdom service ==
=== Royal Navy service ===
British pre-dreadnoughts and cruisers of the period used these guns. Total production was 154 Mark I, 91 Mark II, 338 Mark III and 584 Mark IV. The Royal Navy received 776 of these guns directly. The Army transferred a further 110 to the Navy.

The Latona-class minelayer gave up their guns to produce high-angle anti-aircraft guns to defend London.

By the First World War, the guns were obsolete for warship use, but many were re-mounted on merchant ships and troopships for defence against enemy submarines and commerce raiders.

=== British Army service ===
In land service, limited numbers were mounted for use as fixed coast artillery. In addition, some Mark IV guns were mounted on converted 40-Pr Rifled Breech Loading Gun carriages for use by batteries of the Royal Garrison Artillery (Volunteers) from the early 1900s. The 1st Ayrshire and Galloway Royal Garrison Artillery (Volunteers) received a number of these guns in 1903 to provide armament for their three heavy batteries. These batteries were semi-mobile and equipped with limbers, which could be drawn by horses or gun tractors. They continued in use with artillery units of the Territorial Force, with some being used into the First World War.

=== Second Boer War (1899–1902) ===
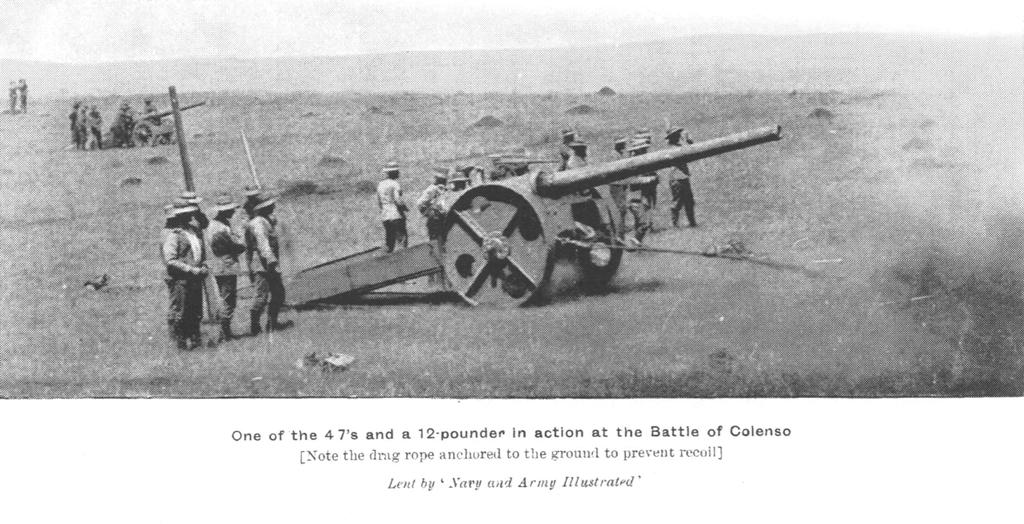
Gun on "Percy Scott" carriage at the Battle of Colenso

British forces in the Second Boer War were initially outgunned by the long range Boer artillery. Captain Percy Scott of HMS Terrible first improvised timber static siege mountings for two 4.7-inch (120 mm) guns from the Cape Town coastal defences, to counter the Boers' "Long Tom" gun during the Siege of Ladysmith in 1899–1900. Captain Scott then improvised a travelling carriage for 4.7-inch guns removed from their usual static coastal or ship mountings to provide the army with a heavy field gun. These improvised carriages lacked recoil buffers and hence in action drag shoes and attachment of the carriage by cable to a strong point in front of the gun were necessary to control the recoil. They were manned by Royal Navy crews and required up to 32 oxen to move.

=== First World War ===
==== South-West Africa Campaign (1914–1915) ====
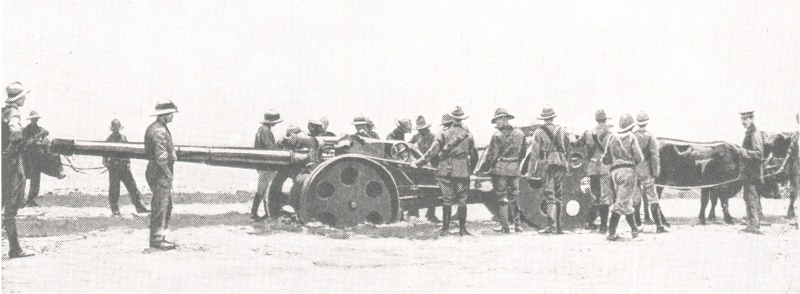
In sand, South West Africa campaign, WWI. Note oxen.

The same guns mounted on "Percy Scott" carriages were used by South African forces against German forces in the South-West Africa campaign in the First World War. Guns were landed at Lüderitz Bay in October 1914 and later at Walvis Bay in February 1915 and moved inland across the desert in support of South African troops.

==== Western Front (1914–1917) ====
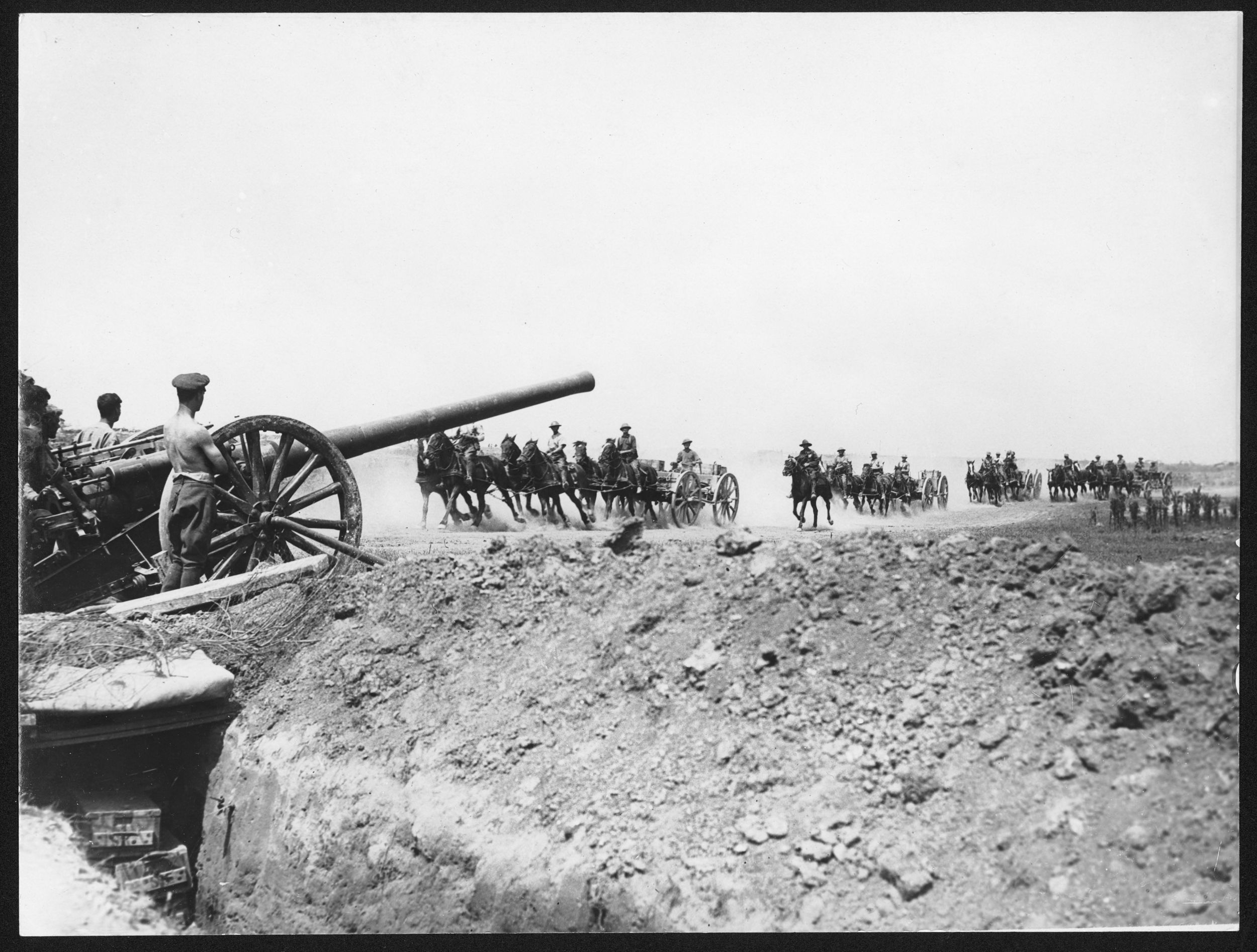
A gun on a Mk I "Woolwich" carriage, Sausage Valley, Somme 1916

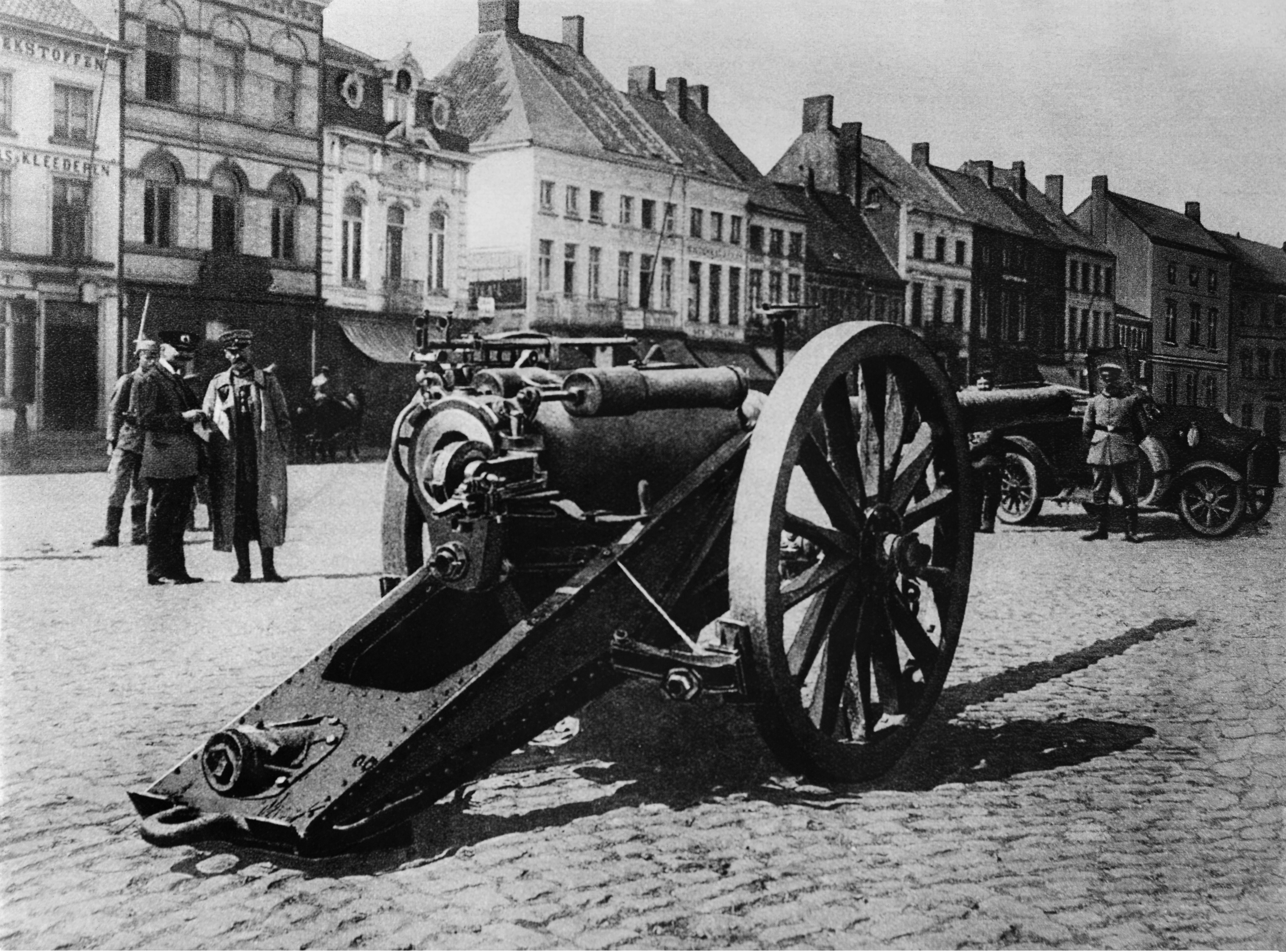
Germans with captured QF gun, on "Woolwich" carriage, in Belgium

Up to 92 QF 4.7-inch guns on more modern Mk I "Woolwich" carriages dating from June 1900 with partially effective (12-inch) recoil buffers, and on heavier "converted" carriages from old RML 40 pounder guns, went to France with Royal Garrison Artillery units, mostly of the Territorial Force, in 1914–1917.

They figured prominently in the early battles, such as at Neuve Chapelle in March 1915 where there were 32, and only 12 60-pounders, assigned to counter-battery fire. General Farndale reports that counter-battery fire there failed to deal with the German artillery, but ascribes the failure to the as yet imprecise nature of long range map shooting, and the difficulty of maintaining forward observers on the flat terrain.

By the Battle of Aubers Ridge on 9 May 1915, the barrels of the 28 guns of the 3rd and 8th Heavy Brigades and the 1st West Riding and 1st Highland Heavy Batteries engaged were now so worn that driving bands were stripped off shells at the muzzle, limiting accuracy. In addition, two guns in the armoured train "Churchill" were in action at Aubers Ridge. Thirty-three 60-pounders were available. Counter-battery fire again failed due to the inaccuracy of the worn-out guns and also because the army still lacked accurate means of locating enemy guns, as air observation and reporting and use of radio was only beginning.

The inaccuracy through wear and the relatively light shell diminished their usefulness in the developing trench warfare, and they were replaced by the modern 60-pounder guns as they became available. At the Battle of the Somme in June–July 1916, there were 32 4.7-inch guns and 128 60-pounders engaged. However, the last were not withdrawn until April 1917. Guns withdrawn from the Western Front were redeployed to other fronts, such as Italy and Serbia.

==== Battle of Gallipoli (1915) ====
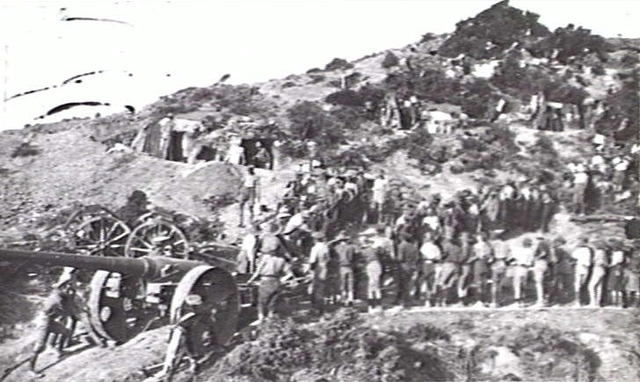
Dragging the gun up to its position at Anzac, July 1915

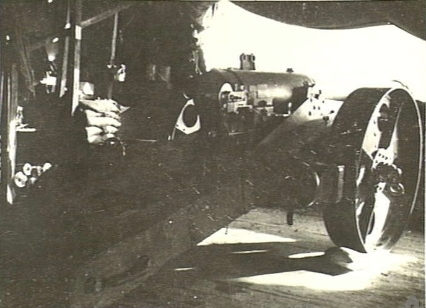
Gun in emplacement at Anzac, Gallipoli

A 4.7-inch gun was used by the 1st Heavy Artillery Battery, a joint unit of Australians and Royal Marines, on Gallipoli to counter long range Turkish fire from the "Olive Grove" (in fact "Palamut Luk" or Oak Grove) between Gaba Tepe and Maidos. Lt-Colonel Rosenthal, commanding 3rd Australian Field Artillery Brigade, noted: "I had made continual urgent representations for two 4.7-inch guns for right flank to deal with innumerable targets beyond the range of 18-prs., but it was not till 11 July that one very old and much worn gun arrived, and was placed in position on right flank, firing its first round on 26 July." This gun was destroyed and left behind at the withdrawal from Gallipoli but later salvaged as a museum piece. The burst barrel is on display at the Australian War Memorial.

==== Salonika front ====
Several 4.7-inch (120 mm) guns mounted on "Percy Scott" carriages served with British and Serb forces in the Salonika (Macedonian) campaign from January 1916 onwards.

== Italian service ==
In Italian service, QF 4.7-inch guns were known as 120/40 A 1889 and 120/40 A 1891. Italian guns produced under license by Ansaldo were similar in construction to the British Mk I*. They armed auxiliary cruisers, dreadnought battleships, ironclads, predreadnought battleships, protected cruisers and torpedo cruisers of the Regia Marina. They saw action aboard ships in the Italo-Turkish War, World War I, Second Italo-Ethiopian War and World War II.

== Japanese service ==
=== First Sino-Japanese War ===
Japanese belted cruiser Chiyoda launched in 1890 was armed with ten QF 4.7-inch Guns in single mounts, mounted one each in the bow and stern, and four on each side in sponsons. This was one of the first naval use of this gun. After Chiyoda, the Imperial Japanese Navy aggressively introduced quick-firing guns in their cruisers. Six Japanese cruisers that fought Battle of the Yalu River in 1894 had a total of 60 QF 4.7-inch guns. Along with eight QF 6-inch guns, overwhelming superiority in quick-firing guns of the Japanese Fleet gave it tactical advantage over the Chinese Beiyang Fleet and was one of the decisive factors of the Naval Battle.

=== Licensed products ===
The Japanese Type 41 4.7-inch/40 (12 cm) naval gun was a license-produced copy of the Elswick Mark IV. Initially, a number were procured directly from Elswick in England. After the turn of the century, production in Japan was under the designation "Mark IVJ". The gun was re-designated as Type 41 on 25 December 1908, after the 41st year in the reign of Japanese Emperor Meiji. It was further re-designated in centimeters on 5 October 1917 as part of the standardization process for the Imperial Japanese Navy to the metric system. Although finally classified as a "12 cm" gun the bore was unchanged at 4.724 inches.

During the First World War, the Japanese Navy transferred 24 original Elswick-built and 13 Mark IVJ to Britain as part of their military assistance to the Allies under the Anglo-Japanese Alliance. In 1940, some of these weapons were emplaced in British coastal defence batteries; for instance, at Mersea Island in Essex.

It was the standard secondary or tertiary armament on most Japanese cruisers built between 1900 and 1920, and was the primary armament on a number of destroyers, including the Umikaze class. Some units were still in service as late as the Pacific War.

== United States service ==
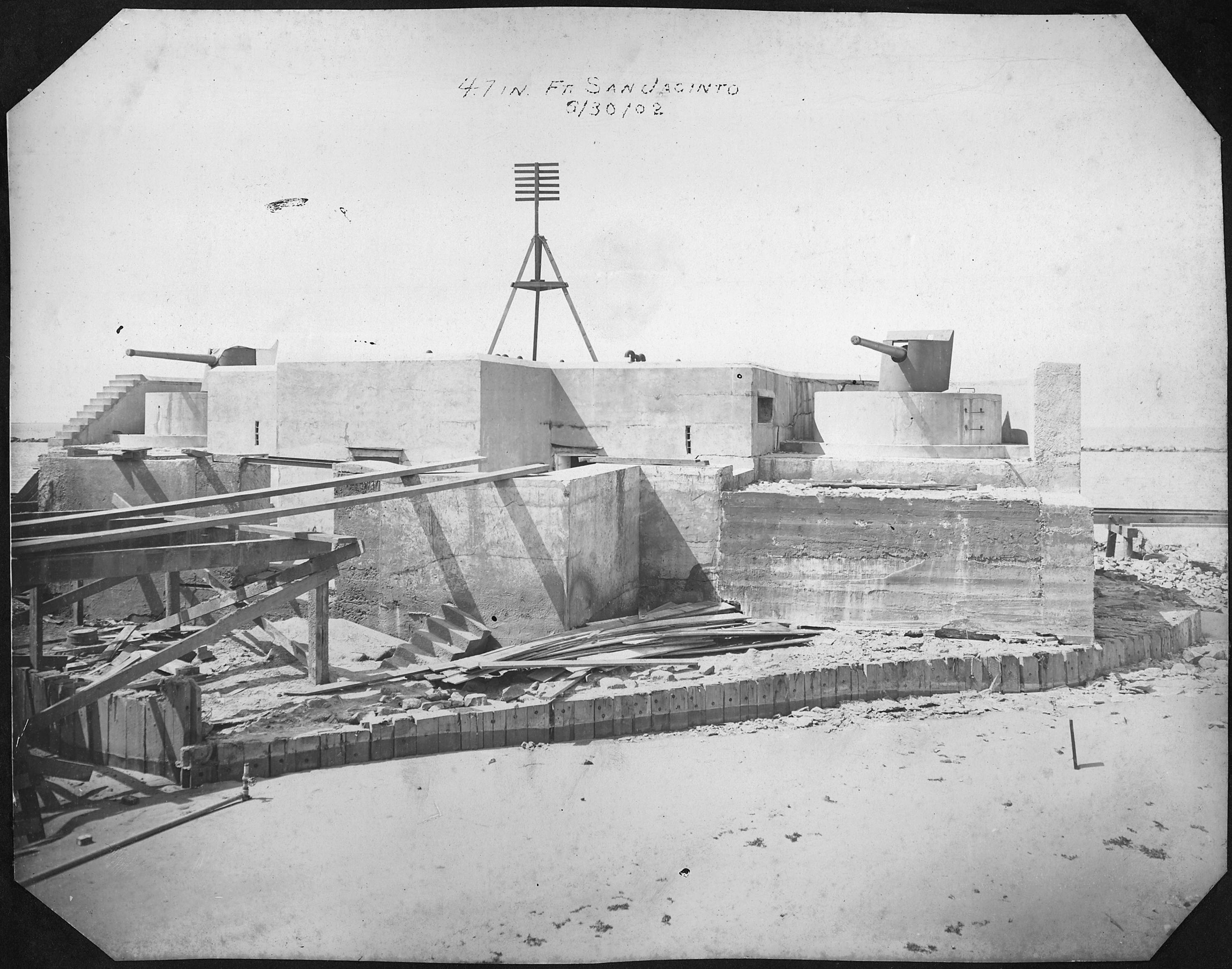
Battery Hogan under construction, Fort San Jacinto, Harbor Defenses of Galveston, Texas

In 1898, the United States Army acquired 35 British QF 4.7-inch guns; these were designated "4.72-inch Armstrong guns". Eighteen were 40 caliber Mark IV weapons, thirteen were 45 caliber, and four were 50 caliber; apparently the 45 and 50 caliber guns were non-standard export models. These and the nine 6-inch Armstrong guns acquired at the same time appear to have been purchased to rapidly arm coast defense batteries with modern quick-firing medium-caliber weapons due to the outbreak of the Spanish–American War. It was feared that the Spanish fleet might bombard US East Coast ports. The massive Endicott program of coast defenses was still years from completion, and most existing defenses dated from the 1870s with muzzle-loading weapons. By the end of 1899, 34 of the 4.7-inch guns had been deployed at 17 forts on the East and Gulf Coasts; the remaining gun (40 caliber) was retained for testing at the Sandy Hook Proving Ground at Fort Hancock, New Jersey.

The projectiles listed in US manuals for these weapons were a common cast iron practice round, a common steel explosive round, a strong-headed steel explosive round, and a shrapnel round with a time/percussion fuze, each 45 pounds (20 kg). The maximum ranges on mounts with 15-degree elevation were 8,312 yards (7,600 m) (40 caliber gun), 9,600 yards (8,800 m) (45 caliber gun), and 9,843 yards (9,000 m) (50 caliber gun). The 40 caliber gun used 7.5 pounds of nitrocellulose powder, while the 45 and 50 caliber guns used 10.5 pounds of nitrocellulose in a larger case.

The United States Navy acquired two protected cruisers in 1898 with four British-made export-model 4.7-inch 50 caliber guns each, along with a 6-inch main battery. These were under construction for Brazil at Elswick, and the US acquired them partly to prevent their purchase by Spain, renaming them as the New Orleans class. One source states the 6-inch guns were Elswick Pattern DD and the 4.7-inch guns were Pattern AA. Their guns were unique in the US Navy, and they were designated "4.7"/50 caliber Mark 3 Armstrong guns". During refits at the Cavite Navy Yard in the Philippines in 1903, both ships had their 4.7-inch guns replaced with standard USN 5-inch guns; the 6-inch guns followed in 1907. At least some of the guns from these ships were emplaced in the Grande Island/Subic Bay area 1907–1910 and operated by the United States Marine Corps Advanced Base Force until the Coast Artillery Corps' modern defenses centered on Fort Wint were completed. One gun each from USS New Orleans (CL-22) and USS Albany (CL-23) are preserved in Geneva, Illinois.

In 1913–1914, eight 4.7-inch 45 caliber guns were redeployed from the US to Fort Ruger and Fort Kamehameha in Hawaii, including two spares. The Endicott and Taft fortification programs were largely complete by this time, with most 4.7-inch guns superseded by 6-inch guns. The four 4.7-inch 50 caliber guns at Fort Monroe were placed in reserve in 1914, with one transferring to Sandy Hook for tests and the others stored at the Augusta Arsenal in Georgia.

The American entry into the war in 1917 saw more redeployment of 4.7-inch weapons. Eight Mark IV 40 caliber weapons from less-threatened forts were loaned to the Army Transport Service for the duration of hostilities and may have armed troop transports and cargo ships; they were returned in 1919 and promptly disposed of. Two Mark IV 40 caliber weapons were redeployed from Fort Strong in Boston Harbor to Sachuest Point in Middletown, Rhode Island. The three 50 caliber guns stored at Augusta, Georgia, were deployed to San Juan, Puerto Rico, at Fort Brooke, as Castillo San Felipe del Morro (often called "Morro Castle") was known at the time. Following the war, all 4.7-inch weapons were withdrawn from service by the end of 1920, and all were disposed of by 1927. Other weapons deployed in limited quantity were also retired during this period. 24 weapons were given to various cities and towns or retained in Hawaii as war memorials; only six survive. Most of the remainder were probably donated during Second World War scrap drives.

== Ammunition ==
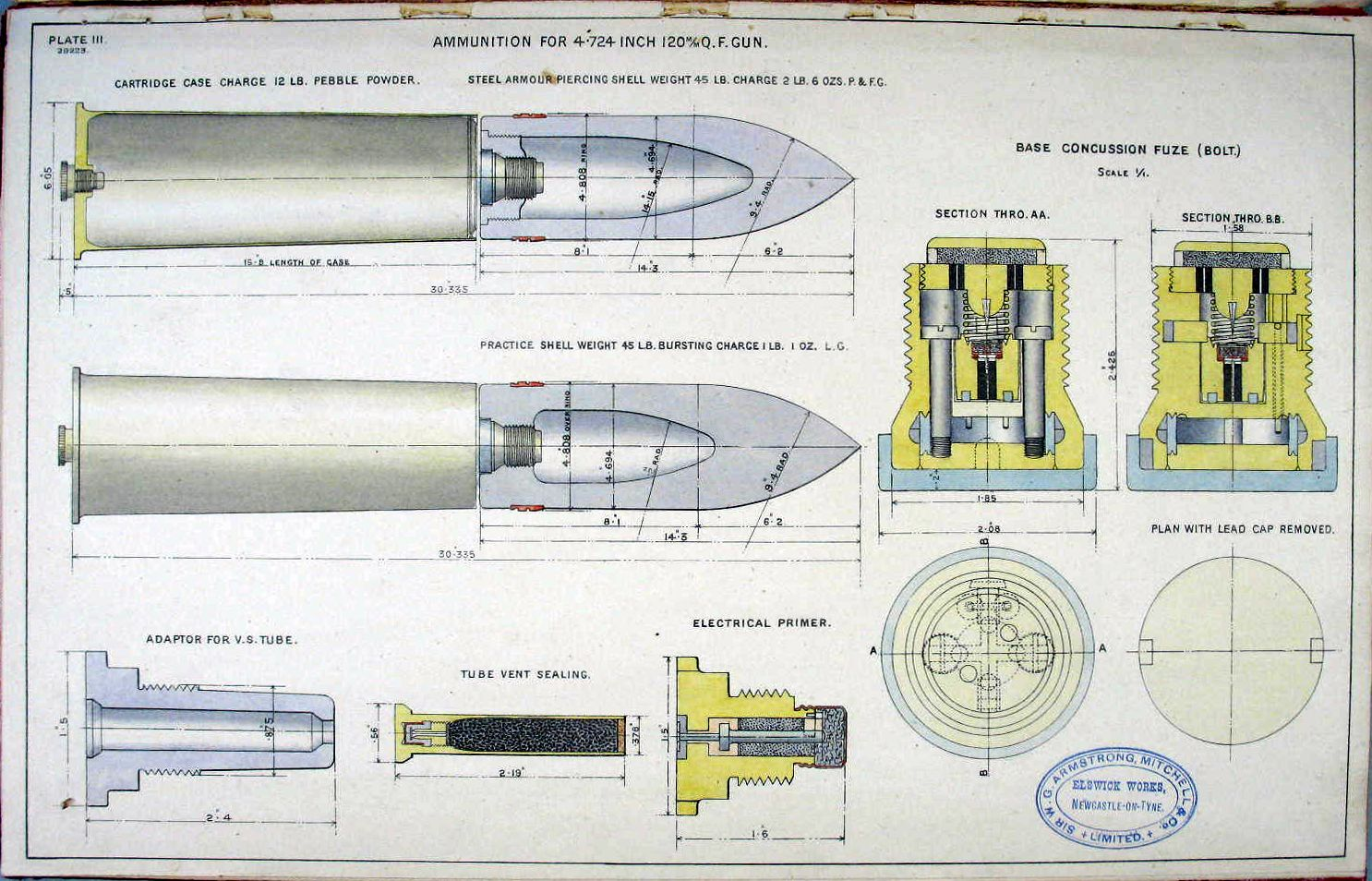
Armour piercing and practice rounds

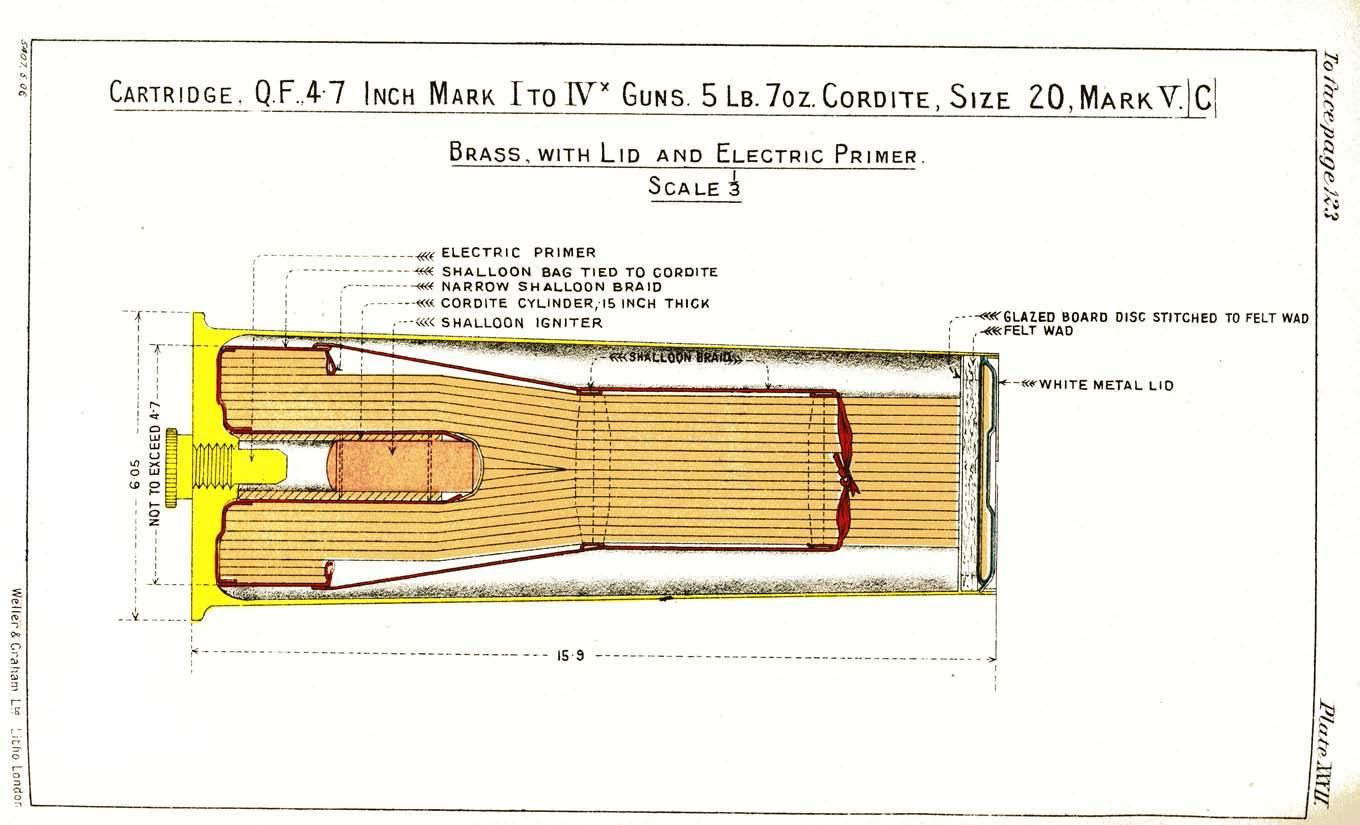
QF 4.7-inch gun cartridge diagram 1905

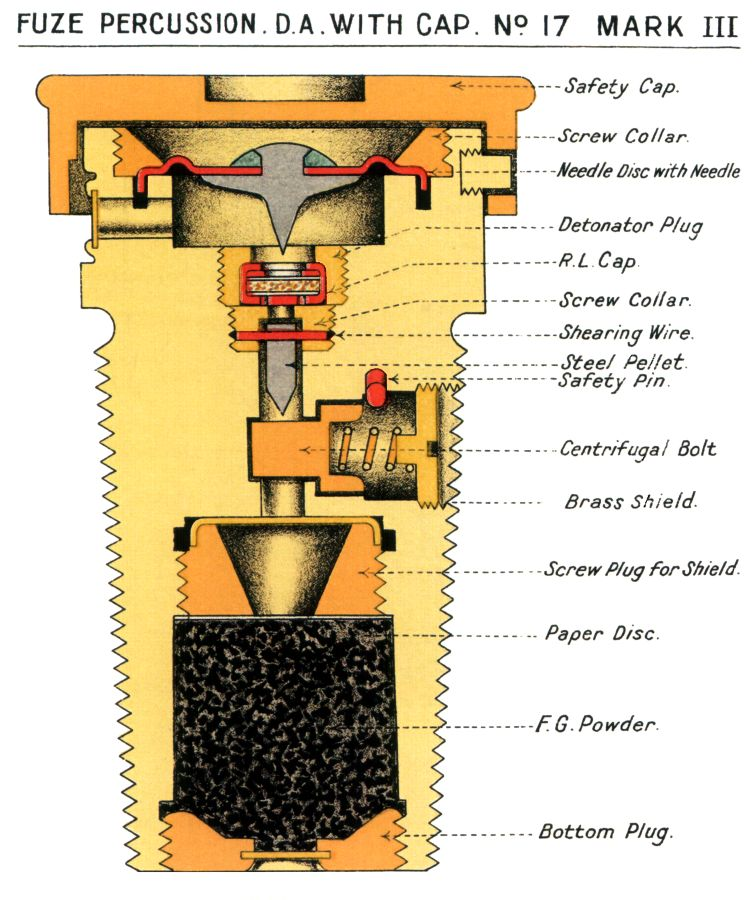
No. 17 Direct Action Fuze Mk III

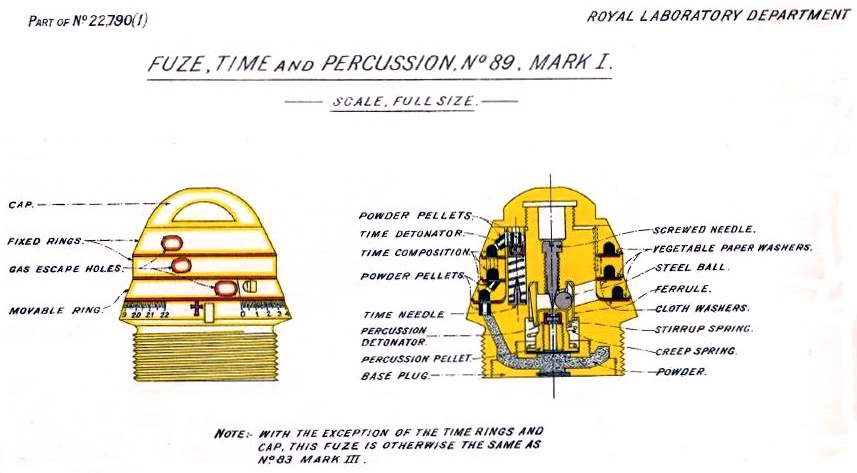
No. 89 Mk I Time & Percussion Fuze

Ammunition was of fixed QF type. A complete round weighed 20.4 kg (45 lb).

The gun was able to fire:

- Armor piercing
- Common
- Common pointed
- High explosive
- Illumination
- Shrapnel

== Surviving examples ==
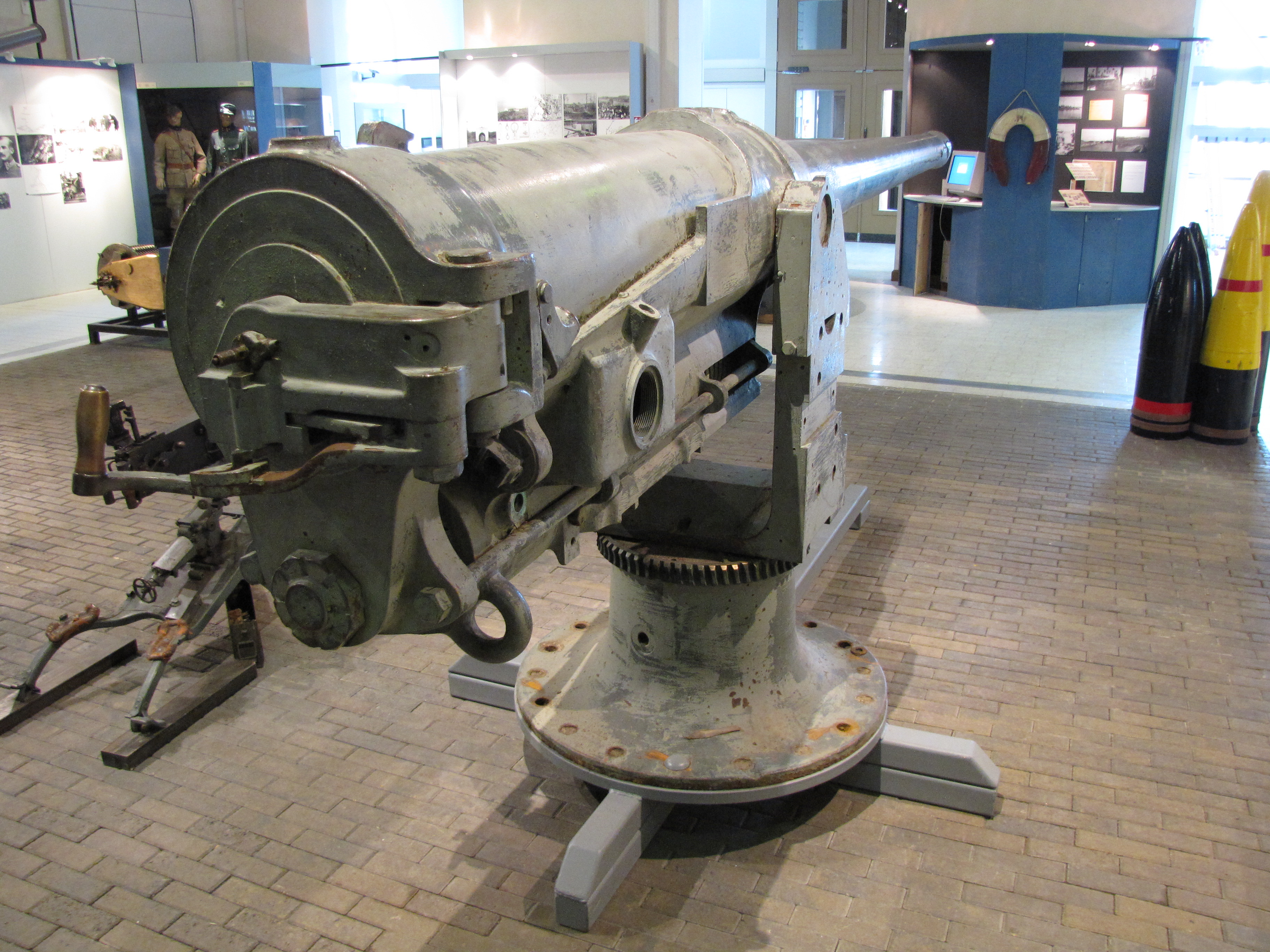
Japanese-built 4.7"/40 Mark IV in Manege Military Museum, Finland

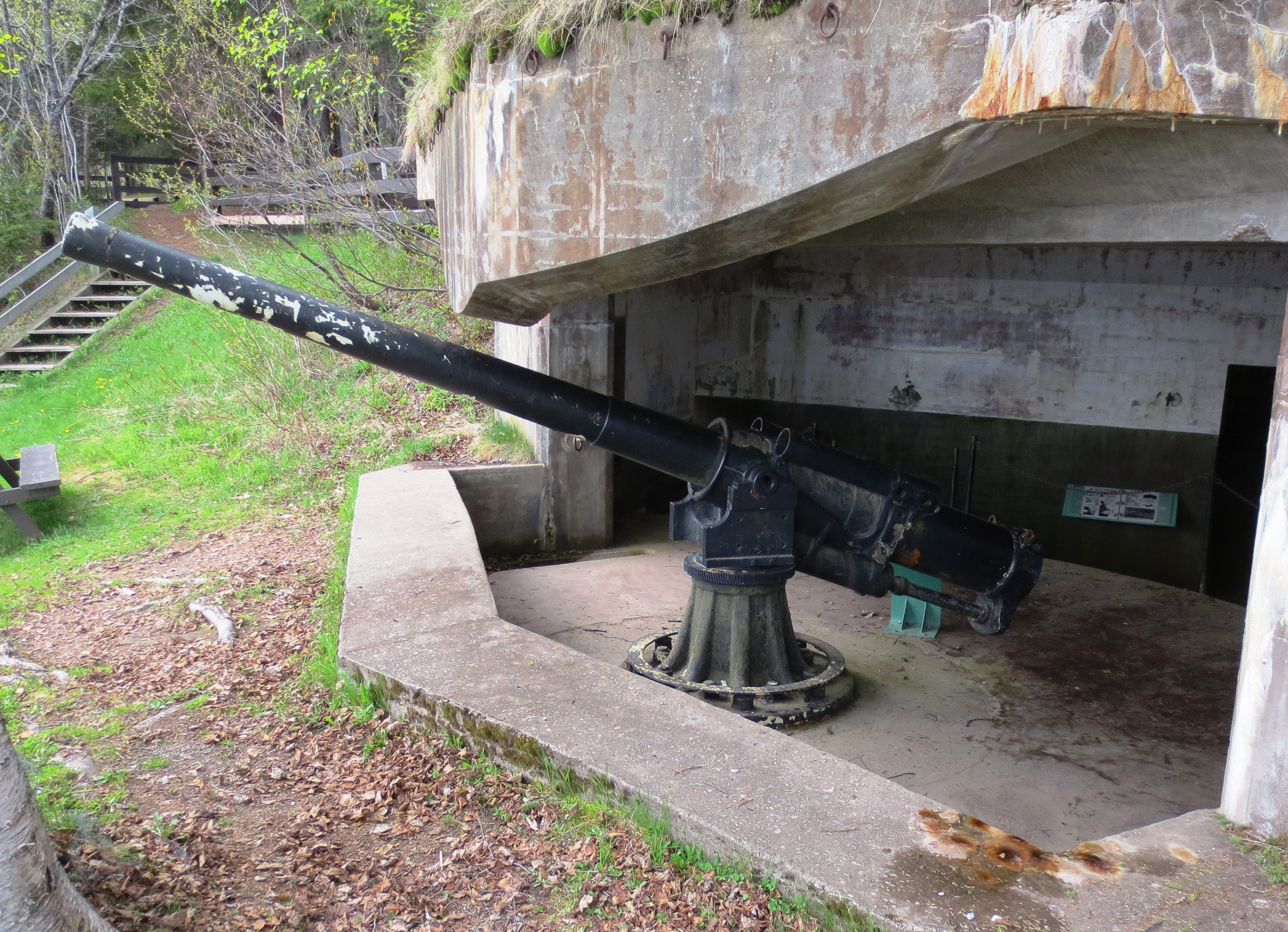
One of two surviving QF 4.7-inch B Mark IV* guns at Fort Péninsule, Forillon National Park, Quebec

- Preserved 4.7"/40 (12 cm) Mark IV*/VI on field carriage outdoors at Artillery Park, Valladolid, Spain
- The burst gun barrel from Gallipoli is displayed at the Australian War Memorial, Canberra
- Naval gun on display at the Museo Tecnico Navala Della Spezia, Italy
- Japanese-built 4.7"/40 Mark IV in the Military Museum of Finland in Suomenlinna, Finland
- 4.7-inch QF Gun, No. 563, Mark IV, manufactured in 1894 by Royal Gun Factory, on Percy Scott carriage, preserved in the courtyard of Indian Museum at Kolkata (Calcutta)
- 2 QF 4.7-inch B Mk IV* guns on central pivot mounts, Fort Amherst, St. John's, Newfoundland
- 2 QF 4.7-inch B Mk IV* guns on central pivot mounts, Bell Island, Newfoundland
- 2 QF 4.7-inch B Mk IV* guns on central pivot mounts, Fort Peninsula, Quebec
- 1 QF 4.7-inch B Mk IV* gun on central pivot mount, Fort Prevel, Quebec (upside down on mount with shield attached backwards)
- QF 4.7-inch Mk IV Armstrong No. 12123 on central pivot mount Mk 1 No. 10981 (Formerly emplaced at Battery Talbot, Fort Adams, Rhode Island), location: Equality Park, Newport, RI
- QF 4.7-inch Mk IV Armstrong No. 12124 on central pivot mount Mk 1 No. 10982 (Formerly emplaced at Battery Talbot, Fort Adams, Rhode Island), location: Battery Bingham, Fort Moultrie, Sullivan's Island, South Carolina (shield missing)
- QF 4.7-inch Mk IV Armstrong No. 11856 on central pivot mount Mk 1 No. 10842 (Formerly emplaced at Battery Drum, Fort Strong, Massachusetts), location: State Armory, Main Street, Ansonia, Connecticut
- QF 4.7-inch Mk IV Armstrong No. 9718 on central pivot mount Mk 1 No. 10841 (Formerly emplaced at Battery Van Swearingen, Fort Pickens, Florida), location: County Courthouse, Danielsville, Georgia
- QF 4.7-inch Armstrong 45 calibre No. 11933 (formerly emplaced at Battery Dodge, Fort Ruger, Hawaii), location: State Armory, Wahiawa, Oahu, Hawaii (upside down resting on shield top)
- QF 4.7-inch Armstrong 45 calibre No. 11009 (formerly emplaced at Battery Dodge, Fort Ruger), location: State Armory, Wahiawa, Oahu, Hawaii (upside down resting on shield top)
- QF 4.7-inch/50 calibre Mark 3 Armstrong (US Navy designation) (From USS New Orleans (CL-22)), location: Kane County, Illinois, Soldier and Sailor Monument at former courthouse, Geneva, Illinois
- QF 4.7-inch/50 calibre Mark 3 Armstrong (US Navy designation) (From USS Albany (CL-23)), location: Kane County, Illinois, Soldier and Sailor Monument at former courthouse, Geneva, Illinois

== See also ==
- QF 4.7-inch Mk V naval gun – 45-calibre version used on merchant ships in both world wars.
- List of naval guns
- List of field guns

=== Weapons of comparable role, performance and era ===
- 4.7-inch gun M1906, US field gun of same calibre

== Bibliography ==
- Text Book of Gunnery, 1902. London: Printed for His Majesty's Stationery Office, by Harrison and Sons, St. Martin's Lane
- Handbook of the Q.F. 4.7-inch B (Mark IV*) Gun, on travelling carriage. For Volunteer Batteries. Land Service, 1902. London: Printed for His Majesty's Stationery Office, by Harrison and Sons, St. Martin's Lane
- Berhow, Mark A., ed. (2004). American Seacoast Defenses, A Reference Guide (Second ed.). CDSG Press. ISBN 978-0-9748167-0-8.
- Tony Bridgland, Field Gun Jack Versus the Boers: The Royal Navy in South Africa 1899–1900. Leo Cooper, 1998. ISBN 0-85052-580-2.
- Campbell, John (1985). Naval Weapons of World War Two. Annapolis, Maryland: Naval Institute Press. ISBN 0-87021-459-4.
- Dale Clarke, British Artillery 1914–1919: Field Army Artillery. Osprey Publishing, Oxford UK, 2004. ISBN 1-84176-688-7.
- Tony DiGiulian, 4.7"/40 (12 cm) Elswick 4.7"/40 (12 cm) QF Marks I, II, III, IV and VI
- General Sir Martin Farndale, History of the Royal Regiment of Artillery. [New Series. Vol.1] Western Front 1914–18. London: Royal Artillery Institution, 1986. ISBN 1-870114-00-0.
- Friedman, Norman (2011). Naval Weapons of World War One: Guns, Torpedoes, Mines and ASW Weapons of All Nations; An Illustrated Directory. Barnsley, UK: Seaforth Publishing. ISBN 978-1-84832-100-7.
- Major Darrell Hall, "Guns in South Africa 1899–1902 Part III and IV". South African Military History Society, Military History Journal, Vol 2 No 2, December 1971.
- Major Darrell Hall, "The Naval Guns in Natal 1899–1902". The South African Military History Society Military History Journal, Vol 4 No 3, June 1978.
- I.V. Hogg & L.F. Thurston, British Artillery Weapons & Ammunition 1914–1918. London: Ian Allan, 1972.
- Mallett, Ross (1999). "2. Gallipoli". MA Thesis (Thesis). Archived from the original on 22 February 2011.
- Ross Mallett, AIF Artillery. updated 2005
- Preston, Antony (1985). "Great Britain and Empire Forces". In Gray, Randal (ed.). Conway's All the World's Fighting Ships 1906–1921. Annapolis, Maryland: Naval Institute Press. pp. 1–104. ISBN 0-85177-245-5.
- Lieut.-Colonel Charles Rosenthal, Commanding 3rd Australian Field Artillery Brigade, 1st Australian Division, Notes relating to Artillery at Anzac, from 25 April to 25 August 1915. (Compiled from personal diary.) Appendix II in General Sir Ian Hamilton, G.C.B. Gallipoli Diary Vol. II. New York: George H. Doran Company, 1920.
- Admiral Percy Scott, Fifty Years in the Royal Navy, published 1919.
- "Instructions for 4.724-inch 120 mm Quick Firing Armstrong Gun and Automatic Centre Pivot Mounting", 1880s, as supplied to Australian colonies. From National Archives of Australia.
