= Umikaze-class destroyer =

World War I destroyer class

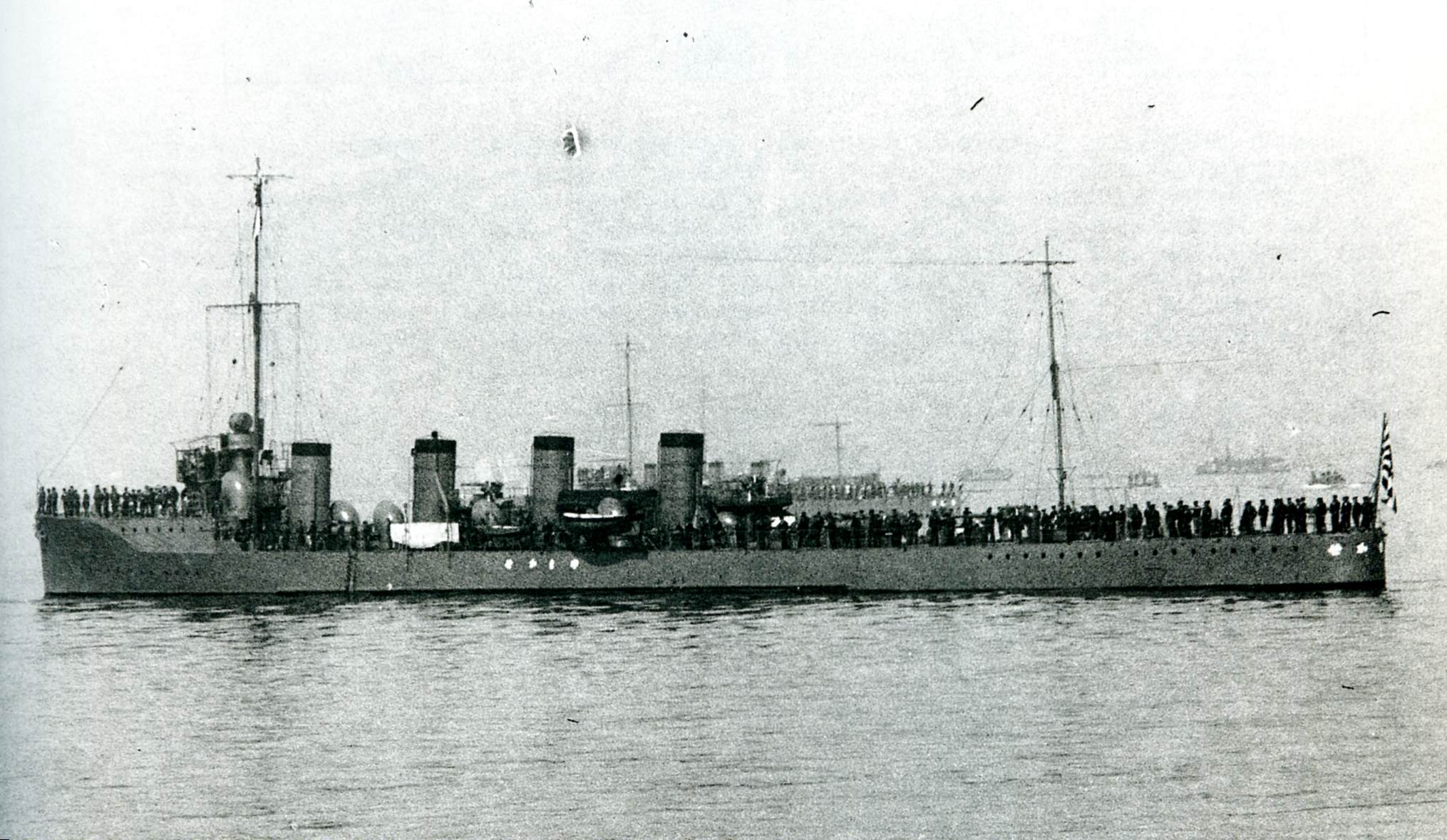
- Yamakaze at Ominato, 1926

Class overview
- Name: Umikaze class
- Builders: Maizuru Naval Arsenal (1); Mitsubishi Shipyards; Nagasaki Shipyard (1)
- Operators: Imperial Japanese Navy
- Preceded by: Kamikaze class
- Succeeded by: Sakura class
- In commission: 28 September 1911 — 1 June 1930
- Completed: 2
- Retired: 2

General characteristics
- Type: Destroyer
- Displacement: 1,030 long tons (1,047 t) normal, 1,150 long tons (1,168 t)
- Length: 94.5 m (310 ft) pp, 98.5 m (323 ft) o/a
- Beam: 8.6 m (28 ft)
- Draught: 2.7 m (8.9 ft)
- Propulsion: 3-shaft Parsons steam turbine, 8 boilers, 20,500 ihp (15,300 kW)
- Speed: 33 knots (61 km/h)
- Range: 850 nmi (1,570 km) at 11 kn (20 km/h)
- Complement: 141
- Armament: 2 × 120 mm/40 cal guns; 5 × 80 mm/40 cal guns; 2 × 450 mm torpedoes

The Umikaze-class destroyers (海風型駆逐艦, Umikazegata kuchikukan) were a class of two destroyers of the Imperial Japanese Navy. They were the first large destroyers designed for open ocean service to be built in Japan.

== Background ==
The Umikaze-class destroyers were designed after the Russo-Japanese War, as the Imperial Japanese Navy realized that the vessels in its current fleet of destroyers were too small and poorly designed for extended "blue water" operation.

Two vessels were built, based largely on British designs, one at Maizuru Naval Arsenal and the other at the Mitsubishi shipyards in Nagasaki.

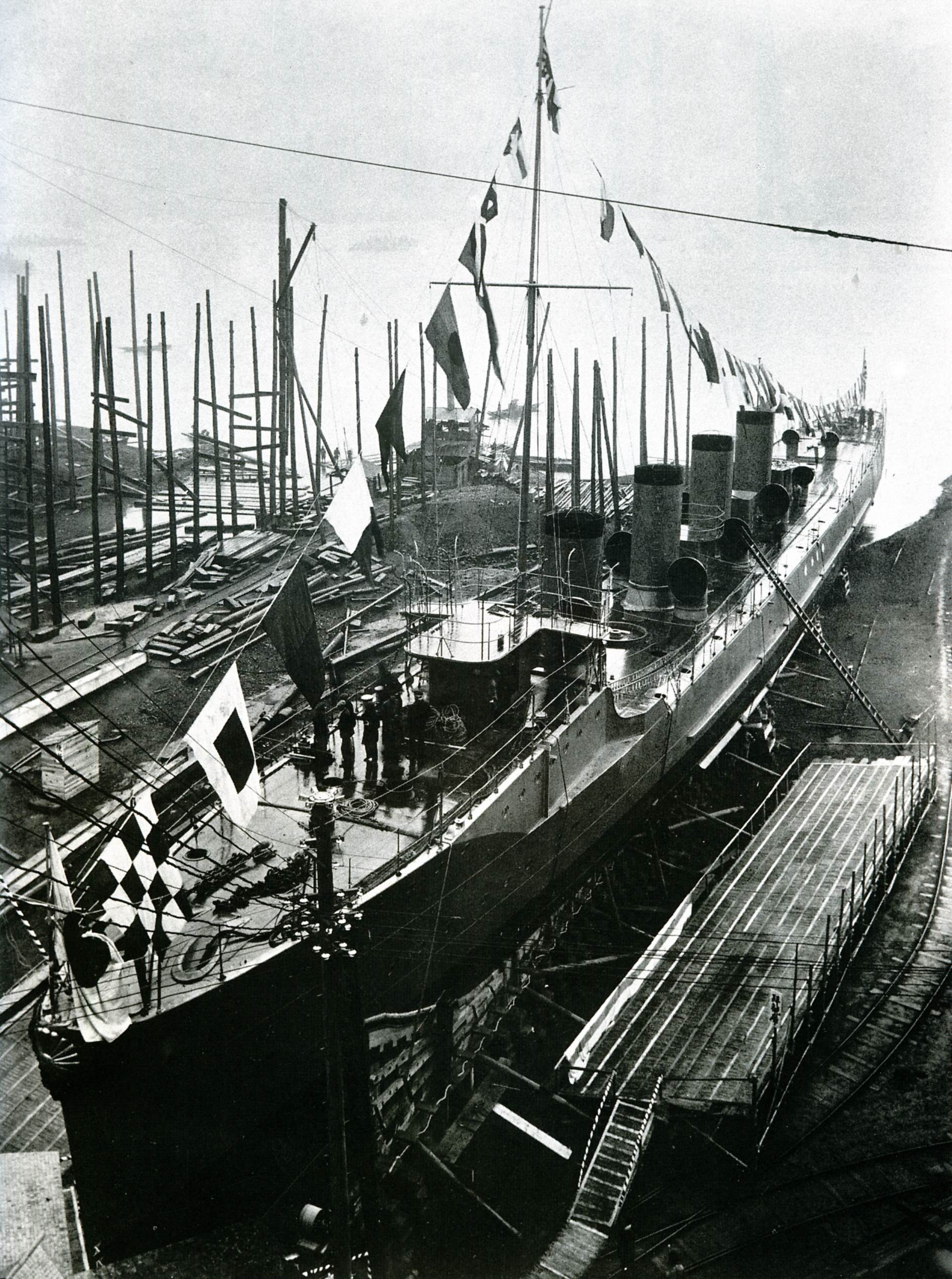
Yamakaze launch at Mitsubishi Nagasaki, 1911

== Design ==
The Umikaze-class ships were based largely on the Royal Navy Tribal-class destroyers. In terms of displacement, each vessel was almost three times larger than the previous destroyers in the Japanese Navy.

Externally, the design retained the four-smokestacks of the Ikazuchi class, however, internally the coal-fired triple expansion steam engines, were replaced with heavy oil-fired Parsons steam turbine engines, which was a first for Japan. The rated power of 20,500 shp gave the vessels a high speed of 33 knots (61 km/h), however fuel consumption severely limited range.

Armament was increased over the previous classes, with a pair of QF 4.7 inch Gun Mk I - IV guns, with one gun mounted on the small forecastle forward of the bridge and another on the quarterdeck and five QF 3 inch 12 pounder guns mounted staggered to port and starboard. The number of torpedoes was initially three in unreloadable tubes; but this was quickly changed to two in reloadable tubes in operational service.

== Operational history ==
The Umikaze-class destroyers proved to be largely experimental ships. The use of Parsons steam turbines pushed the design to the limits of capability of contemporary engineering and production technology, and the engines were plagued with maintenance issues, as well as tremendous fuel consumption. In an effort to reduce running expenses and to increase range, the boilers were modified from all heavy oil to two heavy oil and four coal-fired boilers. Even with the modification, the Umikaze vessels were largely retained for coastal patrol duties.

The Umikaze ships were rated at first-class destroyers on 28 August 1912, and served to 1 June 1930 when both were converted to minesweepers. Both were subsequently scrapped in 1936.

== Ships ==
Construction data
Kanji	Name (translation)	Builder	Laid down	Launched	Completed	Fate
海風	Umikaze "Seawind"	Maizuru Naval Arsenal	23 November 1909	10 October 1910	28 September 1911	Minesweeper W-7, 1 June 1930; Scrapped, 1 April 1936
山風	Yamakaze "Mountain Wind"	Mitsubishi shipyards, Nagasaki	1 June 1910	21 January 1911	21 October 1911	Minesweeper W-8, 1 June 1930; Scrapped, 1 April 1936
