= List of naval guns by country =

List of Naval Guns, listed below by country of origin in decreasing caliber size:

== Argentina ==
- 12"/50 caliber gun
- 7.5"/52 caliber gun
- EOC 10 inch 40 caliber
- EOC 15 inch 55 caliber

== Austria-Hungary ==
- Škoda 35 cm K14
- Škoda 30.5 cm /45 K10
- Škoda 24 cm L/40 K97
- Škoda 19 cm vz. 1904
- Škoda 15 cm K10
- Škoda 10 cm K10
- Škoda 7 cm K10
- Škoda 7 cm guns

== Brazil ==
- EOC 12 inch/45 naval gun

== China ==
- H/PJ-26 76 mm naval gun
- Type 79 100 mm naval gun
- H/PJ-38 130mm naval gun

== Chile ==
- EOC 8 inch 40 caliber
- EOC 8 inch 45 caliber
- 9.4 in/35 caliber Canet guns
- EOC 14-inch 45-calibre naval gun

== France ==
- 380 mm Model 1935 naval gun
- 340 mm Model 1912 naval gun
- 340 mm Model 1881 naval gun
- 330 mm Model 1931 naval gun
- 305 mm Model 1910 naval gun
- 305 mm Model 1906 naval gun
- 305 mm Model 1893 naval gun
- 305 mm Model 1887 naval gun
- 274 mm modèle 1887/1893 naval gun
- 274 mm modèle 1893/1896 naval gun
- 240 mm Model 1902 naval gun
- 203 mm Model 1931 naval gun
- 203 mm Model 1924 naval gun
- 194 mm Model 1902 naval gun
- 194 mm Model 1893 naval gun
- 194 mm Model 1887 naval gun
- 164 mm Model 1884 naval gun
- 164 mm Model 1893 naval gun
- 155 mm Model 1920 naval gun
- 152 mm Model 1930 naval gun
- 138 mm Model 1888 naval gun
- 138 mm Model 1893 naval gun
- 138 mm Model 1910 naval gun
- 138 mm Model 1923 naval gun
- 138 mm Model 1927 naval gun
- 138 mm Model 1929 naval gun
- 138 mm Model 1934 naval gun
- 130 mm Model 1932 and 1935 naval gun
- 130 mm Model 1930 naval gun
- 130 mm Model 1924 naval gun
- 130 mm Model 1919 naval gun
- 100 mm Model 1891 naval gun
- French 100 mm naval gun
- 90 mm Model 1926 naval gun
- 75 mm Model 1924 naval gun
- Canon de 65 mm Modèle 1891
- Canon Hotchkiss à tir rapide de 47 mm
- Paixhans guns

== Germany ==
- 40.6 cm SK C/34 Naval gun - also known as the Adolf gun, Intended for the H-class battleships which were never completed. Used as coastal artillery.
- 38 cm SK C/34 naval gun - World War II Bismarck-class battleship
- 38 cm SK L/45 naval gun - World War I Bayern-class battleship
- 30.5 cm SK L/50 gun - World War I
- 28 cm SK C/34 naval gun - World War II Scharnhorst-class battleship
- 28 cm SK C/28 naval gun - World War II Deutschland-class cruiser
- 28 cm SK L/50 gun - World War I
- 28 cm SK L/45 gun - World War I
- 28 cm SK L/40 gun - World War I
- 28 cm MRK L/40 - World War I
- 28 cm MRK L/35 - World War I
- 24 cm SK L/40 gun - World War I
- 24 cm K L/35 gun - World War I
- 21 cm SK L/45 gun - World War I
- 21 cm SK L/40 gun - World War I
- 21 cm L/35 gun - World War I
- 20.3 cm SK C/34 naval gun - World War II
- 17 cm SK L/40 gun - World War I
- MONARC - modern 155 mm artillery system
- 15 cm SK C/36 naval gun - World War II
- 15 cm TbtsK C/36 naval gun - World War II
- 15 cm SK C/28 - World War II
- 15 cm SK C/25 - World War II
- 15 cm UToF L/45 - World War I
- 15 cm SK L/45 naval gun - World War I
- 15 cm SK L/40 naval gun - World War I
- 15 cm SK L/35 naval gun - World War I
- 12.7 cm SK C/34 naval gun - World War II
- 10.5 cm SK C/33 - World War II
- 10.5 cm SK C/32 naval gun - World War II
- 10.5 cm SK L/45, SK C/06, Flak L/45, Tbts L/45, Ubts L/45 - World War I and II
- 10.5 cm SK L/40 naval gun - World War I
- 10.5 cm SK L/35 - World War I
- 8.8 cm SK L/45, Flak L/45, Tbts KL/45 - World War I
- 8.8 cm SK L/35 - World War I
- 8.8 cm SK L/30 - World War I
- 8.8 cm SK C/30 naval gun - World War II
- 8.8 cm SK C/31 naval gun - World War II
- 8.8 cm SK C/32 naval gun - World War II
- 8.8 cm SK C/35 naval gun - World War II
- 5.2 cm SK L/55 gun - World War I
- 5 cm SK L/40 gun - World War I
- 3.7 cm SK C/30 - World War II
- 2 cm FlaK 30/38/Flakvierling - World War II

== India ==
- CRN 91 Naval Gun

== Italy ==
- Cannone da 381/50 Ansaldo M1934
- 381mm / 40 Model 1914 naval gun
- 320 mm Model 1934 naval gun
- 305 mm /46 Model 1909
- 254 mm /45 Model 1908 naval gun
- Cannone da 254/40 A
- 203 mm /53 Italian naval gun
- 203 mm /50 Italian naval gun
- Cannone da 190/45
- 152 mm /55 Italian naval gun Models 1934 and 1936
- 152 mm /53 Italian naval gun Models 1926 and 1929
- 135 mm /45 Italian naval gun
- Cannon 152/32 Model 1887
- Otobreda 127/54 Compact
- 120 mm Italian naval gun
- Cannon 102/35 Model 1914
- Cannon 102/45
- OTO 100 mm /47
- Cannone da 76/45 S 1911
- Cannon 76/40 Model 1916
- Otobreda 76 mm

== Japan ==
- 46 cm/45 Type 94 - Japanese 46 cm gun mounted in the Yamato-class battleships.
- 41 cm/45 3rd Year Type - Japanese 41 cm gun mounted in the Nagato-class battleships.
- 14"/36 cm/45 41st Year Type - Japanese 35.6 cm gun used on the Ise-, Fusō- and Kongō-class battleships.
- Type 41 12-inch 45 caliber naval gun
- Type 41 12-inch (305 mm)/40-caliber naval gun
- Type 41 10 inch 45 caliber naval gun
- 10 in/40 Type 41 naval gun
- 20 cm/50 3rd year Type No.2 - gun used on heavy cruisers.
- 20 cm/50 3rd year Type No.1 - gun used on older heavy cruisers and aircraft carriers Akagi and Kaga.
- Type 41 8-inch (203 mm)/45-caliber naval gun
- 15.5 cm/60 3rd Year Type - gun used on the Yamato-class battleships and on the light cruiser Ōyodo.
- 15 cm/50 41st Year Type - gun used on the Kongō- and Fusō-class battleships and on Agano-class cruisers.
- 15 cm/45 41st Year Type
- Type 41 6-inch (152 mm)/40-caliber naval gun
- 14 cm/50 3rd Year Type naval gun - Gun used on light cruisers.
- 14 cm/40 11th Year Type naval gun - Gun used on submarine cruisers.
- 12.7 cm/50 Model A Type 3 - Fubuki-class destroyer Model I.
- 12.7 cm/50 Model B Type 3 - Fubuki-class destroyer Model II, III and Chidori-class torpedo boats.
- 12.7 cm/50 Model C Type 3 - Kagero-class destroyer, Asashio-class destroyer, and Shiratsuyu-class destroyer.
- 12.7 cm/50 Model D Type 3 - Yūgumo-class destroyer and Shimakaze.
- 12.7 cm/40 Type 89 naval gun - gun used on almost all Japanese ships cruiser size and larger, Matsu and Tachibana-class escorts.
- 12 cm/45 10th Year Type naval gun Anti-aircraft gun used in older carriers and some cruisers.
- Type 41 4.7 inch 40 caliber naval gun
- Type 3 120 mm 45 caliber naval gun - Gun used on older destroyers.
- 10 cm/65 Type 98 naval gun - Akizuki-class destroyer , aircraft carrier Taihō, Ōyodo.
- 8 cm/60 Type 98 naval gun - Anti-aircraft gun used on Agano-class cruisers.
- 8 cm/40 3rd Year Type naval gun - Anti-aircraft gun used on many Japanese ships built between 1910 and 1930.
- Type 41 3-inch (7.62 cm)/40-caliber naval gun
- Type 96 25 mm AT/AA Gun - gun used on almost all Japanese warships of World War II.

== Russia / Soviet Union ==
- 406 mm M1937 Soviet naval gun
- 356 mm M1913 Russian naval gun
- 305 mm M1948 Soviet naval gun
- 305 mm M1940 Soviet naval gun
- Obukhovskii 12"/52 Pattern 1907 gun
- Obukhovskii 12"/40 Pattern 1895 gun
- 254mm 45 caliber Pattern 1891
- 203 mm 50 caliber Pattern 1905
- 203mm 45 caliber Pattern 1892
- 180mm Pattern 1931-1933
- 152 mm 45 caliber Pattern 1892
- 6 inch 35 caliber naval gun 1877
- AK-130
- 130 mm M1957 Soviet naval gun
- 130 mm/55 B7 Pattern 1913 naval gun
- 130 mm/50 B13 Pattern 1936 130 mm gun from the 1940s used in the B-2LM turret
- 120 mm 50 caliber Pattern 1905
- 120mm 45 caliber Pattern 1892
- 102mm 60 caliber Pattern 1911
- AK-100 Naval gun
- AK-176
- AK-726
- 75mm 50 caliber Pattern 1892
- AK-725 (ru)

== Spain ==
- Gonzalez Hontoria de 32 cm mod 1883
- Gonzalez Hontoria de 28 cm mod 1883
- Gonzalez Hontoria de 16 cm mod 1883
- Gonzalez Hontoria de 14 cm mod 1883
- Gonzalez Hontoria de 12 cm mod 1883

== Sweden ==
- Bofors 283 mm gun
- Bofors 254 mm gun
- Bofors 152 mm gun
- Bofors 120 mm gun
- Bofors 57 mm gun
- Bofors 40 mm gun

== Switzerland ==
- Oerlikon 20 mm cannon

== United Kingdom ==
- BL 18 inch Mk I naval gun
- BL 18 in / 45 naval gun, planned for the N3-class battleship
- RML 17.72 inch gun
- BL 16.25 inch Mk I naval gun
- BL 16 inch Mk I naval gun
- RML 16 inch 80 ton gun
- BL 15 inch Mk I naval gun
- BL 14 inch Mk VII naval gun
- EOC 14 inch /45 Marks I and III
- BL 13.5 inch Mk V naval gun
- BL 13.5 inch Mk I-IV
- RML 12.5 inch 38 ton gun
- BL 12 inch Mark XIII
- BL 12 inch Mk XI, Mark XII
- BL 12 inch Mk X naval gun
- BL 12 inch Mark IX
- BL 12 inch naval gun Mk VIII
- RML 12 inch 35 ton gun
- EOC 12 inch /45
- RML 11 inch 25 ton gun
- RML 10 inch 18 ton gun
- BL 10 inch Mk I-IV
- Vickers 10 inch /45 naval gun
- EOC 10 inch /45 naval gun
- EOC 10 inch 40 caliber
- RML 9 inch 12 ton gun
- BL 9.2 inch naval gun Mk VIII
- BL 9.2 inch Mk XI
- BL 9.2 inch gun Mk IX–X
- BL 9.2 inch gun Mk I–VII
- BL 8 inch Mk VIII naval gun
- BL 8 inch Mk I-VII naval gun
- ML 8 inch shell gun
- EOC 8 inch 45 caliber
- EOC 8 inch 40 caliber
- RML 8 inch 9 ton gun
- BL 7.5-inch naval howitzer
- BL 7.5-inch Mk II–V naval gun
- BL 7.5 inch Mk VI naval gun
- BL 7.5 inch Mk I naval gun
- RML 7 inch gun
- RBL 7 inch Armstrong gun
- BL 6 inch Mk VII naval gun
- BL 6 inch Mk XXIII naval gun
- BL 6 inch Mk XXII naval gun
- BL 6 inch naval guns Mk XIII – XVIII
- BL 6 inch Mk XII naval gun
- BL 6 inch Mk XI naval gun
- BL 6 inch Mk VII
- BL 6 inch gun Mk II-VI
- BL 6 inch 80 pounder gun
- BL 6 inch / 45 naval gun
- QF 6 inch Mark N5 gun
- QF 6 inch /40 naval gun
- BL 5.5 inch Mark I naval gun
- QF 5.25 inch Mark I naval gun
- BL 5 inch gun Mk I - V
- BL 4.7 inch /45 naval gun Mk I, Mk II
- QF 4.7 inch naval gun
- QF 4.7 inch Mk VIII naval gun
- QF 4.7 inch Mk V naval gun
- QF 4.7 inch Mk IX & XII
- QF 4.7 inch Mark XI gun
- QF 4.7 inch Gun Mk I - IV
- QF 4.5 inch naval gun
- QF 4.5 inch Mk I - V naval gun
- 4.5 inch Mark 8 naval gun
- EOC 4 inch 50 caliber
- QF 4 inch naval gun Mk XXIII
- QF 4 inch naval gun Mk IV, XII, XXII
- QF 4 inch naval gun Mk I – III
- QF 4 inch Mk XVI naval gun
- QF 4 inch Mk XIX naval gun
- QF 4 inch Mk V naval gun
- BL 4 inch naval gun Mk VII
- BL 4 inch naval gun Mk I - VI
- BL 4 inch Mk VIII & XI
- BL 4 inch Mk IX naval gun
- QF 3 inch Mk N1 naval gun
- QF 14 pounder Maxim-Nordenfelt naval gun
- QF 13 pounder 6 cwt naval gun Mark V
- QF 12 pounder 20 cwt naval gun
- QF 12 pounder 18 cwt naval gun
- QF 12 pounder 12 cwt naval gun
- QF 6 pounder Hotchkiss 8 cwt Mk I, Mk II
- QF 6 pounder Nordenfelt
- QF 6 pounder Mk IIA (Molins gun)
- QF 6 pounder 10 cwt naval gun
- QF 3 pounder Hotchkiss
- QF 3 pounder Nordenfelt
- QF 3 pounder Vickers naval gun
- QF 2 pounder naval gun
- QF 1-pounder pom-pom
- 68-pounder gun
- RML 64 pounder 64 cwt gun
- RBL 40 pounder Armstrong gun
- RBL 20 pounder Armstrong 13 & 15 cwt
- 1-inch Nordenfelt gun
- Armstrong Gun

== United States ==
- 18-inch/48-caliber Mark 1 gun (never used)
- 16-inch/50-caliber Mark 7 gun
- 16-inch/50-caliber Mark 2 & 3 guns (used as coast artillery and on the Iowa class battleships)
- 16-inch/45-caliber Mark 6 gun
- 16-inch/45-caliber Mark 1, 5, & 8 guns
- 14-inch/50-caliber Mark 4, 6, 7, 11 & B guns
- 14-inch/45-caliber Mark 1–3, 5, 8–10, & 12 guns
- 13-inch/35-caliber Mark 1 & 2 guns
- 12-inch/50-caliber Mark 8 gun
- 12-inch/50-caliber Mark 7 gun
- 12-inch/45-caliber Mark 5 gun
- 12-inch/40-caliber Mark 3 & 4 guns
- 12-inch/35-caliber Mark 1 & 2 guns
- 10-inch/40-caliber Mark 3 gun
- 10-inch/31-caliber Mark 1, 10-inch/30-caliber Mark 2, & 10-inch/35 caliber Mark 1 guns
- 8-inch/55-caliber Mark 71 Major Caliber Lightweight Gun (MCLWG)
- 8-inch/55-caliber Mark 9, 12, & 14–16 guns
- 8-inch/45-caliber Mark 6 gun
- 8-inch/35-caliber Mark 3 & 4 guns
- 8-inch/30-caliber Mark 1 & 2 guns
- 7-inch/44-caliber Mark 1 & 7-inch/45-caliber Mark 2 guns
- 155-mm/62-caliber Mark 51 Advanced Gun System (AGS)
- 6-inch/54-caliber Mark 12, 14, 15 & 18 guns
- 6-inch/50-caliber Mark 6 & 8 guns
- 6-inch/47-caliber Mark 16, 16DP, & 17 guns
- 6-inch/40-caliber Mark 4 gun
- 6-inch/30-caliber Mark 1–3 guns
- 5-inch/62-caliber & 5-inch/54-caliber Mark 45 guns
- 5-inch/54-caliber Mark 42 gun
- 5-inch/54-caliber Mark 16 gun
- 5-inch/51-caliber Mark 7–9, 14, & 15 guns
- 5-inch/50-caliber Mark 5 & 6 guns
- 5-inch/40-caliber Mark 2 & 3 guns
- 5-inch/38-caliber Mark 21, 22, 24, 28–30, 32, 37, & 38 guns
- 5-inch/31-caliber Mark 1 gun
- 5-inch/25-caliber Mark 10, 11, 13, & 17 guns
- 4.7-inch/50-caliber Mark 1–3 guns (Armstrong)
- 4-inch/50-caliber Mark 7–10 guns
- 4-inch/40-caliber Mark 1–6 guns
- 76-mm/62-caliber Mark 75 gun
- 3-inch/70-caliber Mark 26 gun
- 3-inch/50-caliber Mark 2, 3, 5, 6, 8, 10, 17–22 guns
- 3-inch/23-caliber Mark 9, 13, & 14 guns
- 3-inch/21-caliber Mark 1 gun (field gun for United States Navy and United States Marine Corps)
- 57-mm/70-caliber Mark 110 Mod 0 Bofors gun
- 40-mm/56-caliber Mark 1, 2, & M1 Bofors guns
- 30-mm Mark 46 Bushmaster II gun
- 1.1-inch/75-caliber gun
- 25-mm/87-caliber Mark 38 Machine gun system
- 20-mm/76-caliber M61A1 & 20-mm/99-caliber M61A1 Gatling OGB gun
- 20-mm Mark 16 gun
- 20-mm/70-caliber Mark 2–4 Oerlikon cannons

== See also ==
- List of artillery
- List of the largest cannons by caliber
