= USS Charleston (C-2) =

American protected cruiser

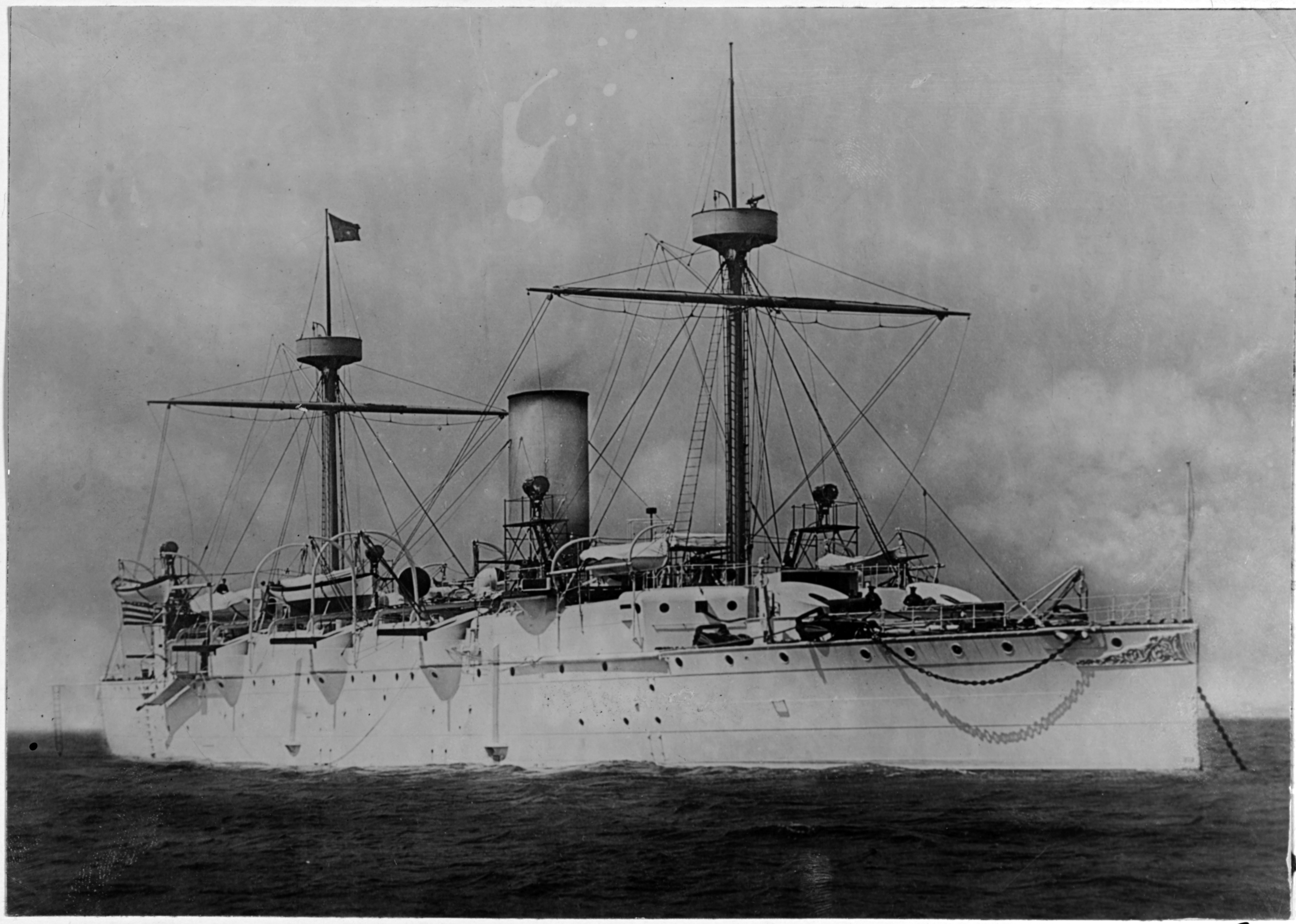
- Undated photograph of Charleston taken prior to her 1891 refit, where her two bow 6-inch guns were replaced by a single 8-inch gun

History

United States
- Name: Charleston
- Namesake: Charleston, South Carolina and; Charleston, West Virginia
- Builder: Union Iron Works, San Francisco
- Laid down: 20 January 1887
- Launched: 19 July 1888
- Sponsored by: Mrs. A. S. Smith
- Commissioned: 26 December 1889
- Decommissioned: 27 July 1896
- Recommissioned: 5 May 1898
- Identification: Hull symbol:C-2
- Fate: Grounded 2 November 1899 near Camiguin Island, Philippines and abandoned

General characteristics
- Type: Protected cruiser
- Displacement: 3,730 long tons (3,790 t)
- Length: 320 ft (97.5 m)
- Beam: 46 ft (14.0 m)
- Draft: 18 ft 6 in (5.64 m)
- Installed power: 6 × steam boilers; 2 × Horizontal compound engines; 7,500 ihp (5,600 kW)
- Propulsion: 2 × screws
- Speed: 19 knots (35 km/h; 22 mph) designed
- Range: 2,990 nmi (5,540 km; 3,440 mi) at 10 kn (19 km/h; 12 mph)
- Complement: 34 officers, 296 men, 30 Marines
- Armament: 2 × 8-inch (203 mm)/35 caliber Mark 3 guns; 6 × 6-inch (152 mm)/30 caliber Mark 3 guns; 4 × 6-pounder (57 mm (2.2 in)) guns; 2 × 3-pounder (47 mm (1.9 in)) guns; 2 × 1-pounder (37 mm (1.5 in)) guns; 2 × .45 caliber (11.4 mm) Gatling guns
- Armor: Gun shields: 3 in (76 mm); Main deck: 3 in (76 mm); Conning Tower: 2 in (51 mm)

Service record
- Commanders: Captain George C. Remey; Captain Henry Glass
- Operations: Spanish–American War; Capture of Guam

The second USS Charleston (C-2) was a United States Navy protected cruiser — the fourth US protected cruiser to be built. Lacking experience in building steel cruisers, the design was purchased from the British company Armstrong, Mitchell and Co. of Newcastle, the construction to be by an American shipyard. In design, she succeeded the "ABC" cruisers Atlanta, Boston, and Chicago with better protection, higher speed, and similar armament.

She was launched on 19 July 1888 by Union Iron Works, San Francisco, California, sponsored by Mrs. A. S. Smith, and commissioned on 26 December 1889, Captain George C. Remey in command.

== Design and construction ==
Charleston was built with plans purchased from Armstrong, a British manufacturer, which were similar to the Armstrong-built Naniwa and launched in 1885. USS Baltimore was also built to Armstrong plans. Building Charleston's propulsion machinery proved troublesome; apparently it was a combination of components of several different plants. Union Iron Works had to make costly changes in order to build the ship.

Charleston was armed with two 8-inch (203 mm)/35 caliber Mark 3 guns, one each in bow and stern barbettes, and six 6-inch (152 mm)/30 caliber Mark 3 guns in sponsons along the sides. The 8-inch guns were initially unavailable, so from her commissioning in 1889 until a refit in 1891 they were replaced by four additional 6-inch guns. Secondary armament was four 6-pounder (2.2 in (57 mm)) guns, two 3-pounder (1.85 in (47 mm)) Hotchkiss revolving cannon, two 1-pounder (1.5 in (37 mm)) Hotchkiss revolving cannon, and two .45 caliber (11.4 mm) Gatling guns. Four 14-inch (356 mm) torpedo tubes were included in the design but never mounted.

Charleston had 3 in (76 mm) gun shields, 2 in (51 mm) barbettes, and a 2 in (51 mm) conning tower. The complete armored deck was up to 3 in (76 mm) on its sloped sides and 2 in (51 mm) in the middle.

The engineering plant included six coal-fired cylindrical boilers producing steam for two horizontal compound engines totaling 7,500 ihp (5,600 kW) for a speed of 18.2 knots (33.7 km/h; 20.9 mph) on trials. Charleston was the last US Navy ship with the older compound engine design; later ships had more powerful and efficient triple expansion engines. Unlike some contemporary designs, no sails were fitted. Charleston carried 328 tons of coal for a range of 2,990 nmi (5,540 km; 3,440 mi) at 10 kn (19 km/h; 12 mph); this could be increased to 682 tons for 7,477 nmi (13,847 km; 8,604 mi).

== Service history ==
=== Pacific, 1890–96 ===
Charleston cleared Mare Island Navy Yard on 10 April 1890 to join the Pacific Squadron as flagship, cruising in the eastern Pacific. She carried the remains of King David Kalakaua of Hawaii to Honolulu after his death in San Francisco, and between 8 May and 4 June 1891, took part in the search for the Chilean steamer Itata which had fled San Diego in violation of the American neutrality laws, enforced strictly during the 1891 Chilean Civil War. Between 19 August and 31 December 1891, Charleston cruised in the Far East as flagship of the Asiatic Squadron, rejoining the Pacific Squadron in 1892 until 7 October, when she departed for the east coast, calling at a number of South American ports en route.

Charleston arrived in Hampton Roads on 23 February 1893. From here she sailed with other American and foreign ships to the International Naval Review conducted at New York City on 26 April 1893 as part of the Columbian Exposition. Taking the review was President Grover Cleveland in despatch vessel USS Dolphin. In the fall of 1893, Charleston turned south to join the strong force patrolling the east coast of South America to protect American interests and shipping from disturbance during the Brazilian Revolution. After a leisurely cruise from Montevideo, Uruguay, she arrived in San Francisco on 8 July 1894 to prepare for a return to the Asiatic Station. She cruised in the Far East until 6 June 1896, when she steamed from Yokohama for San Francisco where she was placed out of commission on 27 July 1896.

=== Spanish–American War, 1898–99 ===
Upon the outbreak of the Spanish–American War, Charleston was quickly made ready for service, and was recommissioned on 5 May 1898, Captain Henry Glass, Commanding. Sixteen days later, she sailed for Honolulu, where she was joined by three chartered steamers transporting troops, including City of Peking.

Charleston was sent to raise the American flag over Guam, then a Spanish possession. At daybreak on 20 June, the little convoy arrived off the north end of Guam. Charleston investigated the harbor at Agana, then proceeded to Apra Harbor. Leaving the transports safely anchored outside, Charleston sailed boldly into the harbor, firing a challenge at Fort Santa Cruz. Almost at once, a boatload of Spanish authorities came out to apologize for having no gunpowder with which to return the presumed salute. They were astounded to learn that a state of war existed, and that the American ships had come to take the island. The next day the surrender was received by a landing party sent ashore from Charleston. With the Spanish governor and the island's garrison of 69 as prisoners in one of the transports, Charleston then sailed to join Admiral George Dewey's fleet in Manila Bay.

She arrived Manila on 30 June 1898 to reinforce the victors of the previous month's great naval battle in their close blockade of the Bay. Charleston joined in the final bombardment of 13 August, which brought about the surrender of the city of Manila. She remained in the Philippines through 1898 and 1899, bombarding insurgent positions to aid Army forces advancing ashore, and taking part in the naval expedition that captured Subic Bay in September 1899.

=== Loss by wrecking, November 1899 ===
Charleston grounded on Guinápac Rocks (18°58′25″N 122°06′06″E), about 10 miles East by South of Camiguin Island north of Luzon at 5:30am on 2 November 1899. Wrecked beyond salvage, she was abandoned by all her crew, who made camp on a nearby island, later moving on to Camiguin while the ship's sailing launch was sent for help. On 12 November, gunboat Helena (PG-9) arrived to rescue the shipwrecked men. Charleston was the first steel-hulled ship lost by the US Navy.

== See also ==
- Capture of Guam

== Bibliography ==
- Bauer, K. Jack; Roberts, Stephen S. (1991). Register of Ships of the U.S. Navy, 1775–1990: Major Combatants. Westport, Connecticut: Greenwood Press. ISBN 0-313-26202-0.
- Beach, Edward L. The United States Navy: 200 Years. New York: H. Holt, 1986. ISBN 0-03-044711-9 OCLC 12104038
- Burr, Lawrence. US Cruisers 1883–1904: The Birth of the Steel Navy. Oxford: Osprey, 2008. ISBN 1-84603-267-9 OCLC 488657946
- Friedman, Norman (1984). U.S. Cruisers: An Illustrated Design History. Annapolis, Maryland: United States Naval Institute. ISBN 0-87021-718-6.
- Gardiner, Robert; Chesneau, Roger (1979). Conway's All the World's Fighting Ships 1860–1905. New York: Mayflower Books. ISBN 0-8317-0302-4.
- Mannix, Daniel P. The Old Navy. New York: Macmillan, 1983. ISBN 0-02-579470-1 OCLC 9643265
- Silverstone, Paul H. The New Navy, 1883–1922. New York: Routledge, 2006. ISBN 0-415-97871-8 OCLC 63171106
- Spears, John Randolph. The American Navy in the War with Spain . London: Bickers & Son, 1899. OCLC 12795044
