= Squadron of Evolution =

19th century US Navy unit

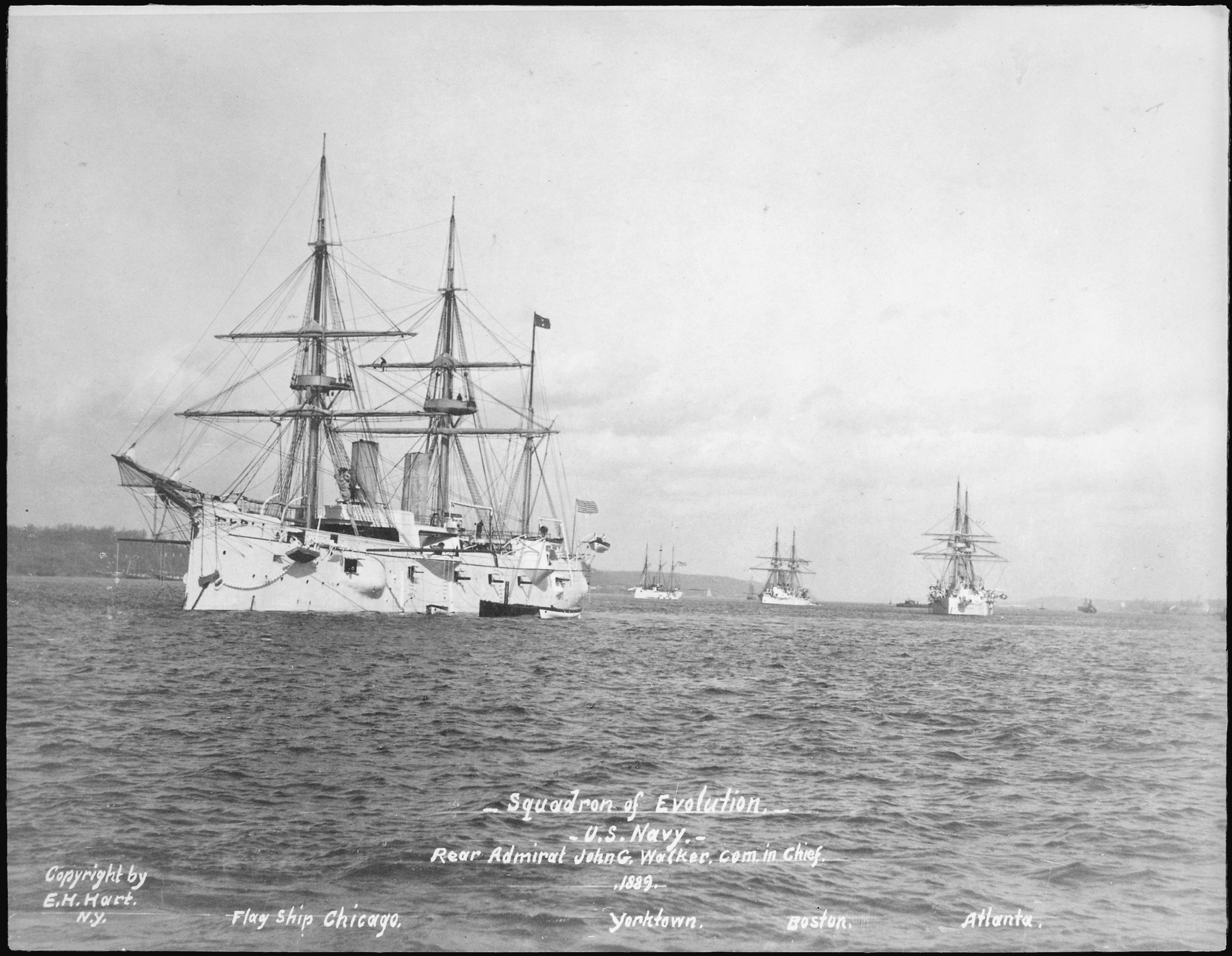
Chicago leading the squadron, 1889

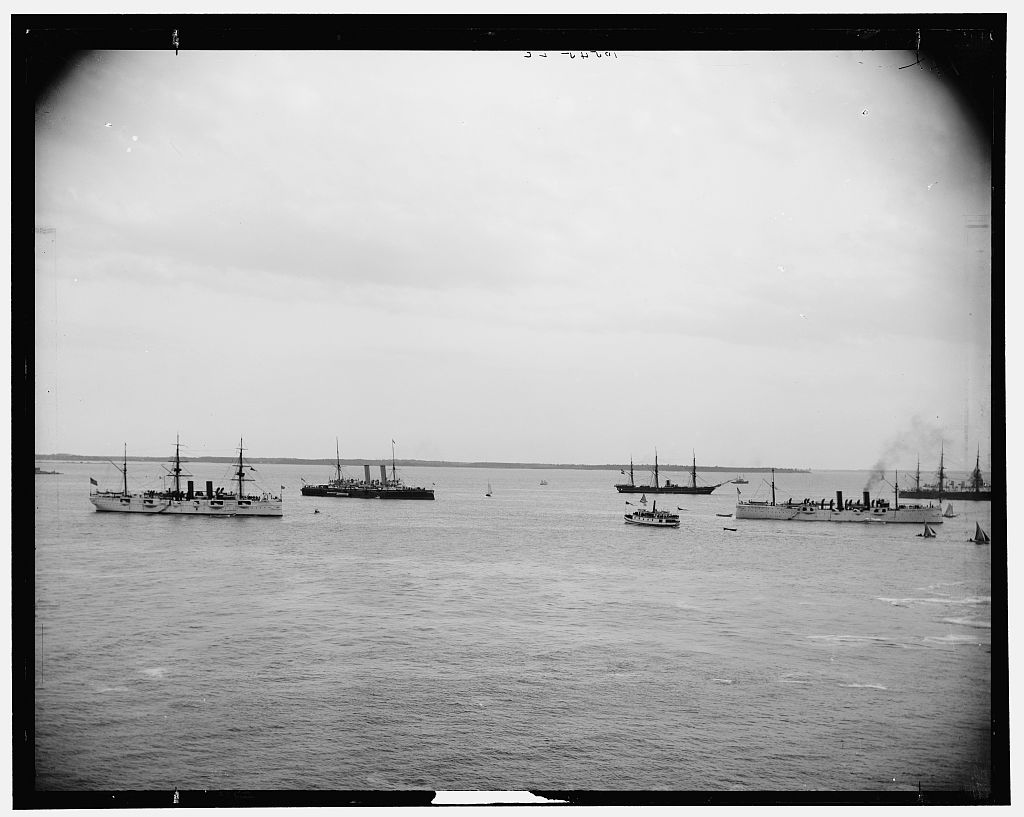
The White Squadron at Hampton Roads, 1889

The Squadron of Evolution—sometimes referred to as the "White Squadron" or the "ABCD ships" after the first four— was a transitional unit in the United States Navy during the late 19th century. It was probably inspired by the French "Escadre d'évolution" of the 18th and 19th centuries. The squadron was composed of the protected cruisers USS Atlanta, USS Boston, USS Chicago, and dispatch boats USS Dolphin and USS Yorktown. Yorktown′s sister ships USS Bennington and USS Concord joined the squadron in 1891.

Rear Admiral John G. Walker served as its Commander with Chicago as his flagship. Walker was a proponent of the relatively new practice of concentrating ships into formations controlled by a single commander, and used his position to carry out exercises in squadron tactics, ship-to-ship signalling, and landing operations. Having both full rigged masts and steam engines, the White Squadron was also influential in the beginning of steel shipbuilding in the United States.

Following a period of sea trials in the fall of 1889, the squadron was first set underway from New York on November 18, 1889. After being displayed at a public maritime celebration in Boston, the squadron sailed to Lisbon, Portugal, where Walker was received by the Portuguese government and conducted exercises to determine his ships' ability to execute coordinated maneuvers under steam. On January 17, 1890, the squadron called at Cartagena, Spain, where the vessels were toured by Spanish authorities, who gave "their favorable opinions regarding the handsome construction, clean state, and the latest sea and war improvements and perfect order of the four ships." After stops at Mahón, Toulon, Villefranche, and Spezia, the squadron headed to Corfu, where Walker carried out target practice and landing exercises. The White Squadron remained in the Mediterranean until leaving for Algiers on April 30. After arriving there, Walker received a telegram ordering the squadron to head across the Atlantic to Brazil in order to support U.S. interests there following the recent military coup. After arriving there, and being greeted with ceremony by representatives of the new government, the squadron turned back to the United States, returning to New York in July 1890.

In 1891, the White Squadron commenced a tour of the Great Lakes, which was commemorated in an album by Woolson Spice Co. At that time, the White Squadron consisted of the cruiser USS Philadelphia under the command of Captain Frederick Rodgers, USS Charleston under the command of Captain George C. Remey, USS Baltimore under the command of Captain Winfield S. Schley, USS Boston under the command of Captain Gilbert C. Wise, USS Vesuvius under the command of Lieutenant Seaton Schroeder, the torpedo boat USS Cushing under Lieutenant Cameron McRae Winslow, USS Petrel under the command of Lieutenant-Commander M. R. S. McKenzie, USS Atlanta under the command of Captain John W. Philip, and USS Chicago under the command of Captain Joseph N. Miller. Some of the ships had other squadron assignments prior to the 1891 cruise.

== Bibliography ==
- Leader, Henry G. The story of the USS Boston. [n.p., 1946?]. OCLC 51732066.
- Rentfrow, James C. Home Squadron: The U.S. Navy on the North Atlantic Station. Annapolis, Maryland : Naval Institute Press, 2014. ISBN 1-61251-447-2 OCLC 865711810
- Alberto Molina to Blaine, 24 January 1890, Area Files of the Naval Records Collection, 1775-1910, 1775-1910, RG 45, NARA, Washington, DC.
- The White Squadron. [Toledo, Ohio]: Woolson Spice Co., 1891. OCLC 45112425
- The White squadron of the U S Navy. New York : James Clarke Publisher, 1894. OCLC 50490393.
- The White Squadron : armed cruisers, U.S.N.. New York : International Art Publ. Co, [ 18--]. OCLC 271460419.
