= Bofors 40 mm gun =

Bofors 40 mm gun is a name or designation given to models of 40 mm calibre automatic anti-aircraft guns designed and developed by the Swedish company Bofors:

- Bofors 40 mm Automatic Gun L/43 - developed in the 1930s with market entry in 1934, widely used in World War II and into the 1990s
- Bofors 40 mm Automatic Gun L/60 - developed in the 1930s with market entry in 1936, widely used in World War II and into the 1990s, still in minor use
- Bofors 40 mm Automatic Gun L/70 - developed in the 1940s with market entry in 1948, widely used in the Cold War to today

== Other Bofors gun disambiguation pages ==
- Bofors 57 mm gun
- Bofors 120 mm gun
