= Oregon Naval Militia =

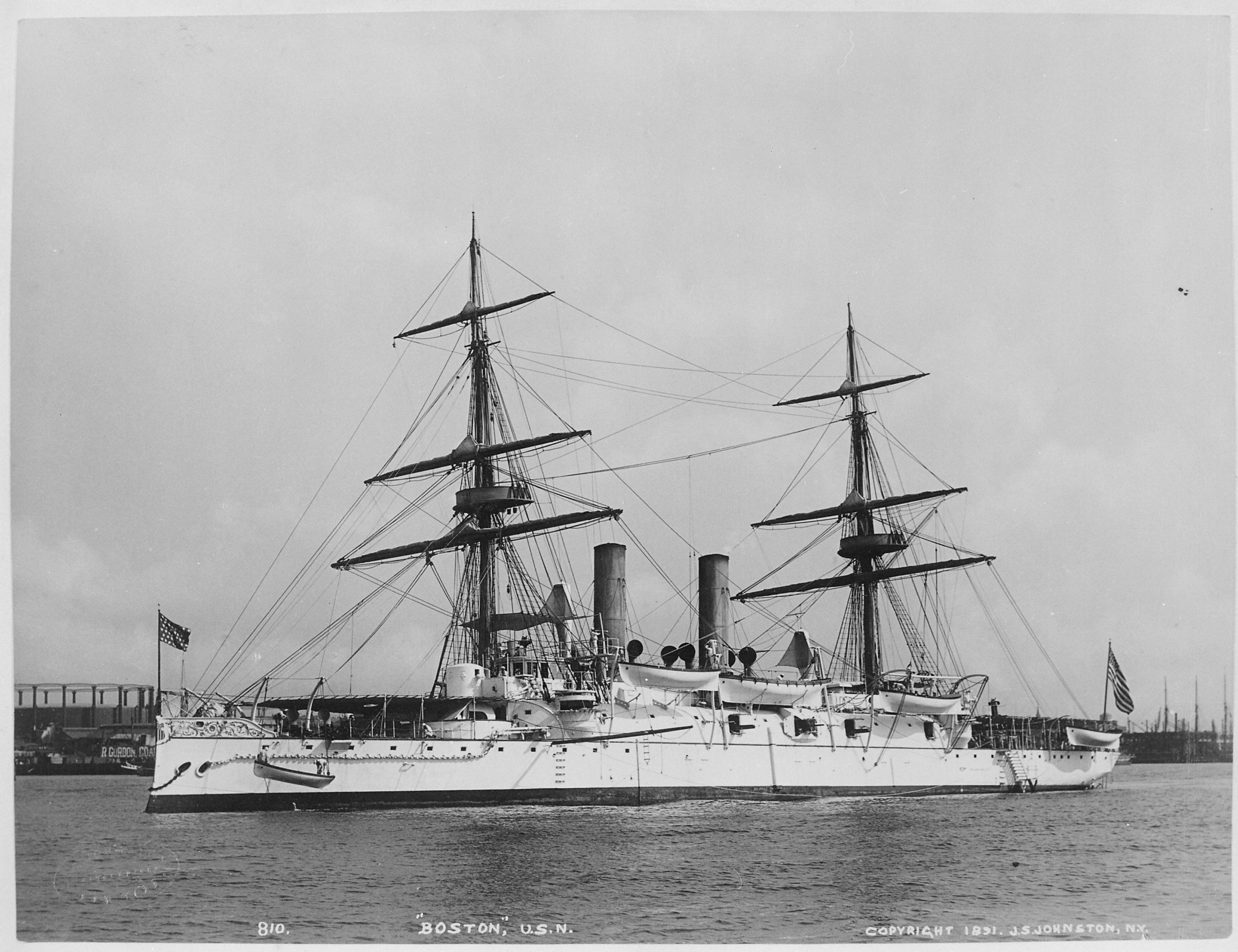
- Oregon militia training ship, USS Boston
- Active: 1910 - 1917
- Country: United States
- Allegiance: Oregon
- Branch: Navy
- Type: Naval militia
- Role: Military reserve force
- Part of: Oregon Military Department

The Oregon Naval Militia is the unorganized naval militia of the state of Oregon. As a naval militia, the Oregon Naval Militia was a reserve unit organized as a naval parallel to the Oregon National Guard.

== History ==
In 1910, USS Boston was assigned to the Oregon Naval Militia by the Secretary of the Navy. From 15 June 1911 to September 1916, she served as a training vessel for the naval militia.

In 1915, a bill was introduced to the Oregon Legislative Assembly for the purpose of disbanding the naval militia. However, at the urging of the Secretary of the Navy, Josephus Daniels, the Governor of Oregon instead signed a bill funding and reorganizing the Oregon Naval Militia.

In 1916, the Oregon Naval Militia performed its annual training aboard USS Marblehead which served as a training ship for the Oregon Naval Militia until 1917 when it was placed back on commission with the Navy. By April 1916, an aeronautical section had been added to the organization.

In 1917, Oregon's naval militia was merged into federal service and became a component of the U.S. Navy Reserve, marking the end of the Oregon Naval Militia.

== Personnel ==
Naval militias are partially regulated and equipped by the federal government, and therefore membership requirements are partially set according to federal standards. Under 10 U.S. Code § 7854, in order to be eligible for access to "vessels, material, armament, equipment, and other facilities of the Navy and the Marine Corps available to the Navy Reserve and the Marine Corps Reserve", at least 95% of members of the naval militia must also be members of the United States Navy Reserve or the United States Marine Corps Reserve.

== Legal status ==
Naval militias of U.S. states are recognized as part of the organized militia by the federal government of the United States under 10 U.S. Code §7851. Any action for the reactivation of this service falls either on the office of the Governor of Oregon or by the state legislative assembly.

== See also ==
- Oregon Civil Defense Force
