= Hamlin Park =

Public park in Shoreline, Washington

Coordinates: 47.747°N 122.309°W

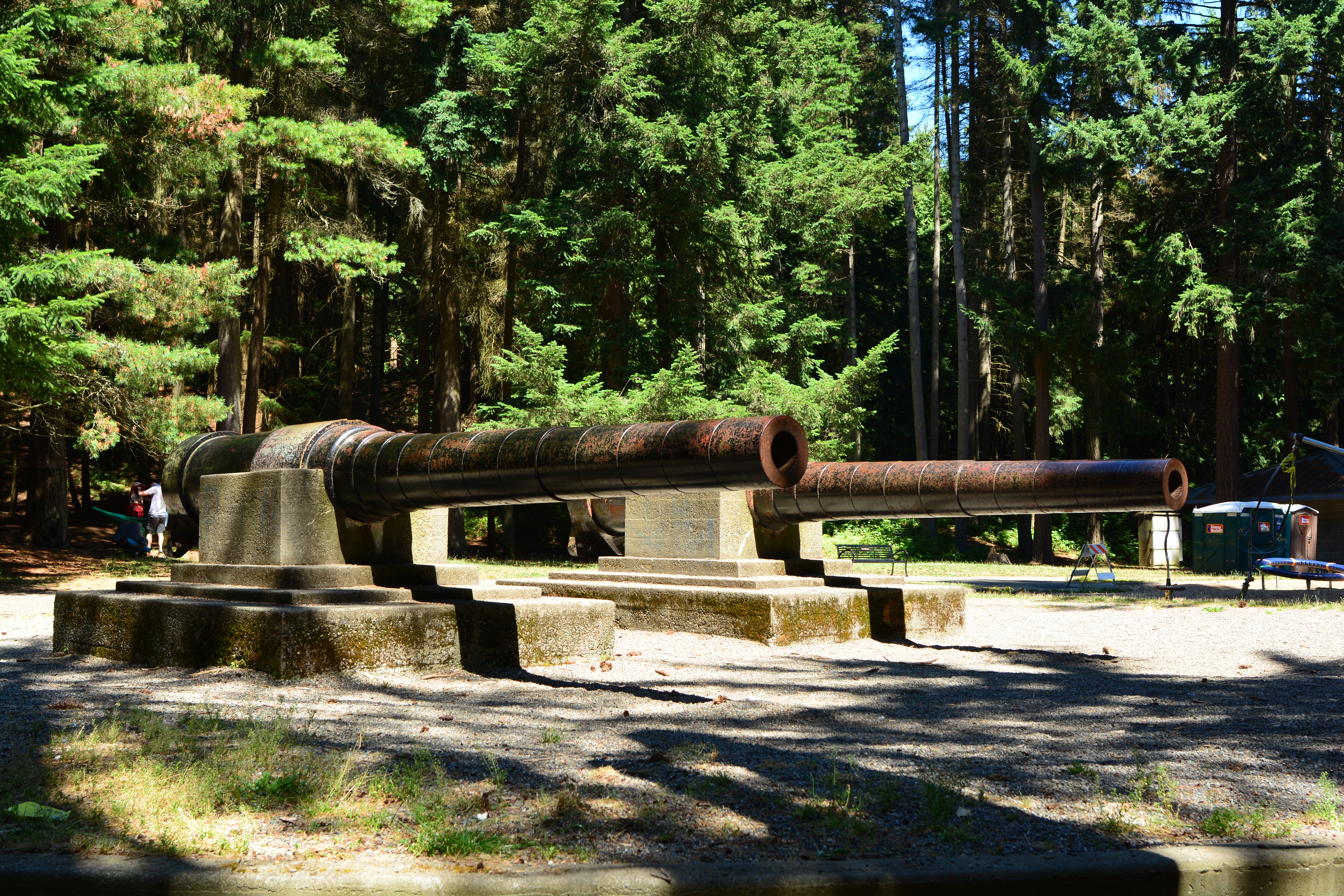
Guns from USS Boston in Hamlin Park, 2020

Hamlin Park is an 80-acre (32.4-hectare) public park in Shoreline, Washington, in the United States. The park includes a wooded area with trails, a softball/baseball field with bleachers, two playgrounds, and a picnic shelter. An orienteering course with waypoint markers is laid out within the park.

Two historic 8-inch/30-caliber guns from the protected cruiser USS Boston are mounted near the park's main playground.

In 2017, the park was a subject of controversy in response to the city's proposal to convert part of the wooded area into a maintenance facility. After a series of "Save Hamlin Park" protests from city residents, the proposal was withdrawn.

== History ==
Howard H. Hamlin was a real estate developer who owned land in 1907 in the area that would eventually become Hamlin Park. In 1910, Ole Hanson’s North Seattle Improvement Company purchased the land to develop it into the city of Lake Forest Park. Hamlin died on January 13, 1926, at the age of 80 at his home on Capital Hill. In 1939, thirteen years after Hamlin’s death, the Seattle Trust and Savings Bank donated eight acres (3.2 hectares) of land to King County to be developed into Hamlin Park with funds from the Works Progress Administration. In 1948, community clubs and civic groups campaigned to have wooded land north of the Firland Sanatorium owned by the state added to the eight acre park. A ceremony dedicating the expanded Hamlin Park took place on May 8, 1949.
