= 8-inch/30-caliber gun =

8"/30 caliber Mark 1 & 2 Naval Gun
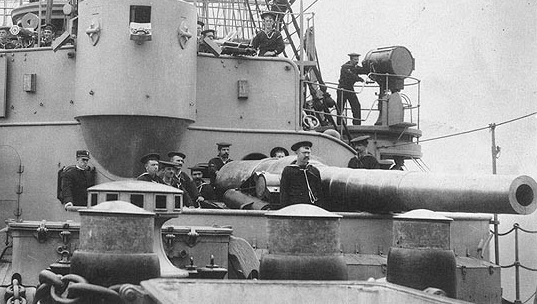
- USS Boston's forward 8"/30 gun is in the right foreground, with its crew standing at their posts.
- Type: Naval gun
- Place of origin: United States

Service history
- In service: 1886–1906
- Used by: United States Navy
- Wars: Spanish–American War; World War I

Production history
- Designer: Bureau of Ordnance
- Designed: 1883
- Manufacturer: U.S. Naval Gun Factory
- Produced: 1886–
- No. built: Mark 1: 4 (Nos. 1–4); Mark 2: 4 (Nos. 5–8)
- Variants: Mark 1 Mod 0 and 1 and Mark 2 Mod 1

Specifications
- Mass: 29,100 lb (13,200 kg) (without breech)
- Length: 257.99 in (6,553 mm) Mark 1 Mod 0; 254.6 in (6,470 mm) Mark 1 Mod 1; 255.6 in (6,490 mm) Mark 2 Mod 1
- Barrel length: 240 in (6,100 mm) bore (30 calibers); 244.78 in (6,217 mm) bore 30 calibers
- Shell: 260 lb (120 kg)
- Caliber: 8 in (203 mm)
- Elevation: −5° to +20°
- Traverse: −150° to +150°
- Rate of fire: 0.5–1 round per minute
- Muzzle velocity: 2,000 ft/s (610 m/s)
- Effective firing range: 14,000 yd (13,000 m) at 20° elevation

The 8"/30 caliber gun (spoken "eight-inch-thirty-caliber") formed the main batteries of the United States Navy's "New Navy". They were a US naval gun that first entered service in 1886, and were designed for use with the first three protected cruisers, Atlanta, Boston and Chicago.

== Mark 1 ==
Mark 1, Nos. 1–4, Mod 0, consisted of a tube, jacket, 19 hoops and an elevating band with integral trunnions. The Mod 1 had no trunnions and were not hooped to the muzzle. They weighed 29,100 lb (13,200 kg), without the breech, with a barrel length of 240 in (6,100 mm) bore (30 calibers).

== Mark 2 ==
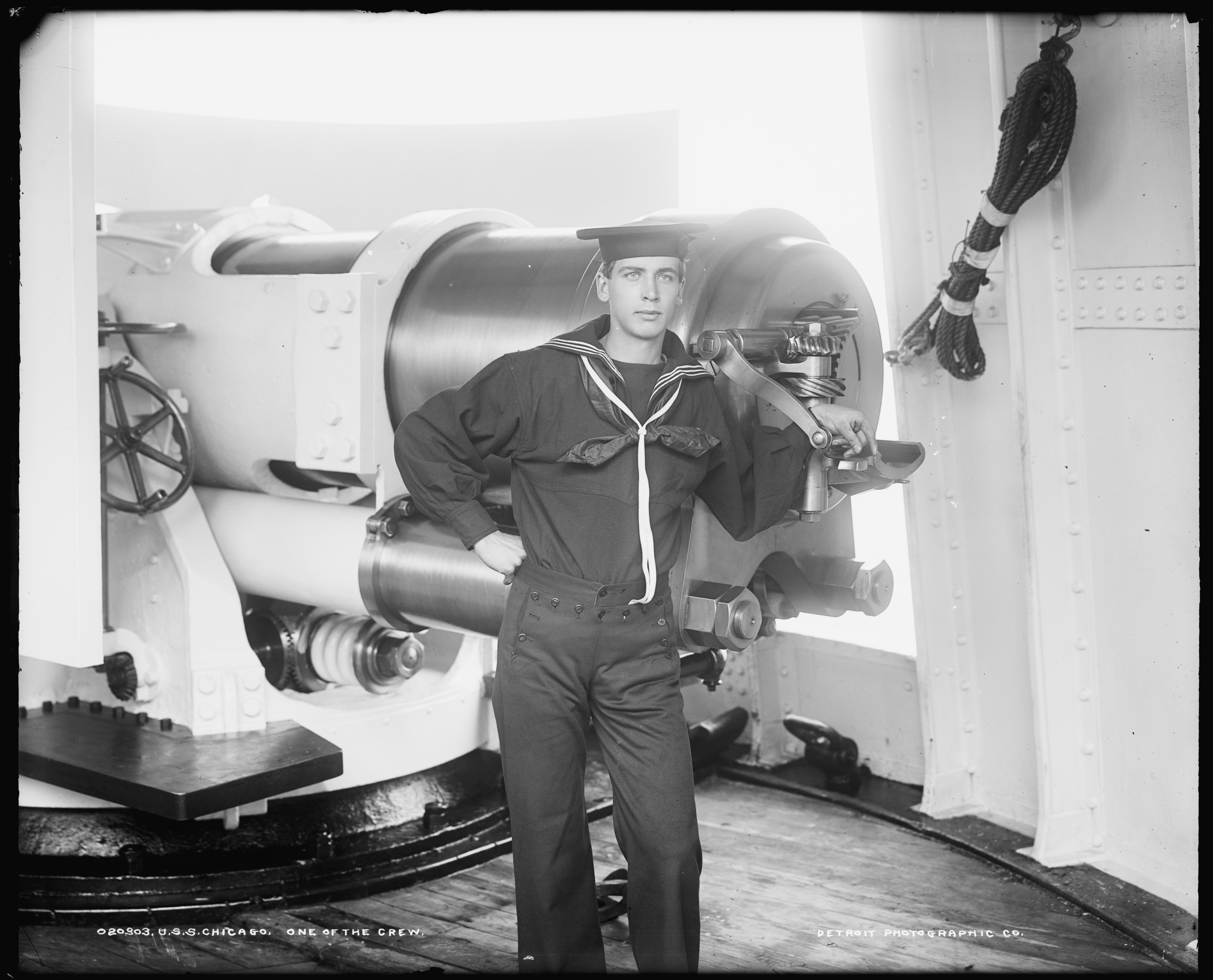
A sailor from the USS Chicago with an 8-inch gun

The Mark 2 Mod 1, Nos. 5–8, was similar, but had the hoops differently arranged, did not have integral trunnions and had its rear sights controlled by worm and miter gears. Mark 2 gun No. 7, from Chicago, was later modified into a pneumatic gun and mounted in Vesuvius to fire a 10 in (254 mm) aerial torpedo.

== Naval Service ==
Ship	Gun Installed	Gun Mount
USS Atlanta (1884)	Mark 1: 2 × 8"/30 caliber	Mark 1: 2 × Single Barbette Mount
USS Boston (1884)	Mark 1: 2 × 8"/30 caliber	Mark 1: 2 × Single Barbette Mount
USS Chicago (1885)	Mark 2: 4 × 8"/30 caliber	Mark 2: 4 × Single "Half-turret"

== On display ==
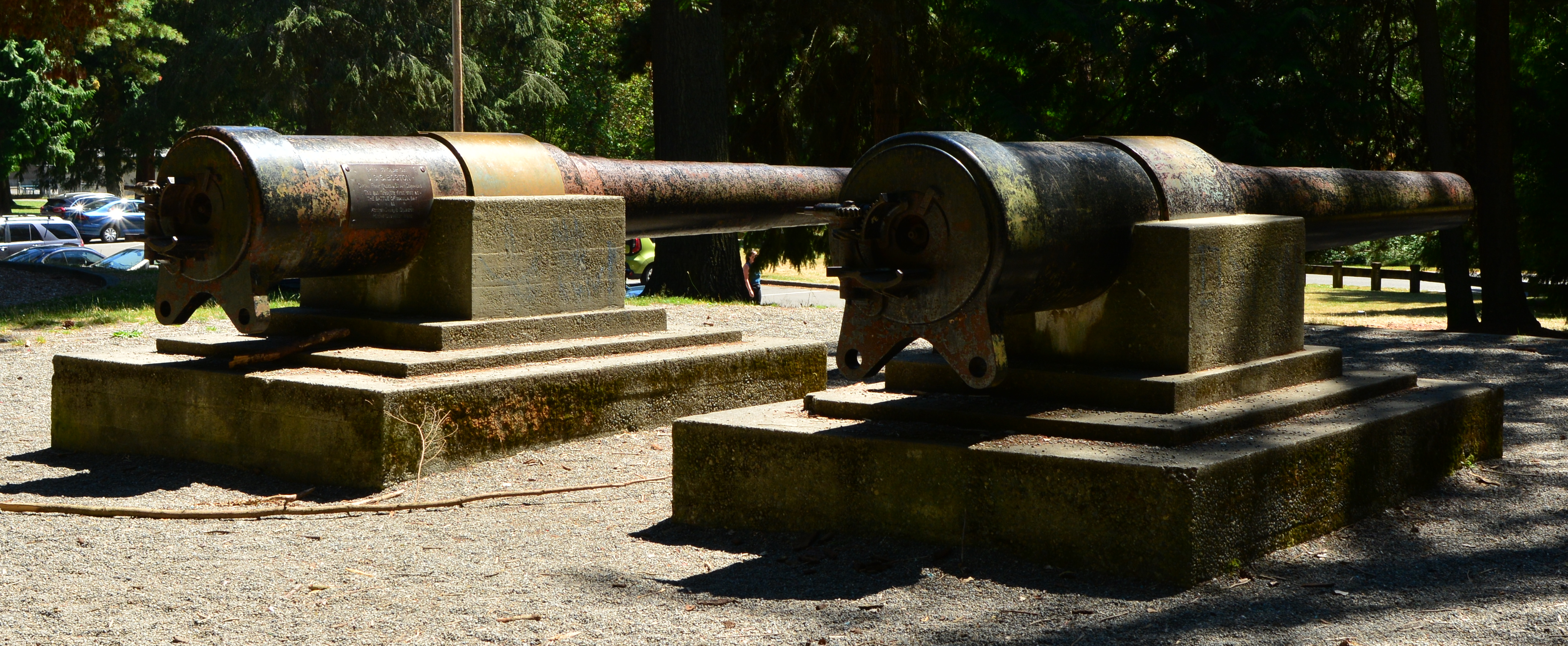

Two guns from the cruiser Boston are currently (2010) on display at Hamlin Park in Shoreline, Washington. A plaque at the site states that one of these guns fired the first shot at the Battle of Manila Bay on 1 May 1898. Another plaque states

             8-inch 30 Caliber Gun
                 U.S.S. Boston
   Captain Frank Wildes, U.S. Navy Commanding
            This gun is credited at
           THE BATTLE OF MANILA BAY
         with dismounting three guns
                  in the
           Spanish fort at Cavite
                May 1, 1898

The two guns from Boston are marked "U. S. NAVY 8in MARK II 1899 CONVERTED".
