= Bofors 120 mm gun =

The Bofors 120 mm gun is a nickname or designation given to several types of guns designed and developed by the Swedish company Bofors:

- Bofors 120 mm Automatic Gun L/46
- Bofors 120 mm Naval Automatic Gun L/50

== Other equivalent disambiguation pages ==
- Bofors 40 mm gun
- Bofors 57 mm gun
