= Battle of Guam =

Battle of Guam may refer to:

- The Battle of Guam (1941), a World War II battle in which Japanese forces took the island from the Americans in December 1941
- The Battle of Guam (1944), a World War II battle in which two American divisions fought for a month to retake the island from the Japanese
- Capture of Guam (1898) , a bloodless event in which American forces took the island from Spain in 1898
