= USS Chicago (1885) =

Protected cruiser of the US Navy

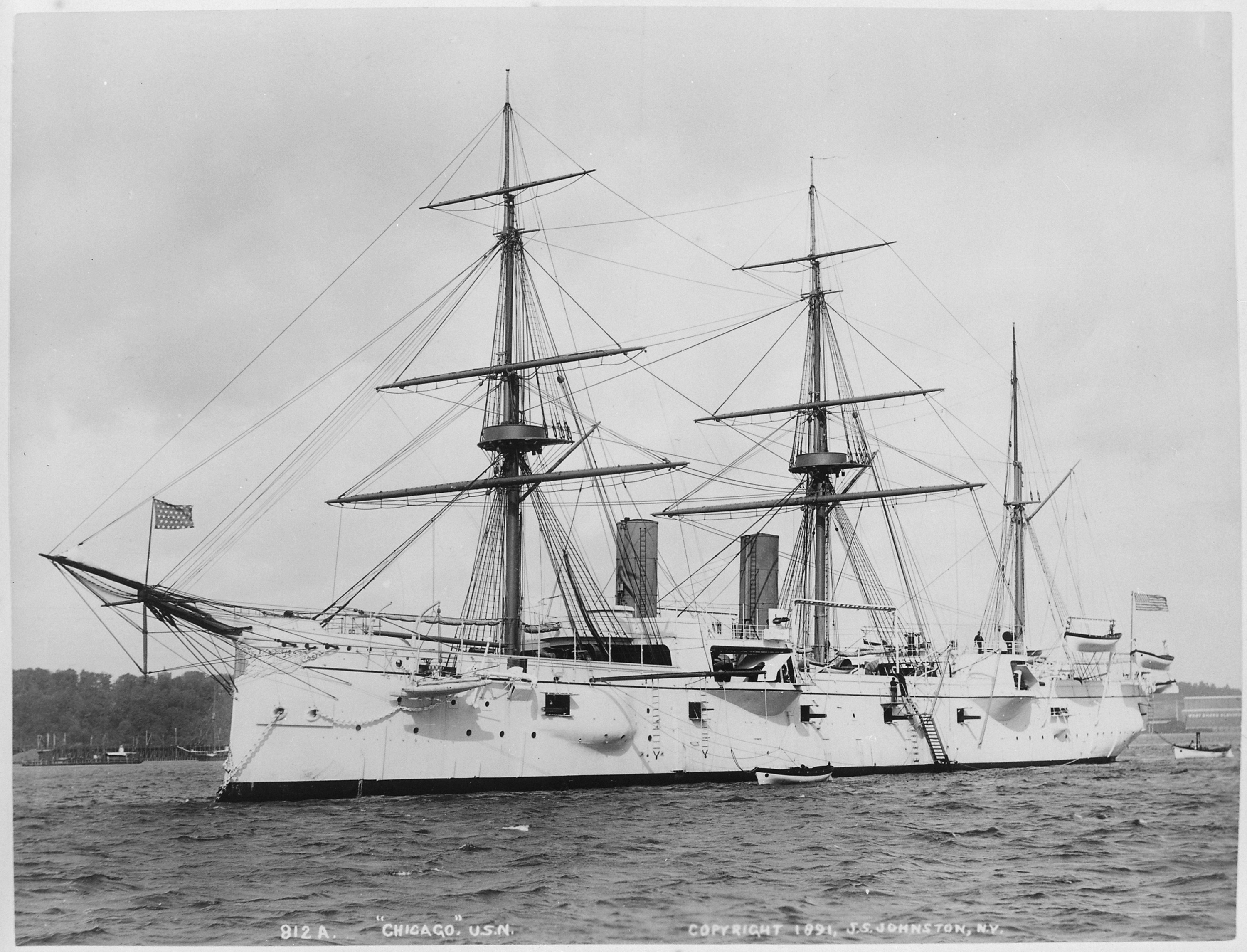
- USS Chicago in 1891

History

United States
- Name: Chicago (1885–1928); Alton (1928–1936)
- Namesake: City of Chicago, Illinois; City of Alton, Illinois
- Ordered: 3 March 1883
- Awarded: 26 July 1883
- Builder: Delaware River Iron Ship Building and Engine Works, Chester, Pennsylvania
- Cost: $889,000 (contract price of hull and machinery)
- Laid down: 29 December 1883
- Launched: 5 December 1885
- Sponsored by: Edith Cleborne
- Commissioned: 17 April 1889
- Decommissioned: 30 September 1923
- Renamed: Alton 16 July 1928 and reclassified IX-5
- Reclassified: CA-14, 17 July 1920; CL-14, 8 August 1921; IX-5, 16 June 1928
- Identification: Hull symbol:CA-14; Hull symbol:CL-14; Hull symbol:IX-5
- Fate: sold 15 May 1936, Foundered under tow 8 July 1936

General characteristics (as built)
- Type: Protected cruiser
- Displacement: 4,500 long tons (4,572 t)
- Length: 342 ft 2 in (104.29 m) oa; 325 ft (99 m) pp
- Beam: 48 ft 3 in (14.71 m)
- Draft: 19 ft (5.8 m)
- Installed power: 14 × 100 psi (690 kPa) coal-fired boilers
- Propulsion: 2 × compound overhead beam steam engines; 5,084 ihp (3,791 kW); 2 × screws
- Sail plan: Schooner
- Speed: 14 kn (16 mph; 26 km/h)
- Capacity: 830 short tons (750 t) of coal
- Complement: 45 officers and 356 enlisted men
- Armament: 4 × 8-inch (200 mm)/30 caliber Mark 2 guns (4x1); 8 × 6-inch (150 mm)/30 caliber Mark 2 guns (8x1); 2 × 5-inch (130 mm)/31 caliber Mark 1 guns (2x1); 2 × 6-pounder 57 mm (2.24 in) guns; 4 × 3-pounder 47 mm (1.85 in) guns; 2 × 1-pounder 37 mm (1.46 in) Hotchkiss revolver cannon; 2 × .45 caliber (11.4 mm) Gatling guns
- Armor: Gun shields: 4 in (100 mm); Deck: 1.5 in (38 mm); Conning tower: 3 in (76 mm)

General characteristics (1895 & 1902 rebuild)
- Displacement: 5,000 long tons (5,080 t)
- Installed power: 2 × Triple expansion engines; 9,000 ihp (6,700 kW)
- Propulsion: 6 × Babcock & Wilcox boilers; 4 × Single ended boilers; 2 × screws
- Speed: 18 knots (33 km/h; 21 mph) (Speed on Trial)
- Armament: 4 × 8 in (200 mm)/35 caliber Mark 4 guns (4x1); 14 × 5 in (130 mm)/40 caliber Mark 3 guns (2x1)

The first USS Chicago (later CA-14) was a protected cruiser of the United States Navy, the largest of the original three authorized by Congress for the "New Navy" and one of the U.S. Navy's first four steel ships.

== Design ==
Chicago was ordered as one of the "ABCD" ships, the others being the protected cruisers USS Atlanta and USS Boston and the dispatch vessel USS Dolphin. These were the Navy's first steel-hulled ships, and their ordering is generally taken to mark the beginning of the "New Navy."

Chicago was built with a displacement of 4,500 long tons (4,572 t) at an overall length of 342 ft 2 in (104.29 m) and 325 ft (99 m) at the perpendiculars. Her beam was 48 ft 3 in (14.71 m) with a draft of 19 ft (5.8 m). She had fourteen 100-psi boilers that powered two compound overhead beam steam engines, producing a total of 5,084 ihp (3,791 kW) to turn her two screws and achieve a speed of 14 kn (16 mph; 26 km/h). Chicago was capable of carrying 830 short tons (750 t) of coal. Like the other "ABCD" ships, Chicago — rigged as a bark — was built with a sail rig to increase her cruising range.

Chicago's original armament consisted of four 8-inch (203 mm)/30 caliber Mark 2 guns, eight 6-inch (152 mm)/30 caliber Mark 2 guns, two 5-inch (127 mm)/31 caliber Mark 1 guns, two 6-pounder 57 mm (2.24 in) guns, four 3-pounder 47 mm (1.85 in) guns, two 1-pounder 37 mm (1.46 in) Hotchkiss revolver cannon, and two .45 caliber (11.4 mm) Gatling guns.

She had 4 in (100 mm) of armor on her gun shields, 1.5 in (38 mm) on her deck, and 3 in (76 mm) on her conning tower.

== Construction and commissioning ==
All four "ABCD" ships were ordered from the same shipyard, John Roach & Sons of Chester, Pennsylvania. However, when United States Secretary of the Navy William C. Whitney initially refused to accept Dolphin, claiming her design was defective, the Roach yard went bankrupt and Chicago's completion was delayed for about three years while the Roach yard reorganized as the Delaware River Iron Ship Building and Engine Works.

Chicago was launched at Chester on 5 December 1885 at the Delaware River Iron Ship Building and Engine Works, sponsored by Edith Cleborne, the daughter of U.S. Navy Medical Director Cuthbert J. Cleborne. Chicago was commissioned on 17 April 1889.

=== Rebuilds and refits ===
Between 1895 and 1899 Chicago was refitted at the New York Navy Yard, with her main batteries replaced by four new 8-inch (203 mm)/35 caliber Mark 4 guns, and with all secondary 6-inch and 5-inch guns replaced by fourteen new 5-inch (127 mm)/40 caliber Mark 3 guns. She had her sails removed, boilers replaced by six Babcock & Wilcox and four cylindrical boilers, and engines replaced with two horizontal triple-expansion engines totaling 9,000 ihp (6,700 kW) for 18 kn (21 mph; 33 km/h) speed. In 1902 she was partially reconstructed, with an extended armored deck and increased displacement of 5,000 long tons (5,080 t). In 1915 as a training ship she was rearmed with twelve 4-inch (102 mm)/40 caliber guns, and in 1918 as a flagship with four 5-inch (127 mm)/51 caliber guns. In 1920, as a submarine tender at Pearl Harbor, she was disarmed.

"U.S.S. Chicago, one of the crew"

== Service history ==
=== Pre-World War I ===
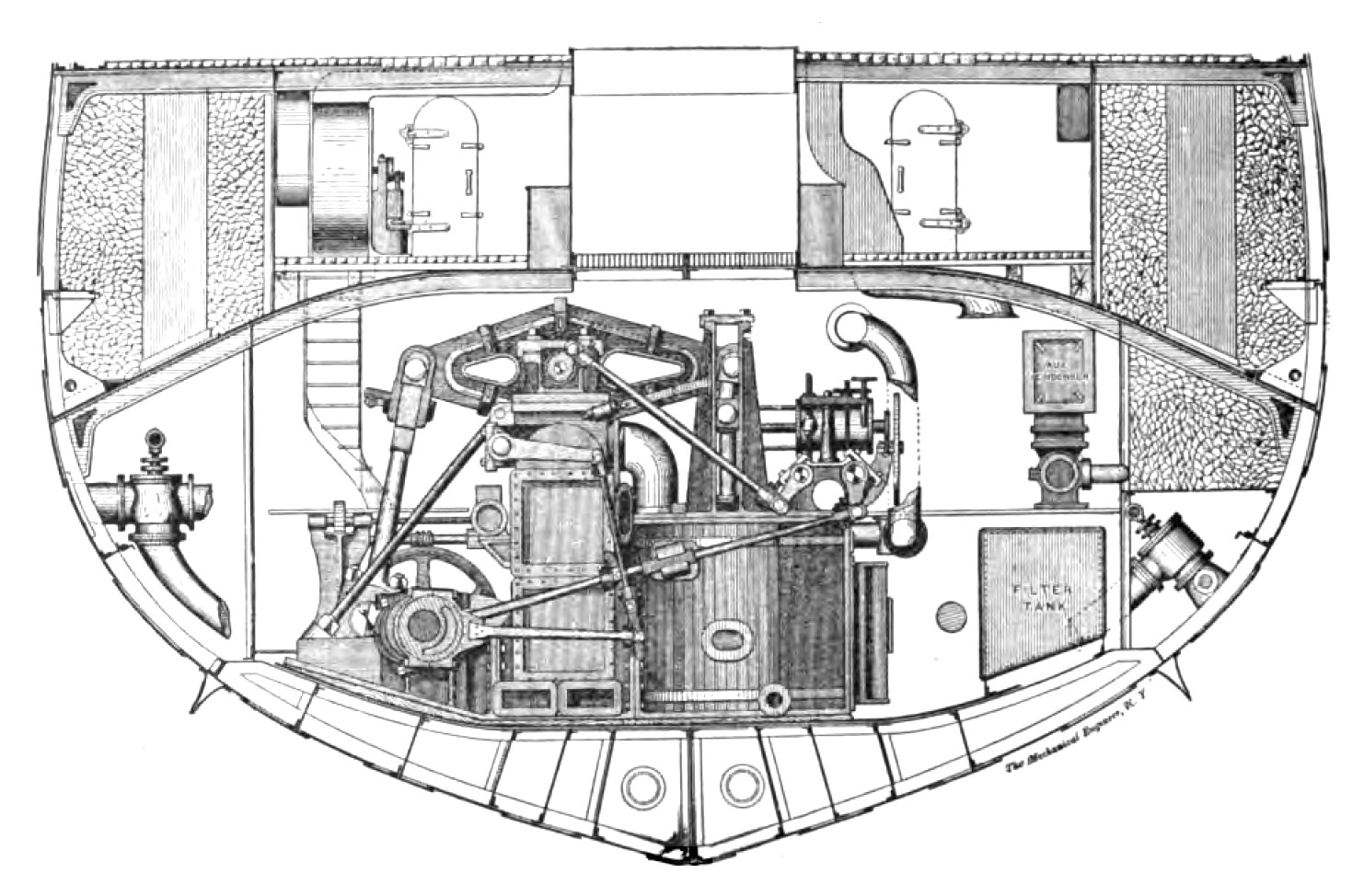
Illustration of one of Chicago's two original beam-propeller engines. Chicago was a twin-screw ship; a similar engine drove the screw on the other side of the vessel.

On 7 December 1889, Chicago departed Boston for Lisbon, Portugal, arriving on 21 December. The cruiser served in European and Mediterranean waters as the flagship of the Squadron of Evolution until 31 May 1890, when she sailed from Funchal, Madeira to call at Brazilian, Venezuelan and West Indian ports before returning to New York on 29 July.

Chicago operated along the east coasts of North and South America and in the Caribbean as flagship of the Squadron of Evolution—and later as flagship of the North Atlantic Squadron—until 1893. After taking part in the International Naval Review in Hampton Roads in April, she left New York on 18 June 1893 to cruise in European and Mediterranean waters as flagship of the European station. During this period the ship was commanded by Alfred Thayer Mahan, already famous as a naval strategist. Chicago returned to New York on 20 March 1895, and was placed out of commission there on 1 May.

Recommissioned on 1 December 1898, Chicago made a short cruise in the Caribbean before sailing for the European Station on 18 April. She returned to New York on 27 September and participated in the naval parade and Dewey celebration of 2 October 1899. Chicago sailed from New York on 25 November for an extended cruise, as flagship of the South Atlantic Station until early July 1901, then as flagship of the European Station. With the squadron, she cruised in northern European, Mediterranean, and Caribbean waters until 1 August 1903, when she proceeded to Oyster Bay, New York, and the Presidential Review.

From 3 December 1903 – 15 August 1904, Chicago was out of commission at Boston undergoing repairs. After operating along the northeast coast, the cruiser departed Newport News on 17 November for Valparaíso, Chile, arriving on 28 December. There, on 1 January 1905, she relieved the armored cruiser New York as flagship of the Pacific Squadron and for three years operated off the west coasts of North and South America, in the Caribbean, and to Hawaii. In 1906, she played a key role in the evacuation of San Francisco during the 1906 San Francisco earthquake. Arriving from San Diego at 6pm on 19 April, Chicago's radio allowed the city's leadership to communicate with the outside world, as telephone and telegraph lines were down. A group of two officers and sixteen enlisted men from Chicago supervised waterborne evacuation efforts. The removal of 20,000 refugees to Tiburon in Marin County by this ship and numerous other vessels is said to be unparalleled and unsurpassed until the 1940 evacuation of Dunkirk.

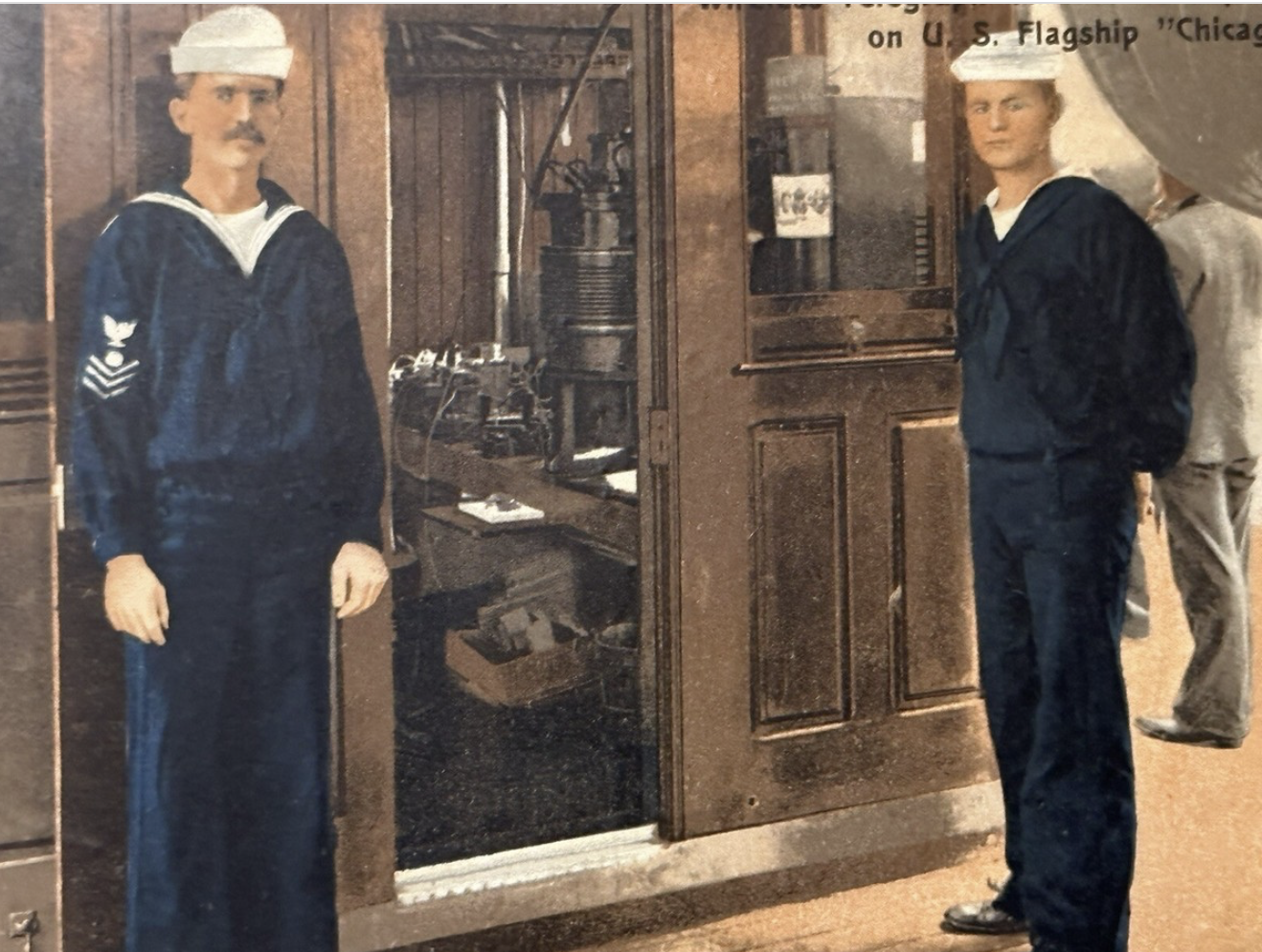
Protective Cruiser USS Chicago's Telegraph Office

On 8 January 1908, Chicago departed San Diego for the east coast and in May joined the Naval Academy Practice Squadron for the summer cruise along the northeast coast until 27 August, when she went into reserve. Chicago was recommissioned the next summer (14 May – 28 August 1909) to operate with the Practice Squadron along the east coast, then returned to Annapolis. On 4 January 1910, she left the Academy for Boston, arriving on 23 January. She then served "in commission in reserve" with the Massachusetts Naval Militia until 12 April 1916, and with the Naval Force of Pennsylvania from 26 April 1916 – April 1917.

=== World War I and beyond ===
On 6 April 1917, Chicago was placed in full commission at Philadelphia and reported to Submarine Force, Atlantic (COMSUBLANT) as flagship at New London, Connecticut, commanded by future Admiral Thomas C. Hart. On 10 July 1919, she departed New York to join Cruiser Division 2 (CruDiv 2), as flagship in the Pacific. She was reclassified CA-14 in 1920 and then CL-14 in 1921. From December 1919 – September 1923, she served with SubDiv 14 and as tender at the Naval Submarine Base Pearl Harbor.

Chicago was decommissioned at Pearl Harbor on 30 September 1923 and served as a receiving ship at Naval Submarine Base Pearl Harbor until 1935. On 16 July 1928 she was renamed Alton to free the name Chicago for the heavy cruiser USS Chicago (CA-29) and was reclassified as an "unclassified miscellaneous unit" (IX-5).

Alton was sold on 15 May 1936. She foundered in mid-Pacific on 8 July 1936 while being towed from Honolulu to San Francisco for delivery to her buyers.

== Gallery ==
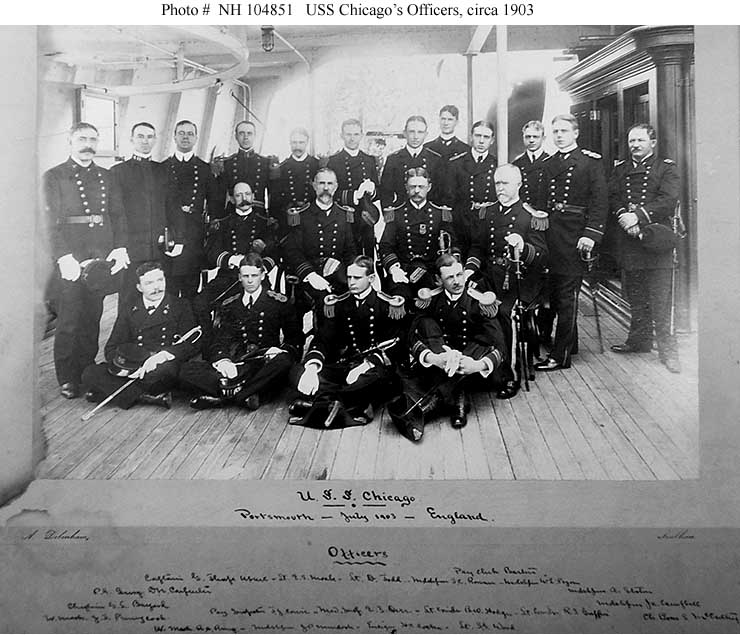
Officers of USS Chicago, photographed on her deck c. 1903

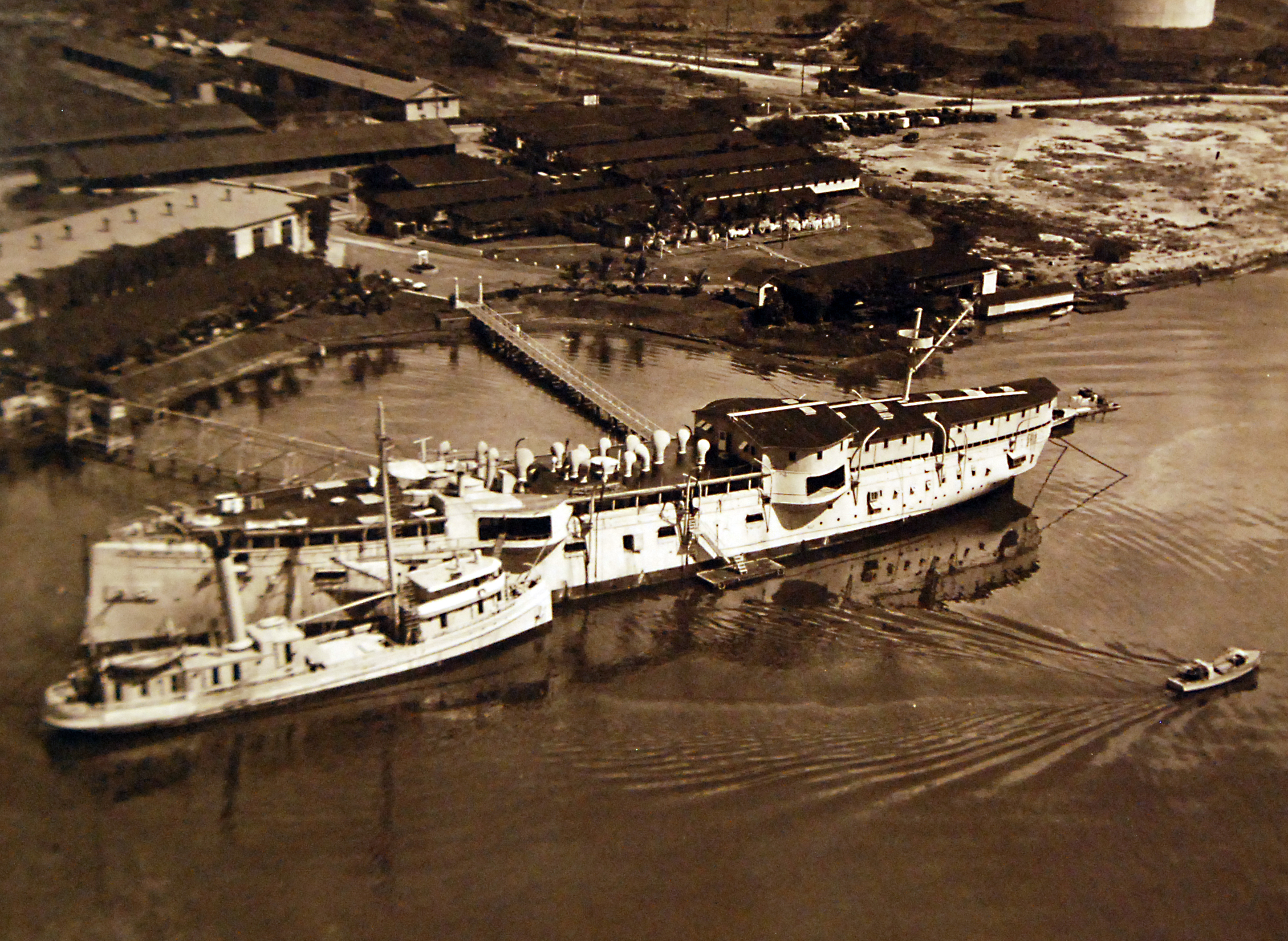
Chicago as barracks ship USS Alton (IX-5) at Pearl Harbor, 1926

== Bibliography ==
- Rentfrow, James C. Home Squadron: The U.S. Navy on the North Atlantic Station. Annapolis, Maryland: Naval Institute Press, 2014. ISBN 1-61251-447-2 OCLC 865711810
- Spears, John Randolph. A History of the United States Navy. New York: C. Scribner's Sons, 1908. OCLC 3467048
- Taylor, Michael J.H. (1990). Jane's Fighting Ships of World War I. Studio. ISBN 1-85170-378-0.
- The White Squadron. Toledo, Ohio: Woolson Spice Co., 1891. OCLC 45112425
