= USS Boston (1884) =

Early U.S. Navy "ABCD" ship

Coordinates: 37.741°N 122.583°W

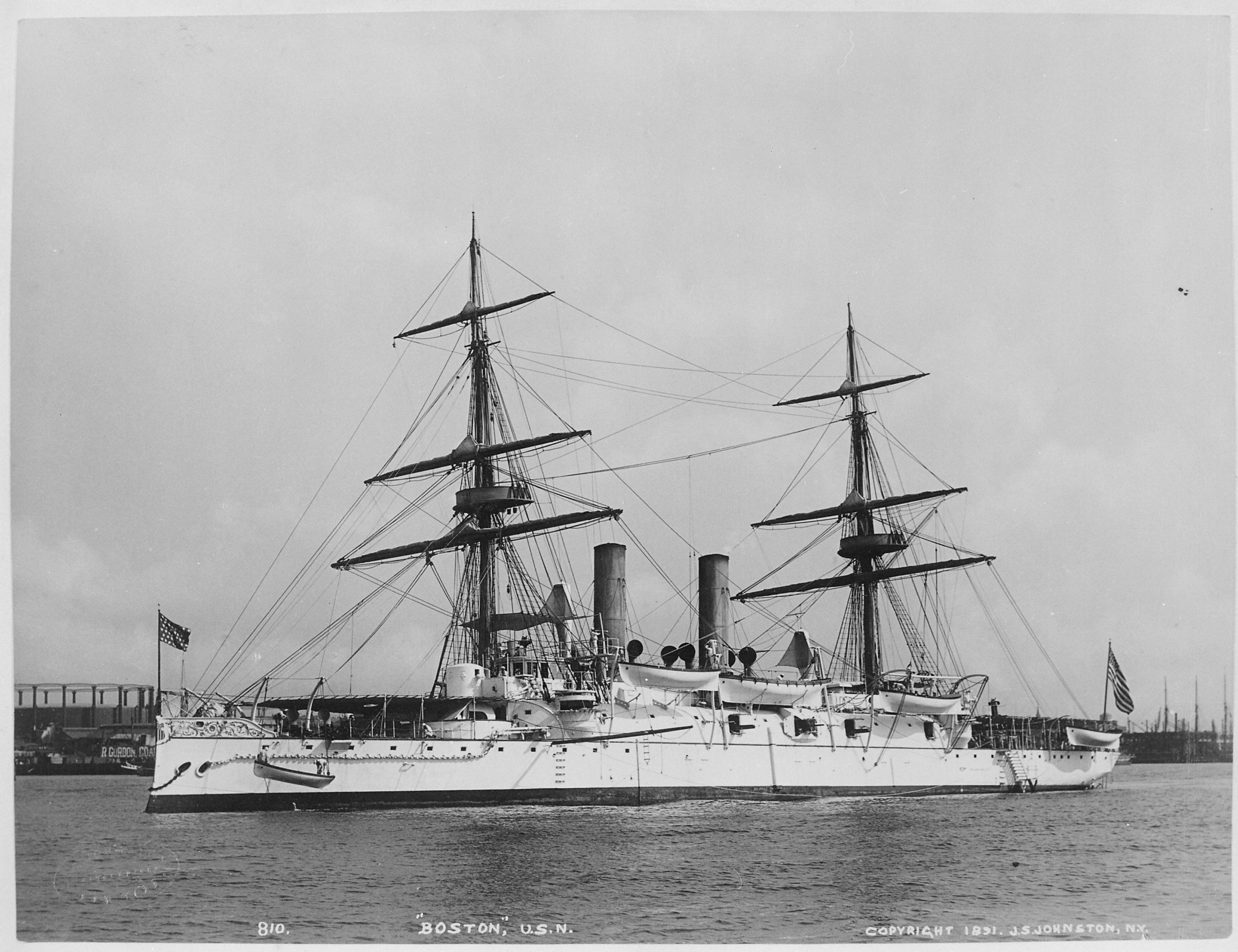
- USS Boston in 1891

History

United States
- Name: Boston
- Namesake: Boston, Massachusetts
- Ordered: 23 July 1883
- Builder: John Roach & Sons, Chester, Pennsylvania; New York Navy Yard, Brooklyn, New York
- Laid down: 15 November 1883
- Launched: 4 December 1884
- Commissioned: 2 May 1887
- Decommissioned: 4 November 1893
- Recommissioned: 15 November 1895
- Decommissioned: 15 September 1899
- Recommissioned: 11 August 1902
- Decommissioned: 10 June 1907
- Recommissioned: 18 June 1918
- Fate: Scuttled 7 April 1946
- Notes: On loan to Oregon Naval Militia 15 June 1911 – September 1916; On loan to United States Shipping Board 24 May 1917 – June 1918

General characteristics
- Type: Protected cruiser
- Displacement: 3,189 long tons (3,240 t)
- Length: 283 ft (86.3 m)
- Beam: 42 ft (12.8 m)
- Draft: 17 ft (5.2 m)
- Installed power: 8 × boilers; 1 × horizontal compound engine; 3,500 ihp (2,600 kW)
- Propulsion: Sails (as built); 1 × shaft
- Speed: 16.3 kn (18.8 mph; 30.2 km/h) on trials, 13 kn (15 mph; 24 km/h) designed
- Range: 3,390 nmi (6,280 km; 3,900 mi) at 10 kn (19 km/h; 12 mph)
- Complement: 284 officers and men
- Armament: 2 × 8-inch (203 mm)/30 caliber Mark 1 guns; 6 × 6-inch (152 mm)/30 caliber Mark 2 guns; 2 × 6-pounder (57 mm (2.24 in)) guns; 2 × 3-pounder (47 mm (1.85 in)) Hotchkiss revolving cannon; 2 × 1-pounder (37 mm (1.46 in)) Hotchkiss revolving cannon; 2 × .45 caliber (11.4 mm) Gatling guns
- Armor: Barbettes: 2 in (51 mm); Deck: 1.5 in (38 mm); Conning tower: 2 in (51 mm)
- Notes: One of the U.S. Navy's first four steel ships

The fifth USS Boston was a United States Navy protected cruiser and one of the first steel warships of the "New Navy" of the 1880s. In some references she is combined with Atlanta as the Atlanta class, in others as the Boston class.

== Construction and commissioning ==
Boston was ordered as one of the steel-hulled "ABCD" ships, the others being the protected cruisers Atlanta and Chicago and the dispatch vessel Dolphin. All were ordered from the same shipyard, John Roach & Sons of Chester, Pennsylvania. Boston was laid down on 15 November 1883 by Delaware River Iron Ship Building and Engine Works, Chester, Pennsylvania, and launched on 4 December 1884. However, when United States Secretary of the Navy William C. Whitney initially refused to accept Dolphin, claiming her design was defective, the Roach yard went bankrupt and Boston was completed at the New York Navy Yard in Brooklyn, New York, which had little experience with steel-hulled ships. She was commissioned on 2 May 1887 at the New York Navy Yard with Captain Francis M. Ramsay in command.

== Design ==
As-built armament included two 8-inch (203 mm)/30 caliber Mark 1 guns, six 6-inch (152 mm)/30 caliber Mark 2 guns, two 6-pounder (57 mm (2.24 in)) guns, two 3-pounder (47 mm (1.85 in)) Hotchkiss revolving cannon, two 1-pounder (37 mm (1.46 in)) Hotchkiss revolving cannon, and two .45 caliber (11.4 mm) Gatling guns. The 8-inch guns were initially in open barbettes with gun shields added later.

Armor protection was light, with 2-inch (50.8 mm) gun shields and conning tower, and a 1.5-inch (38.1 mm) deck extending 100 feet (30 m) over the machinery spaces.

The engineering plant included eight coal-fired cylindrical boilers producing 100 psi (690 kPa) steam and a horizontal compound engine producing 3,500 ihp (2,600 kW) driving one shaft. Like the other "ABCD" ships, Boston was built with a sail rig to increase cruising range, later removed. The ship carried up to 490 tons of coal, with a cruising range as built of 3,390 nmi (6,280 km; 3,900 mi) at 10 kn (19 km/h; 12 mph).

=== Refits ===
In 1900–01 Boston was rebuilt and the 6-inch guns were converted to rapid firing with brass case ammunition replacing powder bags. During her service with the Oregon Naval Militia 1911-16 she retained her original pair of 8"/30 guns and three of the 6"/30 guns, with a single 4-inch (102 mm)/40 caliber gun added. All armament was removed prior to her conversion to a freighter in 1917.

== Service history ==
Boston, being the second cruiser of the New Navy completed, was not ready for active service until 1888. She then made a cruise to Guatemala and Haiti to protect American citizens. She joined the Squadron of Evolution on 30 September 1889 and cruised to the Mediterranean and South America from 7 December 1889 to 29 July 1890, and along the east coast in 1891. Boston departed New York on 24 October 1891 for the Pacific via Cape Horn, arriving at San Francisco on 2 May 1892. Except for a prospective Pacific Squadron commanding officer's cruise to the Hawaiian Islands from 11 August 1892 to 10 October 1893 (in which she provided a shore party in January 1893 that bolstered the overthrow of the Hawaiian monarchy), she remained on the West Coast until laid up at Mare Island Navy Yard on 4 November 1893.

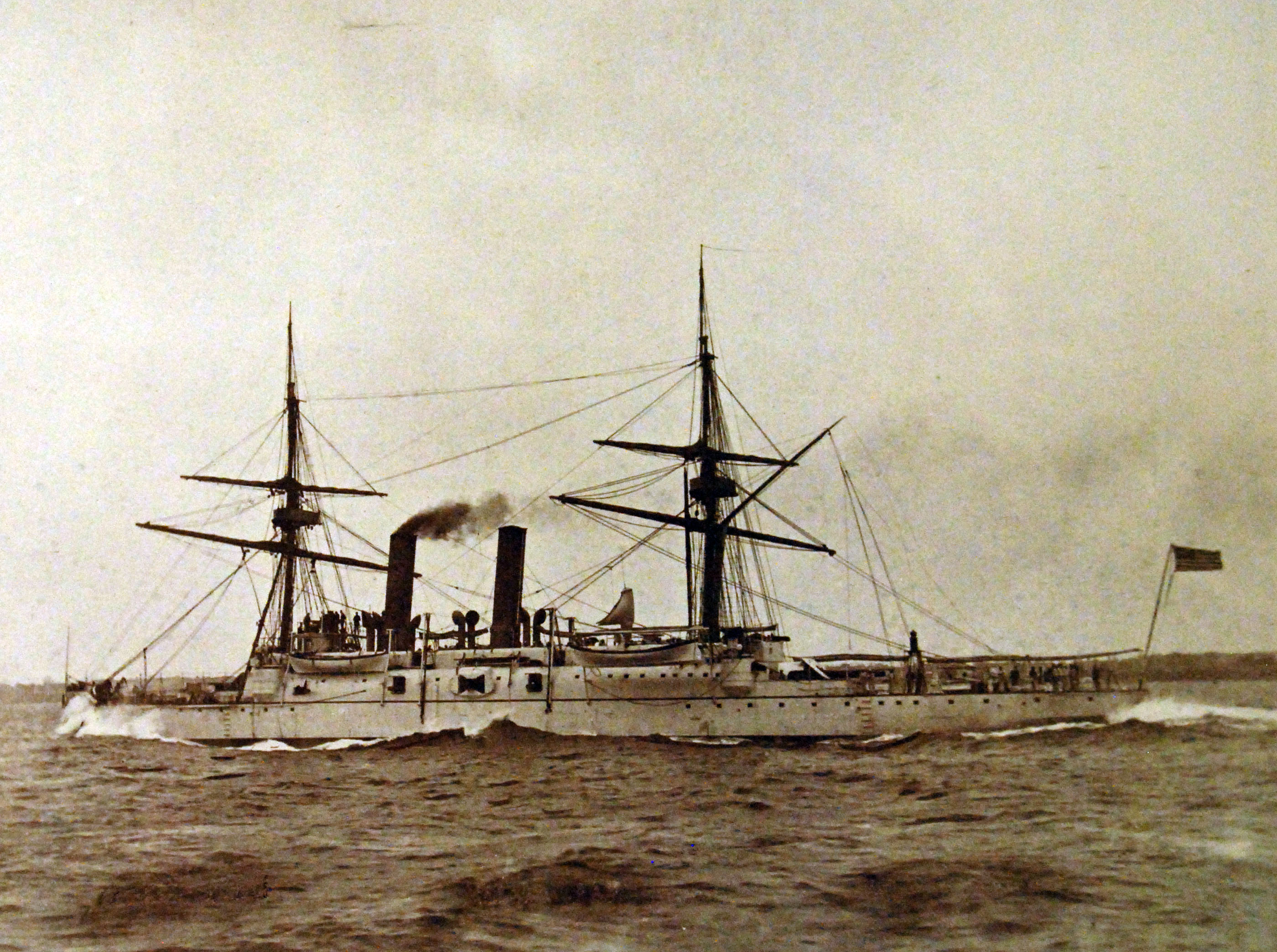
Boston during speed trials

Recommissioned on 15 November 1895, Boston joined the Asiatic Squadron at Yokohama, Japan on 25 February 1896. She remained in East Asia protecting American interests for the next four years and during the Spanish–American War took part in the Battle of Manila Bay on 1 May 1898 and the capture of Manila on 13 August 1898. From 4 October to 23 December, Boston and other ships deployed to Taku in China to protect American interests in the wake of a coup d'etat by the Empress Dowager Cixi. Following this, Boston remained in the Philippines assisting in their pacification until 8 June 1899. Sometime during this overseas deployment, Boston's distinctive sail rig was removed. This is evidence by a photograph taken in 1899 of Boston in the Philippines with pole masts but no cross rigging.

Boston returned to San Francisco on 9 August 1899 and went out of commission at Mare Island Navy Yard on 15 September 1899. She remained out of commission until 11 August 1902 and then rejoined the Pacific Squadron. On 7 November 1903, Boston was the first ship of the Pacific Squadron to arrive near Panama to support that country's newly declared independence; a key event in the creation of the Panama Canal. She then cruised in South America, Hawaii, and the US West Coast. From 16 to 25 June 1905, she helped represent the Navy at the Lewis and Clark Centennial Exposition at Portland, Oregon, and from 23 April – 10 May 1906 she helped care for the victims of the San Francisco earthquake and fire. In April 1907 she carried a Honduran peace delegation that ended the Honduran–Nicaraguan War. She went out of commission again at Puget Sound Navy Yard on 10 June 1907. From 15 June 1911 to September 1916, she served as a training vessel with the Oregon Naval Militia.

With the United States declaration of war on Germany in April 1917, Boston was loaned to the United States Shipping Board from 24 May 1917 – June 1918. Boston was converted to a freighter by Seattle Construction & Drydock in 1917–1918. Her guns were most likely removed when she was laid up at Bremerton between September 1916 and March 1917. On 18 June 1918, she was recommissioned at Mare Island Navy Yard as a receiving ship and towed to Yerba Buena Island, California, where she served as a receiving ship until 1940. She was renamed Despatch, the sixth U.S. Navy ship to bear that name, on 9 August 1940, thus freeing her original name for use on the new heavy cruiser Boston (CA-69). From 1940 to October 1945, she was used as a radio school. The old ship was redesignated IX-2 on 17 February 1941. Despatch was towed to sea and sunk off San Francisco on 7 April 1946.

== Legacy ==
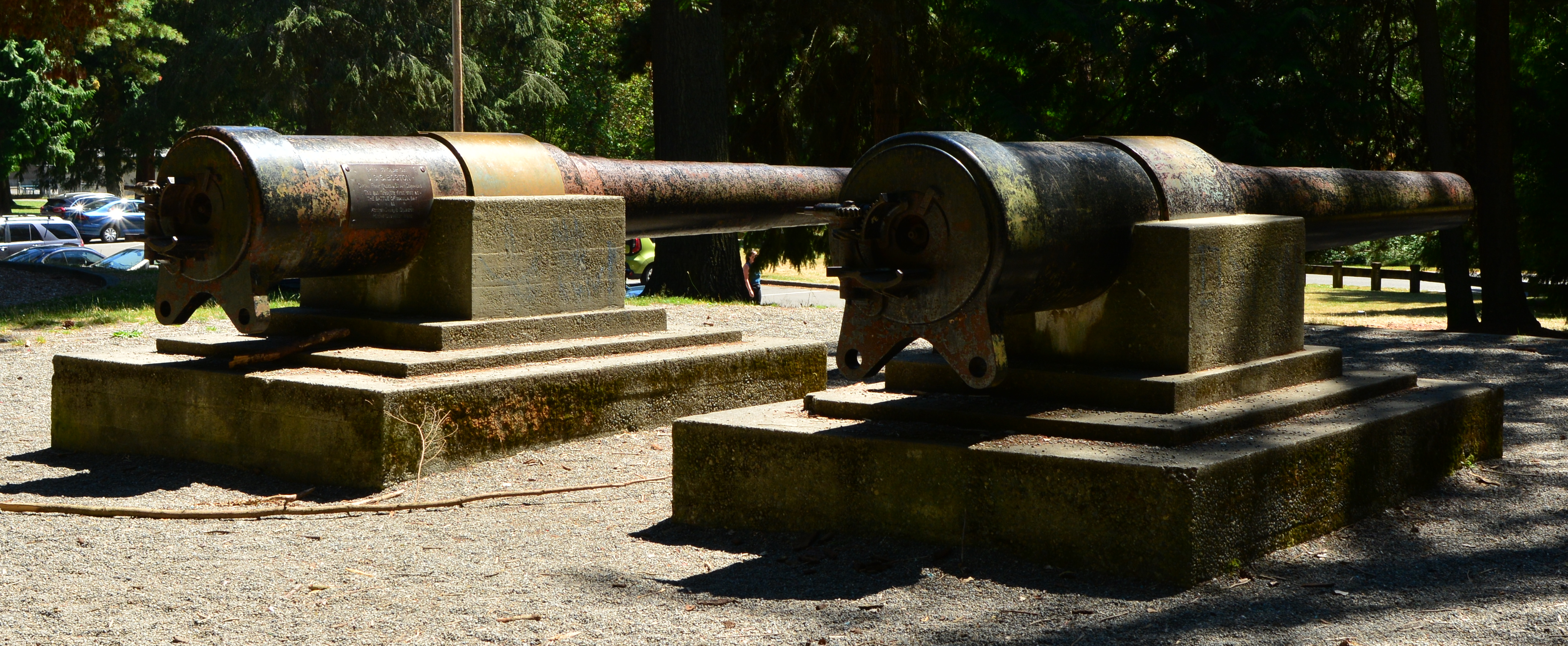
The two 8-inch, 30-Caliber guns displayed in Hamlin ParkShoreline, Washington, seen in 2020.

Both of Boston's 8-inch (203 mm)/30-caliber guns were placed at the new Seattle Naval Hospital in 1942. After the hospital closed, the guns went with the site to the new Firlands Sanitarium owned by King County in 1947. At some point after 1952, the guns were moved to Hamlin Park, in Shoreline, Washington. However, county records do not indicate when the guns were placed in the park or why it was done. Of the two guns displayed at Hamlin Park, the easternmost gun bears a plaque which states that the gun fired the first shot of the Battle of Manila Bay. The other bears a plaque crediting the gun with the dismounting of three guns at the Spanish fort of Cavite.

== Awards ==
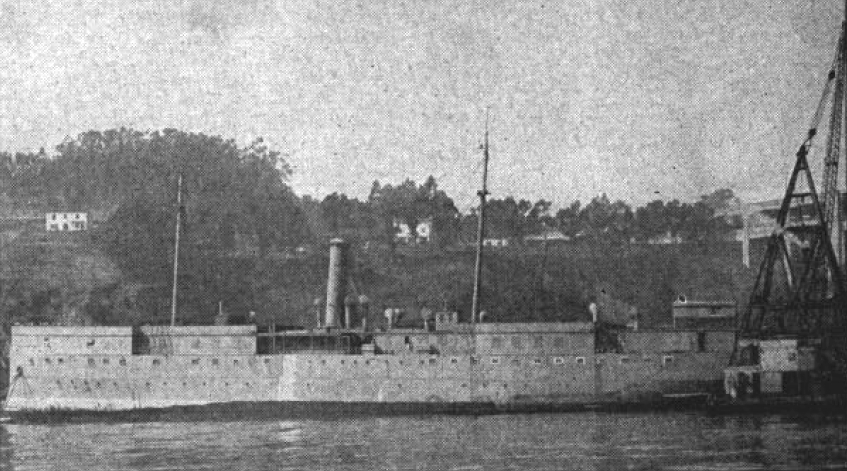
Despatch at Yerba Buena Island in San Francisco Bay in 1946.

Boston/Despatch earned the following awards in her career, spanning six decades:

- Battle of Manila Bay Commemorative Medal (also known as the "Dewey Medal")
- Navy Expeditionary Medal (two awards)
- Spanish Campaign Medal
- Philippine Campaign Medal
- World War I Victory Medal
- American Defense Service Medal
- American Campaign Medal
- World War II Victory Medal

== Bibliography ==
- Bauer, K. Jack; Roberts, Stephen S. (1991). Register of Ships of the U.S. Navy, 1775–1990: Major Combatants. Westport, Connecticut: Greenwood Press. ISBN 0-313-26202-0.
- Burr, Lawrence. US Cruisers 1883–1904: The Birth of the Steel Navy. Oxford: Osprey, 2008. ISBN 1-84603-267-9 OCLC 488657946
- Friedman, Norman (1984). U.S. Cruisers: An Illustrated Design History. Annapolis, Maryland: United States Naval Institute. ISBN 0-87021-718-6.
- Gardiner, Robert; Chesneau, Roger (1979). Conway's All the World's Fighting Ships 1860–1905. New York: Mayflower Books. ISBN 0-8317-0302-4.
- Gibbons, Tony (2007). The Encyclopedia of Ships. London: Amber Books Ltd. ISBN 978-1-905704-43-9. OCLC 516430596.
- Rentfrow, James C. Home Squadron: The U.S. Navy on the North Atlantic Station. Annapolis, Maryland: Naval Institute Press, 2014. ISBN 1-61251-447-2 OCLC 865711810
- Spears, John Randolph. A History of the United States Navy. New York: C. Scribner's Sons, 1908. OCLC 3467048
- The White Squadron. Toledo, Ohio: Woolson Spice Co., 1891. OCLC 45112425
- The White Squadron: Armed Cruisers, U.S.N. New York: International Art Publ. Co, 1800. OCLC 271460419
- The White Squadron of the U S Navy. New York: James Clarke Publisher, 1894. OCLC 50490393
