= Bofors 57 mm gun =

The Bofors 57 mm gun is a nickname or designation given to several types of guns designed and developed by the Swedish company Bofors:

- Bofors 57 mm anti-tank gun, a 57 mm anti-tank gun for the Swedish army during WW2.
- Bofors 57 mm Automatic Gun L/50, a 57 mm × 230 mm aircraft autocannon for the Saab T 18B torpedo bomber.
- Bofors 57 mm Naval Automatic Gun L/60, a twin barreled 57 mm x 438 mm naval artillery gun/anti air autocannon based on the design of the Bofors 40 mm L/60 anti air gun.
- Bofors 57 mm Automatic Anti-Aircraft Gun L/60, a single barreled 57 mm x 438 mm anti air autocannon based on the dual barreled Bofors 57 mm L/60 naval artillery gun.
- Bofors 57 mm Naval Automatic Gun L/70, a single barreled 57 mm x 438 mm dual-purpose autocannon to replace the 57 mm L/60. Exists in several main variants ranging from Mark 1 to 3 (The Mark 3 is named Mark 110 in United States service).

== Other equivalent disambiguation pages ==
- Bofors 40 mm gun
- Bofors 120 mm gun
