= 6-inch/30-caliber gun =

6"/30 caliber Mark 1, 2, and 3
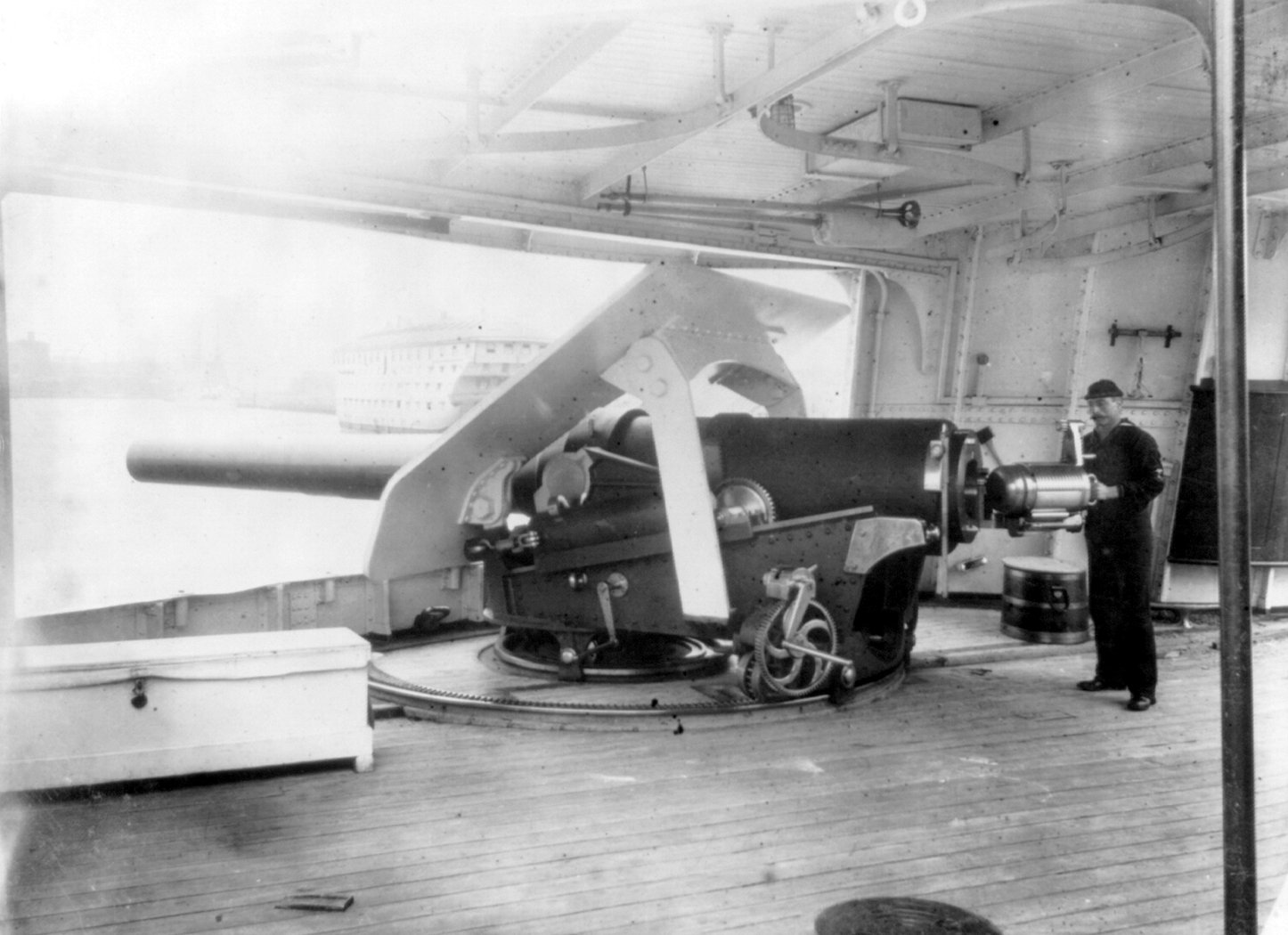
- Atlanta, 6-inch/30 caliber gun.
- Type: Naval gun
- Place of origin: United States

Service history
- In service: 1885
- Used by: United States Navy
- Wars: Spanish–American War; Philippine–American War; World War I

Production history
- Designer: Bureau of Ordnance
- Designed: 1883
- Manufacturer: U.S. Naval Gun Factory
- No. built: Mark 1: 1; Mark 2: 20; Mark 3: 109
- Variants: Mark 1, Mark 2 Mod 1 – Mod 3, Mark 3 Mod 0 – Mod 9

Specifications
- Mass: Mark 1: 11,010 lb (4,990 kg) (without breech); Mark 2: 10,430 lb (4,730 kg)
- Length: Mark 1: 189.7 in (4,820 mm); Mark 2: 193.53 in (4,916 mm); Mark 3 Mod 0 and Mod 3: 196 in (5,000 mm); Mark 3 Mod 1: 226 in (5,700 mm); Mark 3 Mod 2 and Mod 8: 256 in (6,500 mm)
- Barrel length: 30 Caliber: 180 in (4,600 mm) bore (30 calibers); 35 Caliber: 210 in (5,300 mm) bore (35); 40 Caliber: 240 in (6,100 mm) bore (40)
- Shell: 105 lb (48 kg) naval armor-piercing
- Caliber: 6 in (152 mm)
- Elevation: Mark 3: −7° to +12° (early units); Mark 3: −10° to +12° (later units)
- Traverse: −150° to +150°
- Rate of fire: As commissioned: 0.66 rounds per minute (bag guns); After 1906: 7.3 rounds per minute (bag guns); As commissioned: 1.5 rounds per minute (case guns); After 1906: 7.6 rounds per minute (case guns)
- Muzzle velocity: 1,950 ft/s (590 m/s) 30 caliber; 2,000 ft/s (610 m/s) 35 caliber; 2,150 ft/s (660 m/s) 40 caliber
- Effective firing range: 9,000 yd (8,200 m) at 15.3° elevation; 18,000 yd (16,000 m) at 30.2° elevation

The 6"/30 caliber gun Mark 1 (spoken "six-inch-thirty-caliber") were used for the primary battery of the United States Navy's dispatch vessel Dolphin with the Mark 2 being used in the secondary batteries for its "New Navy" protected cruisers Atlanta, Chicago, and Boston and the Mark 3 used for the primary and secondary batteries in the succeeding early protected cruisers in addition to secondary batteries in the "Second Class Battleships" Maine and Texas.

== Design ==
The 6-inch/30 caliber Mark 1, 2, and 3 guns were developed before the Spanish–American War and still used black powder or brown powder, in later years they were not considered strong enough to withstand the higher chamber pressures generated by the newer smokeless powder adopted around 1898 and were obsolete before the start of World War I.

The Mark 1, gun No. 1, was constructed of tube, jacket, 16 hoops, an elevating band, and integral trunnions with a screwed-on muzzle bell. The Mark 2 also trunnioned with the Mark 2 Mod 1, which had only 10 hoops, a jacket, and a chamber liner; the Mod 2 was the same, but with a full-length liner. All Mark 1 and Mark 2 guns were constructed to a length of 30 calibers. In 1895, all Mark 2s were ordered to be converted to rapid-fire, fixed ammunition. This was done in 1898–1902 with gun No. 2 being delivered in November 1898 for use in Atlanta.

The Mark 3 was trunnioned as the Mark 1 and Mark 2, but was built in three different caliber lengths, 30, 35, and 40, in eight different Mods, Mod 0 – Mod 6, and Mods 8 and 9. Mod 0 was 30-caliber, with Mod 1 being 35-caliber. All 30- and 35-caliber Mods had a liner, 10 hoops, and a jacket. Mod 2 was a 40 caliber with only eight hoops. Mod 3 was again 30 caliber but introduced the use of case (semi-fixed) ammunition. The Mod 4 was experimental in that it eliminated the trunnions and used a threaded sleeve. Mod 5s were reworked, enabling Mod 1s to handle case ammunition. As with the Mod 5, the Mod 6 was a Mod 2 reworked to handle case ammunition. The Mod 7 was skipped, and no drawings exist for this Mod. The Mod 8 was another Mod 2 rework, this time removing the trunnions and replacing them with a threaded sleeve. The last Mod was Mod 9, using a Mod 3 gun and a full-length liner.

== Naval Service ==
Ship	Gun Installed	Gun Mount
USS Dolphin (PG-24)	Mark 1: 6"/30 caliber	Mark 1: 1 × shifting pivot
USS Atlanta (1884)	Mark 2: 6"/30 caliber	Mark 2: 6 × muzzle pivot mount
USS Boston (1884)	Mark 2: 6"/30 caliber	Mark 2: 6 × muzzle pivot mount
USS Chicago (1885)	Mark 2: 6"/30 caliber	Mark 2: 8 × muzzle pivot mount
USS Maine (ACR-1)	Mark 3: 6"/30 caliber	Mark 3: 6 × central-pivot
USS Texas (1892)	Mark 3: 4 × 6"/30 caliber; Mark 3: 2 × 6"/35 caliber	Mark 4: 6 × central-pivot w/single-piece slide
USS Newark (C-1)	Mark 3: 6"/30 caliber (as built); Mark 3: 6"/40 caliber (refit 1901–1902)	Mark 3: 12 × central-pivot
USS Charleston (C-2)	Mark 3: 6"/30 caliber	Mark 3: 6 × central-pivot
USS Baltimore (C-3)	Mark 3: 6"/30 caliber	Mark 3: 6 × central-pivot
USS Philadelphia (C-4)	Mark 3: 6"/30 caliber	Mark 3: 12 × central-pivot
USS Columbia (C-12)	Mark 3: 6"/40 caliber	Mark 3: 2 × central-pivot
USS Minneapolis (C-13)	Mark 3: 6"/40 caliber	Mark 3: 2 × central-pivot
USS Yorktown (PG-1)	Mark 3: 6"/30 caliber	Mark 4: 6 × central-pivot w/single-piece slide
USS Petrel (PG-2)	Mark 3: 6"/30 caliber	Mark 4: 6 × central-pivot w/single-piece slide
USS Concord (PG-3)	Mark 3: 6"/30 caliber	Mark 4: 6 × central-pivot w/single-piece slide
USS Bennington (PG-4)	Mark 3: 6"/30 caliber	Mark 4: 6 × central-pivot w/single-piece slide

== Preserved weapons ==
At least five guns of this type are preserved:

- One gun from Maine (ACR-1) in Washington, DC at the National Museum of the United States Navy.
- One gun from Maine (ACR-1) in Portland, Maine at Fort Allen Park.
- One gun from Maine (ACR-1) at the city hall in Alpena, Michigan.
- Two guns from Concord (PG-3) at the Veterans Memorial Museum, Chehalis, Washington.

== See also ==
=== Weapons of comparable role, performance, and era ===
- BL 6 inch gun Mk II – VI approximate British equivalent
