= 5-inch/31-caliber gun =

5"/31 caliber Mark 1 Naval Gun
- Type: Naval gun
- Place of origin: United States

Service history
- In service: 1889–1910
- Used by: United States Navy
- Wars: Spanish–American War

Production history
- Designer: Bureau of Ordnance
- Designed: 1885
- Manufacturer: U.S. Naval Gun Factory
- Produced: 1885
- No. built: 2
- Variants: Mark 1 Mod 0 and 1

Specifications
- Mass: 6,190 lb (2,810 kg) (without breech)
- Length: 159.97 in (4.063 m) Mark 1 Mod 1
- Barrel length: 153.97 in (3.911 m) bore (31 calibers)
- Shell: 50 lb (23 kg)
- Caliber: 5 inches (127 mm)
- Traverse: −150° to +150°
- Rate of fire: 6 rounds per minute
- Muzzle velocity: 2,300 ft/s (700 m/s)
- Maximum firing range: 16,000-yard (14,630 m) at 30° elevation

The 5"/31 caliber gun (spoken "five-inch-thirty-one-caliber") were used in the secondary batteries of the United States Navy's "New Navy" protected cruiser Chicago and later mounted in Panther during the Spanish–American War.

== Design ==
Mark 1, Nos. 1 and 2, were 31 calibers and two of the first steel tube guns that were built entirely in the United States. They were trunnioned guns, no liners and that fired bag ammunition. After the Spanish–American War was over they were modified to Mod 1 in 1901. A liner was inserted in the breech end and the trunnions were cut off. The Mod 1 consisted of tube, jacket, and 9 hoops. After these changes the gun was able to use the same ammunition as the later Mark 2 5-inch gun.

== Naval Service ==
Ship	Gun Installed	Gun Mount
USS Chicago (1885)	Mark 1 Mod 0: 2 × 5"/30 caliber (removed April 1898)	Mark 1: 2 × single mounting with gravity return
USS Panther (1889)	Mark 1 Mod 0: 2 × 5"/30 caliber (installed July 1898)	Unknown
