= USS Atlanta (1884) =

1884 protected cruiser

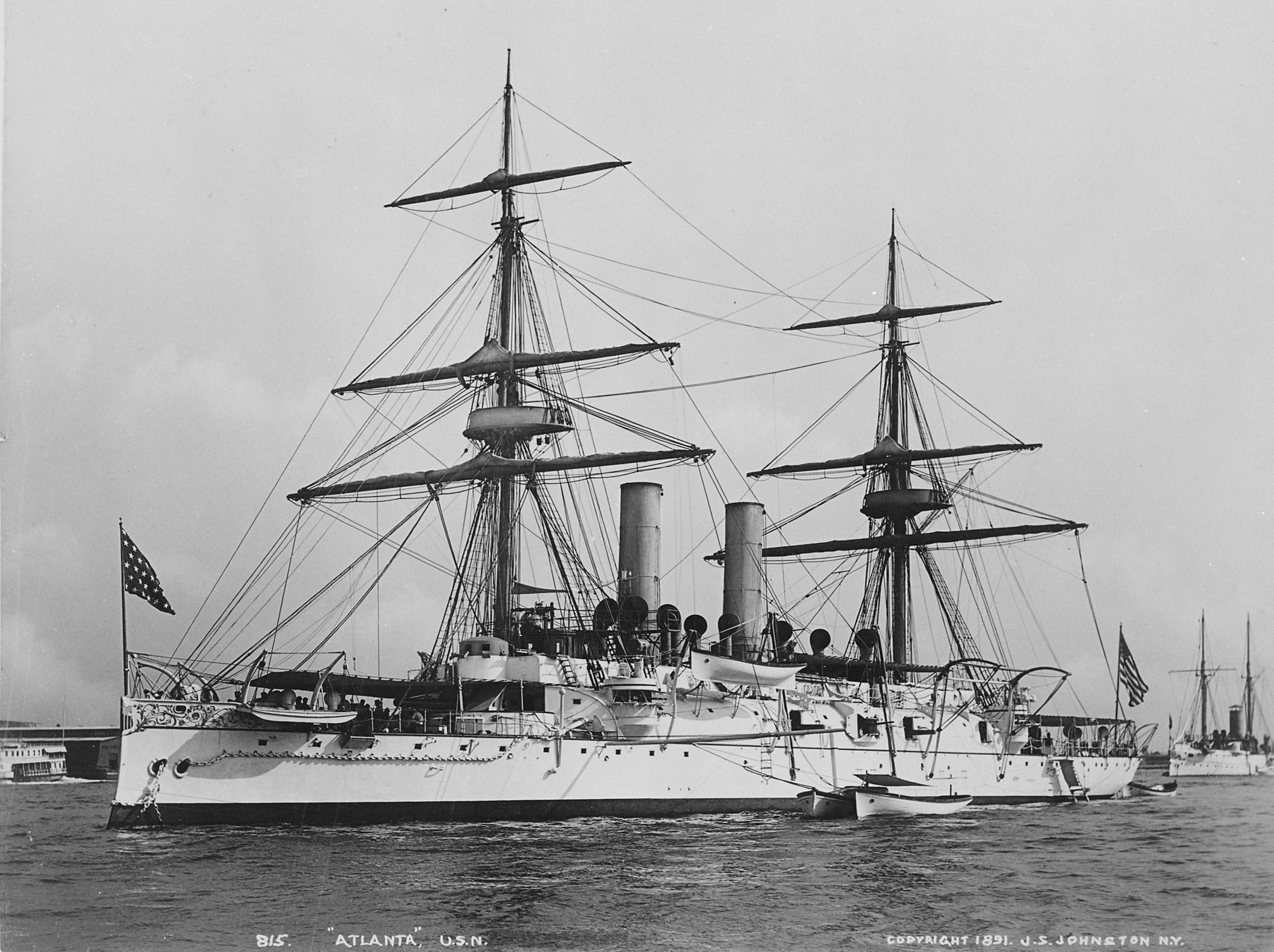
- USS Atlanta in 1891

History

United States
- Name: Atlanta
- Namesake: Atlanta, Georgia
- Ordered: 3 March 1883
- Laid down: 8 November 1883
- Launched: 9 October 1884
- Sponsored by: Jessie Lincoln
- Commissioned: 19 July 1886
- Decommissioned: September 1895
- Recommissioned: 15 September 1900
- Decommissioned: 23 March 1912
- Stricken: 24 April 1912
- Fate: Sold for scrap, 10 June 1912

General characteristics
- Type: Protected cruiser
- Displacement: 3,189 long tons (3,240 t)
- Length: 283 ft 0 in (86.26 m)
- Beam: 42 ft 2 in (12.85 m)
- Draft: 17 ft 0 in (5.18 m)
- Installed power: 8 × boilers; 1 × horizontal compound engine; 3,500 ihp (2,600 kW)
- Propulsion: Sails (as built); 1 × shaft
- Speed: 16.3 kn (18.8 mph; 30.2 km/h) on trials, 13 kn (15 mph; 24 km/h) designed
- Range: 3,390 nmi (6,280 km; 3,900 mi) at 10 kn (19 km/h; 12 mph)
- Complement: 284
- Armament: 2 × 8-inch (203 mm)/30 caliber Mark 1 guns; 6 × 6-inch (152 mm)/30 caliber Mark 2 guns; 2 × 6-pounder (57 mm (2.24 in)) guns; 2 × 3-pounder (47 mm (1.85 in)) Hotchkiss revolving cannon; 2 × 1-pounder (37 mm (1.46 in)) Hotchkiss revolving cannon; 2 × .45 caliber (11.4 mm) Gatling guns
- Armor: Barbettes: 2 in (51 mm); Deck: 1.5 in (38 mm); Conning tower: 2 in (51 mm)
- Notes: One of the U.S. Navy's first four steel ships

USS Atlanta was a protected cruiser and one of the first steel warships of the "New Navy" of the 1880s. In some references she is combined with Boston as the Atlanta class, in others as the Boston class.

Atlanta was laid down on 8 November 1883 at Chester, Pennsylvania by Delaware River Iron Ship Building and Engine Works; launched on 9 October 1884; sponsored by Miss Jessie Lincoln, the daughter of Secretary of War Robert Todd Lincoln and granddaughter of President Abraham Lincoln; and commissioned at the New York Navy Yard on 19 July 1886, Captain Francis M. Bunce in command.

== Design and construction ==
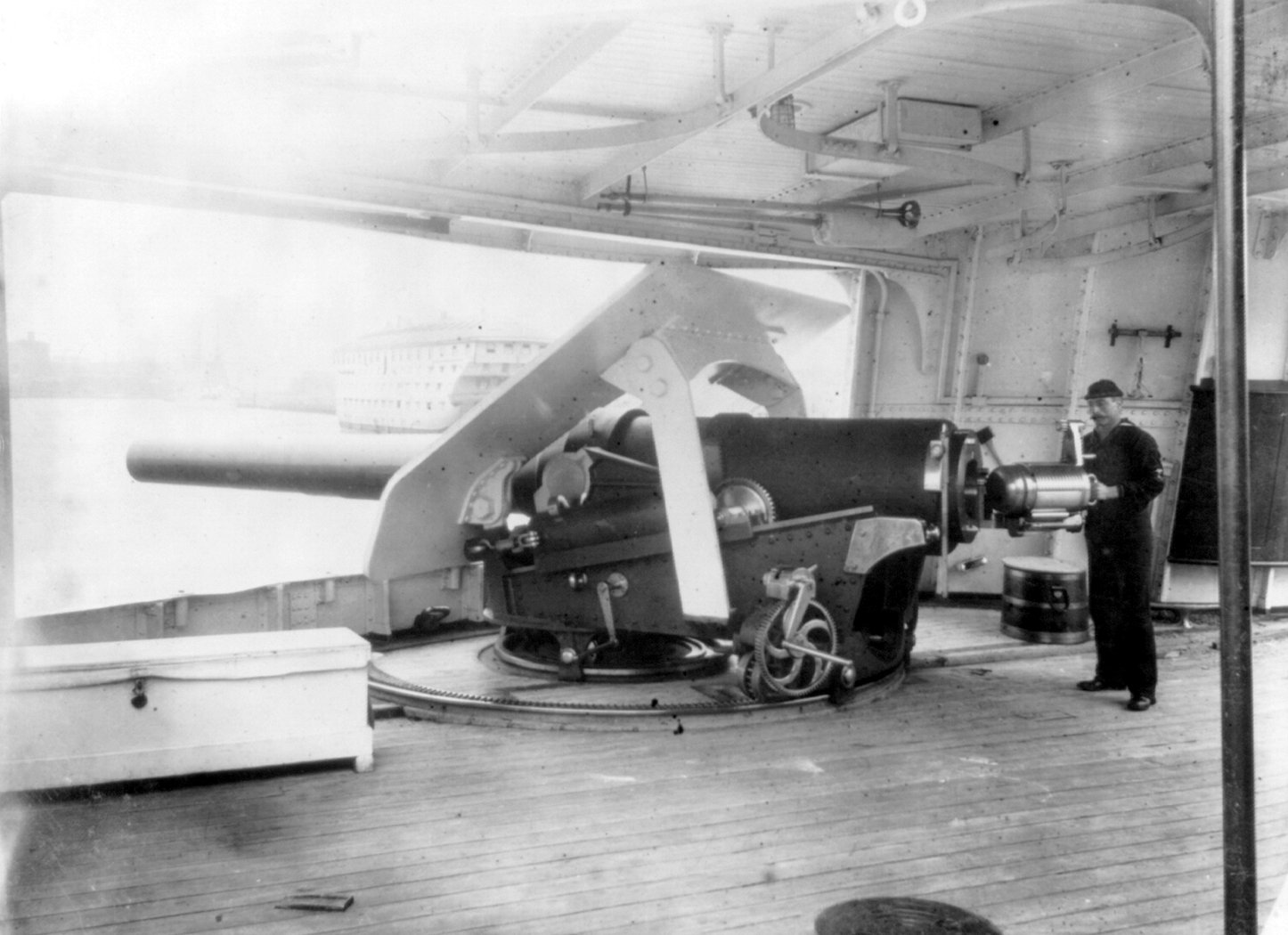
6 inch (152 mm) gun on Atlanta.

Atlanta was ordered as part of the "ABCD" ships, the others being the cruisers Boston and Chicago and the dispatch vessel Dolphin. All were ordered from the same shipyard, John Roach & Sons of Chester, Pennsylvania. However, when Secretary of the Navy William C. Whitney initially refused to accept Dolphin, claiming her design was defective, the Roach yard went bankrupt and Atlanta was completed at the New York Navy Yard, which had little experience with steel-hulled ships.

As-built armament included two 8-inch (203 mm)/30 caliber Mark 1 guns, six 6-inch (152 mm)/30 caliber Mark 2 guns, two 6-pounder (57 mm (2.24 in)) rapid fire guns, two 3-pounder (47 mm (1.85 in)) Hotchkiss revolving cannon, two 1-pounder (37 mm (1.46 in)) Hotchkiss revolving cannon, and two .45 caliber (11.4 mm) Gatling guns. The 8-inch guns were initially in open barbettes with gun shields added later.

Armor protection was light, with 2-inch (50.8 mm) gun shields and conning tower, and a 1.5-inch (38.1 mm) deck extending 100 feet (30 m) over the machinery spaces.

The as-built engineering plant included eight coal-fired cylindrical fire-tube boilers producing 100 psi (690 kPa) steam and a horizontal compound engine producing 3,500 ihp (2,600 kW) driving one shaft. Like the other "ABCD" ships, Atlanta was built with a sail rig to increase cruising range, though it was later removed. The ship carried up to 490 tons of coal, with a cruising range as built of 3,390 nmi (6,280 km; 3,900 mi) at 10 kn (19 km/h; 12 mph).

=== Refit ===
In 1897–1899 Atlanta received a new triple-expansion steam engine of 4,030 ihp (3,010 kW) and the 6-inch guns were converted to rapid firing with brass case ammunition replacing powder bags.

== Service history ==
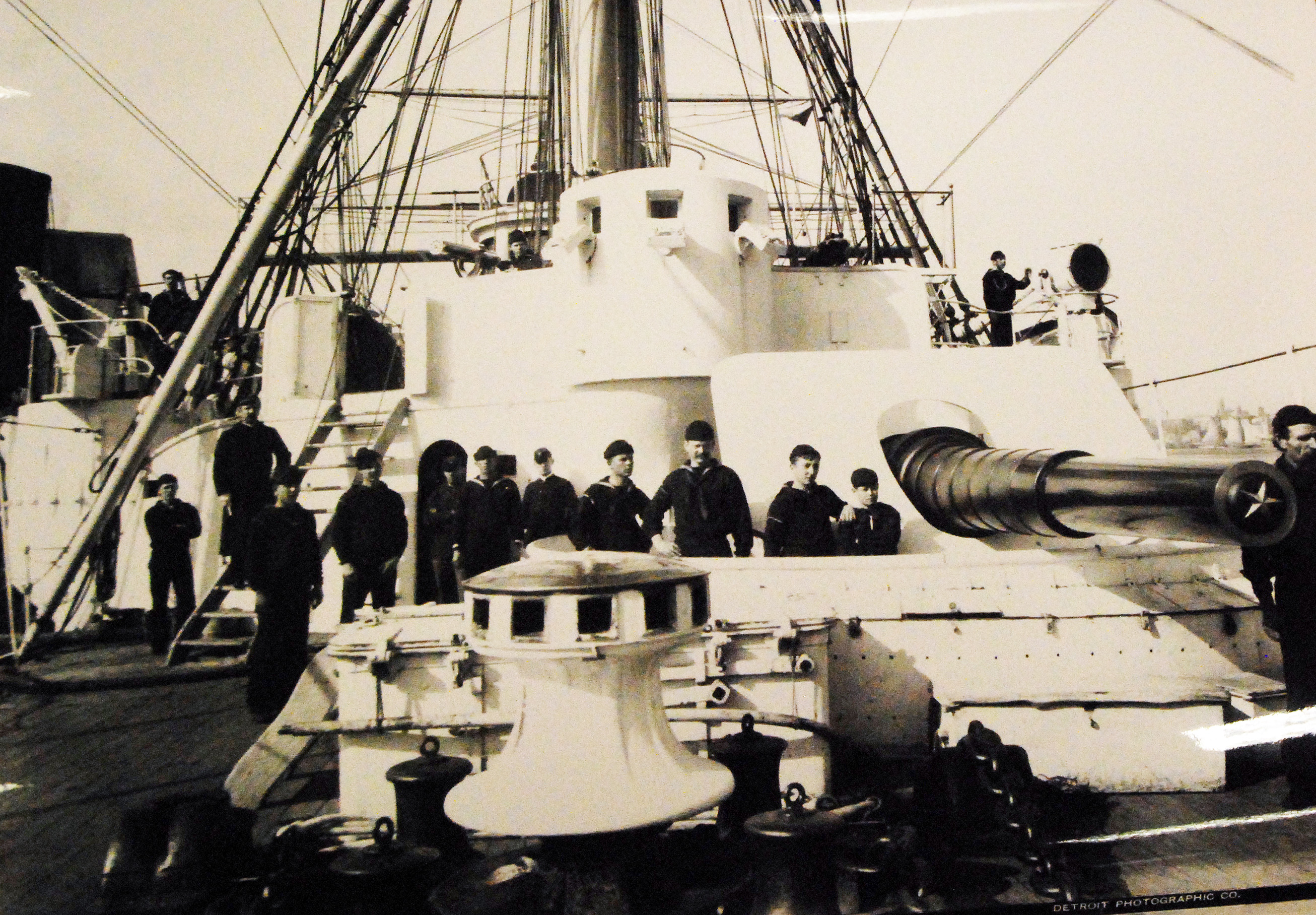
The forecastle and 8 inch gun on Atlanta

Atlanta remained at New York fitting out and undergoing modifications until July 1887, when she joined the North Atlantic Squadron. For a little over two years, she cruised the Atlantic coast, the Gulf of Mexico, and the West Indies. On 30 September 1889, she was reassigned to the Squadron of Evolution with which she voyaged to Europe and the Mediterranean that winter. On the return voyage the protected cruiser paid a friendship visit to the Republic of Brazil before returning to New York at the end of July 1890. There, she resumed duty along the east coast and in the West Indies. Between February and April 1891, she cruised the Gulf of Mexico. From May–October, the ship operated along the Atlantic coast and participated in exercises and maneuvers at Boston and New York, training members of the Naval Militia. Between October 1891 and July 1892, she served successively along the east coast, in the West Indies, and in South American waters.

On 2 September 1892, the cruiser was transferred from the Squadron of Evolution back to the North Atlantic Squadron. Between December 1892 and February 1893, she operated in the West Indies protecting American interests. From March–May, the warship participated in the Naval Review held at Hampton Roads, Virginia. In May–June, she returned to the Gulf of Mexico. On 18 July 1893, Atlanta was placed out of commission at Norfolk, Virginia. There, she remained until recommissioned on 2 April 1894. She returned to duty on the North Atlantic station for the next 17 months. During that assignment, she put a landing party ashore at Boca del Toro, Colombia, on 8 March 1895 to protect American lives and property threatened by a Liberal Party revolt and the activity of filibusters. In September 1895, she was placed out of commission at the New York Navy Yard where she was laid up for the next five years.

On 15 September 1900, she was placed back in commission at New York, Comdr. E. C. Pendleton in command. Late in October, the ship put to sea to join the South Atlantic Squadron off the coast of Brazil. She cruised those waters until November 1902 when she was transferred to the Caribbean Squadron. During the latter tour of duty, she again landed shore parties to protect American interests; first at Santo Domingo in April 1903 and then at Porto Bello, Panama, the following December. She made a voyage to the Mediterranean in 1904 and returned in October, via the western coast of Africa and Cape Town, to the South Atlantic station. She arrived back at Hampton Roads on 26 December and, in January 1905, moved to Annapolis, Maryland, where she was placed in reserve on 12 January. Atlanta remained inactive only until 8 May, at which time she was returned to full commission for service in the Coast Squadron to participate in midshipman training missions. In November 1905, the warship moved to Norfolk where she served as a barracks ship for sailors of the Torpedo Flotilla until 1909. At that time, she moved to Charleston, South Carolina, where she resumed duty as a barracks ship. On 23 March 1912, Atlanta was relieved of duty, and on 24 April her name was struck from the Navy List. The ship was sold at Charleston on 10 June to Frank Rijsdyk's Scheepsslooperij (ship scrapping yard).

== Bibliography ==
- Bauer, K. Jack; Roberts, Stephen S. (1991). Register of Ships of the U.S. Navy, 1775–1990: Major Combatants. Westport, Connecticut: Greenwood Press. ISBN 0-313-26202-0.
- Friedman, Norman (1984). U.S. Cruisers: An Illustrated Design History. Annapolis, Maryland: United States Naval Institute. ISBN 0-87021-718-6.
- Gardiner, Robert; Chesneau, Roger (1979). Conway's All the World's Fighting Ships 1860–1905. New York: Mayflower Books. ISBN 0-8317-0302-4.
- Gibbons, Tony (2007). The Encyclopedia of Ships. London: Amber Books Ltd. ISBN 978-1-905704-43-9. OCLC 516430596.
- Rentfrow, James C. Home Squadron: The U.S. Navy on the North Atlantic Station. Annapolis, Maryland: Naval Institute Press, 2014. ISBN 1-61251-447-2 OCLC 865711810
- Spears, John Randolph. A History of the United States Navy. New York: C. Scribner's Sons, 1908. OCLC 3467048
- The White Squadron. Toledo, Ohio: Woolson Spice Co., 1891. OCLC 45112425
- The White Squadron: Armed Cruisers, U.S.N. New York: International Art Publ. Co, 1800. OCLC 271460419
- The White Squadron of the U S Navy. New York: James Clarke Publisher, 1894. OCLC 50490393
