= USS Yorktown (PG-1) =

PG-1, Yorktown-class gunboat

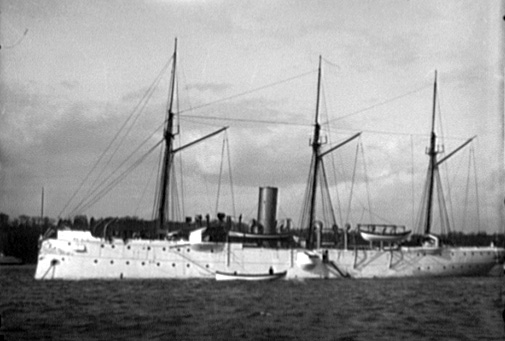
- USS Yorktown, c. 1890–1901

History

United States
- Name: Yorktown
- Namesake: Battle of Yorktown
- Awarded: 1885
- Builder: William Cramp & Sons, Philadelphia
- Laid down: 14 May 1887
- Launched: 28 April 1888
- Completed: 19 March 1889
- Commissioned: 23 April 1889
- Decommissioned: 8 December 1897
- Recommissioned: 17 November 1898
- Decommissioned: 17 June 1903
- Recommissioned: 1 October 1906
- Decommissioned: 15 July 1912
- Recommissioned: 1 April 1913
- Decommissioned: 12 June 1919
- Fate: Sold, 30 September 1921

General characteristics
- Class & type: Yorktown-class gunboat
- Displacement: 1,710 long tons (1,740 t); 1,910 long tons (1,940 t) (fully loaded)
- Length: 244 ft 5 in (74.50 m) (oa); 230 ft (70 m) (wl); 226 feet (69 m) (lpp)
- Beam: 36 ft (11 m)
- Draft: 14 ft (4.3 m)
- Propulsion: 2 × horizontally mounted triple-expansion steam engines, 3,400 ihp (2,500 kW); 2 × screw propellers; 4 × railroad boilers
- Sail plan: three-masted schooner rig with a total sail area of 6,300 sq ft (590 m^{2})
- Speed: 16 knots (30 km/h)
- Endurance: 3,443 nautical miles @ 10 knots (6,376 km @ 19 km/h)
- Complement: 191 officers and enlisted
- Armament: 6 × 6-inch (152 mm)/30 caliber Mark 3 guns; 2 × 6-pounder (57 mm (2.24 in)) guns; 2 × 3-pounder (47 mm (1.85 in)) guns; 2 × 1-pounder (37 mm (1.46 in)) guns; 2 × .30 in (7.6 mm) machine guns
- Armor: deck: 0.375 inches (9.5 mm); conning tower: 2 inches (51 mm)

USS Yorktown was lead ship of her class of steel-hulled, twin-screw gunboats in the United States Navy in the late 19th and early 20th centuries. She was the second U.S. Navy ship named in honor of the American Revolutionary War's Battle of Yorktown.

Yorktown was laid down by William Cramp & Sons of Philadelphia in May 1887 and launched in April 1888. She was just over 244 feet (74 m) long and 36 feet (11 m) abeam, and displaced 1,710 long tons (1,740 t). She was equipped with two steam engines which were supplemented with three schooner-rigged masts. The ship's main battery consisted of six 6-inch (15.2 cm) guns and was augmented by an assortment of smaller-caliber guns.

At launch, Yorktown joined the Squadron of Evolution of "New Navy" steel-hulled ships. Detached from that squadron, Yorktown, under the command of Robley D. Evans, sailed to Valparaíso, Chile, during the 1891 Baltimore Crisis and relieved USS Baltimore at that port. After that situation was resolved, Yorktown took part in the joint British–American sealing patrol in Alaskan waters and duty on the Asiatic Station before returning to the United States in 1898. Yorktown was out of commission during the Spanish–American War, but took part in actions in the Philippine–American War and the Boxer Rebellion in 1899 and 1900, respectively, after she had been recommissioned.

After three years out of commission from 1903 to 1906, Yorktown hosted the Secretary of the Navy on board when he greeted the Great White Fleet on its arrival in San Francisco in May 1908. Over the next five years, most of Yorktown's time was spent in sealing patrols in Alaska and duty in Latin American ports. From July 1912, Yorktown was out of commission for alterations, but resumed duties off the Mexican, Nicaraguan, and Honduran coasts beginning in April 1913. Through World War I, Yorktown continued in the same role, until she departed for the East Coast of the United States in April 1918. She served an escort for one convoy headed to Halifax in August, and remained in coastal escort duties in the east until January 1919. After arrival at San Diego in February, she was decommissioned for the final time in June 1919, and was assigned the hull number PG-1 the following year. She was sold in 1921 to an Oakland, California firm and broken up that same year.

== Design and construction ==
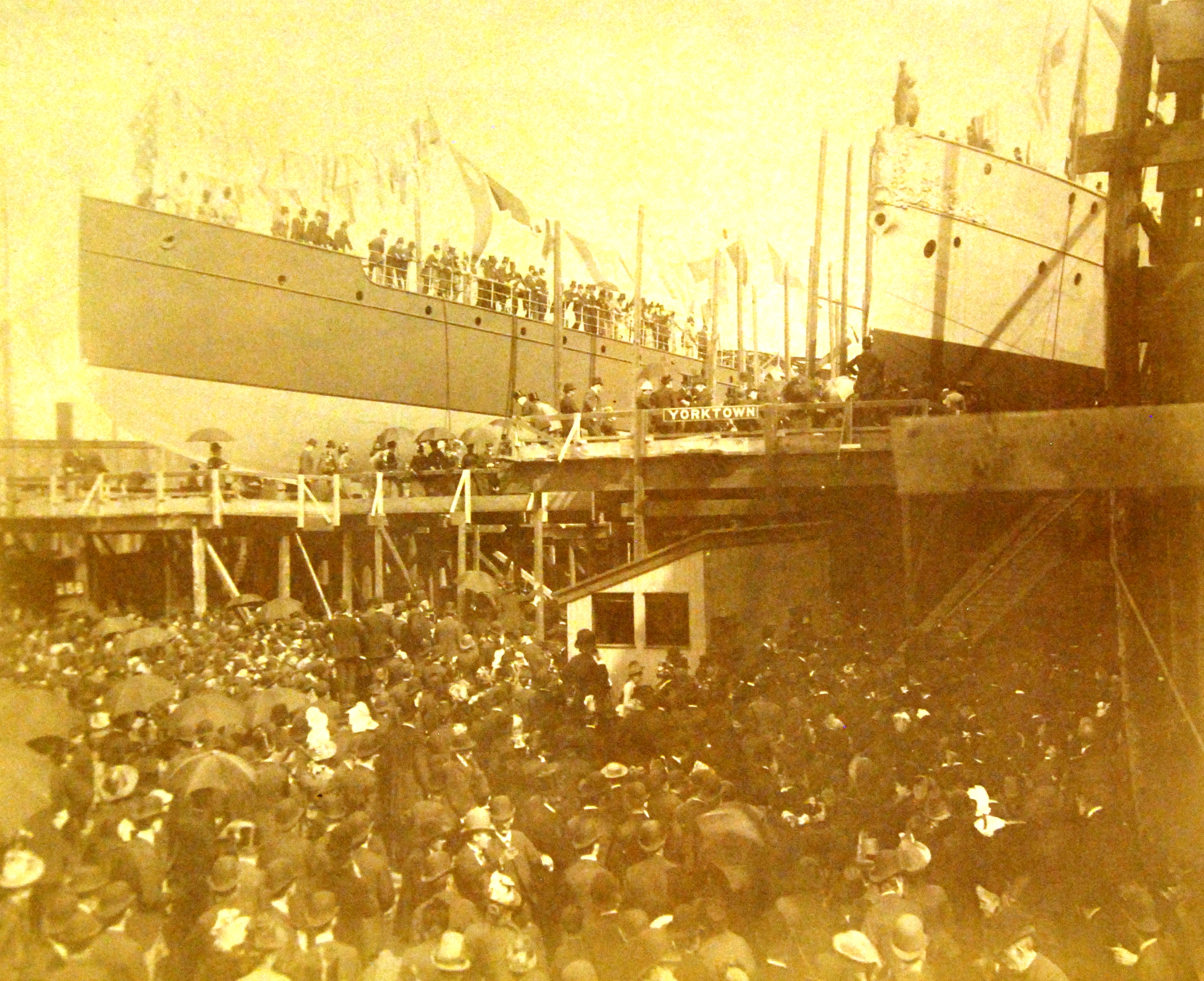
Yorktown (right) and Vesuvius being launched in Philadelphia, 28 April 1888

The Yorktown class gunboats—unofficially considered third-class cruisers—were the product of a United States Navy design attempt to produce compact ships with good seakeeping abilities and, yet, able to carry a heavy battery. Yorktown was authorized in the 1886 fiscal year, and the contract for her construction was awarded to the William Cramp & Sons shipyard of Philadelphia. The hull for Yorktown was designed by the Navy's Bureau of Construction and Repair while the mechanical design was left to the Cramp yard. Yorktown's keel was laid on 14 May 1887.

The ship was launched on 28 April 1888 and sponsored by Mary Cameron, the daughter of U.S. Senator Don Cameron of Pennsylvania. The dynamite-gun cruiser Vesuvius was launched a few minutes after Yorktown in the same ceremony. According to a news account, 25 United States Senators, 180 Congressmen, the Secretary of the Navy William Collins Whitney, and the governors of six states attended the dual ceremony, many arriving from Washington, D.C., via the Baltimore and Ohio Railroad's passenger steamer SS Columbia. By 19 March 1889, Cramp had completed Yorktown and was prepared to turn her over to the Navy.

=== Layout ===
As built, Yorktown was 244 feet 5 inches (74.50 m) in length and 36 feet (11 m) abeam. Her steel hull had an average draft of 14 feet (4 m), which was expected to give her the ability to escape from larger ships into shallow water. At the waterline was a turtleback deck of 3/8-inch (9.5 mm) steel that formed a watertight seal over the lower spaces. The deck had a crown at the level of the waterline and curved downwards to 3 feet (0.91 m) below the waterline at the sides of the ship. Below this armored deck were twelve compartments separated by watertight bulkheads; the spaces above were equipped with watertight doors intended to be closed during battle.

Above the armored deck, Yorktown had forecastle and poop decks with an open gun deck that spanned the length of the ship between them. The conning tower was located forward on the forecastle deck and was oval-shaped to deflect shot. It was outfitted with a steam-powered steering wheel, a telegraph, and speaking tubes; it was protected by 2 inches (51 mm) of steel armor plate.

=== Propulsion ===
Yorktown was powered by two triple-expansion steam engines which each drove one of the pair of 10.5-foot (3.2 m), three-bladed screw propellers. The cylinders of each engine were 22, 31, and 51 inches (56, 79, and 130 cm) in diameter and had a 30-inch (76 cm) stroke. Each engine was rated at 3,400 indicated horsepower (2,500 kW) and together were designed to move the ship at 16 knots (30 km/h), though the ship exceeded that in her trials.

The engines, situated in separate watertight compartments, were each fed by a pair of coal-fired boilers. Each boiler was horizontally mounted and was 9 feet 6 inches (2.90 m) in diameter and 17 feet 6 inches (5.33 m) in length with a total grate area of 220 square inches (1,400 cm^{2}). Yorktown's coal bunkers could carry up to 400 long tons (410 t) of the fuel, and were shielded from "shot and shell". At a near top-speed of 16 knots, the ship could cover 2,800 nautical miles (5,200 km) in 6 1/2 days; at the more economical speed of 8 knots (15 km/h) she could cruiser 12,000 nautical miles (22,000 km) over 62 days.

To supplement her steam power plant, Yorktown was built with three masts that were schooner-rigged. She had a total sail area of 6,300 square feet (590 m^{2}). The steam and sail combination was expected to allow Yorktown to remain at sea for months at a time during wartime.

=== Armament ===
Yorktown's main battery consisted of six 6-inch (152 mm)/30 caliber Mark 3 guns, (Note: The 30 denotes the length of the gun barrels; in this case, the gun is 30 calibers, meaning that the gun is 30 times long as it is in diameter.) with each gun weighing in excess of 11,000 pounds (5,000 kg). Two were mounted on the forecastle deck, two on the poop deck, and the other pair amidships on the gun deck. The two guns on the gun deck were mounted 10 feet (3.0 m) above the waterline, while the other four were 18 feet (5.5 m) above. The guns fired 105-pound (48 kg) armor-piercing projectiles with a propellant charge weighing 18.8 pounds (8.5 kg) at 1,950 feet per second (590 m/s). At an elevation of 30.2°, the guns had a range of 18,000 yards (16,000 m). Each gun was shielded with steel plating 3 inches (76 mm) thick.

Yorktown's secondary battery consisted of two 6-pounder (57 mm (2.24 in)) guns, two 3-pounder (47 mm (1.85 in)) guns, and two 1-pounder (37 mm (1.46 in)) guns. All were based on designs of the French arms company Hotchkiss. According to a 1902 Bureau of Ordnance publication, an armor-piercing round fired from a 6-pounder gun could penetrate 2 inches (51 mm) of armor at a distance of 1,000 yards (910 m).

== 1889–1897 ==
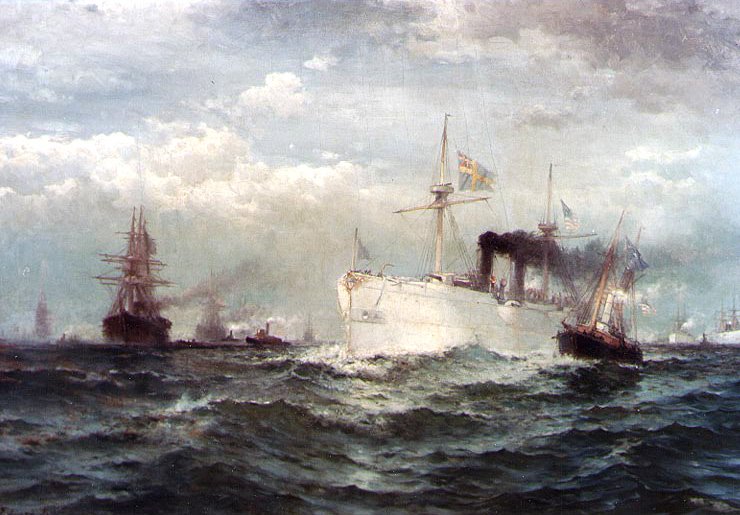
Yorktown participated in the ceremonies centered on the repatriation of the remains of John Ericsson to his native Sweden in August 1890.

The ship was commissioned at the League Island (Philadelphia) Navy Yard on 23 April 1889 under the command of Commander French E. Chadwick. After Yorktown conducted her final sea trials, she was assigned to the "Squadron of Evolution"—sometimes also referred to as the "White Squadron"— in late 1889. Yorktown operated with that unit as it developed tactical maneuvers for use by the new steel-hulled naval vessels then coming into service in the United States Navy. After this duty, Yorktown departed the east coast of the United States on 7 December 1889, bound for European waters; stopped briefly at Fayal in the Azores; and arrived at Lisbon, Portugal, two days before Christmas. The ship subsequently cruised the Mediterranean into the early spring of the following year, calling at ports in Spain, Morocco, France, Italy, Greece, and Malta. Following her return to the United States on 17 June 1890, the warship entered drydock at the New York Navy Yard on 1 July for repairs that lasted until 8 August. Upon the completion of these alterations, Yorktown took part in the ceremonies marking the embarkation of the remains of the noted inventor, John Ericsson—of Monitor fame—for transportation back to his native Sweden for burial.

Yorktown next again operated in the Squadron of Evolution off the eastern seaboard and into the Gulf of Mexico into the summer of 1891. Under Acting Rear Admiral John Grimes Walker, the squadron normally cruised in the Gulf of Mexico from January to April and off the east coast from May to October. While in the gulf, the ships called at Galveston, Texas; New Orleans; and Pensacola, Florida; and carried out target practice in Tampa Bay. Later, the squadron conducted small arms practice at Yorktown, Virginia, after arriving at Hampton Roads. In July 1891, the squadron carried out exercises and maneuvers in connection with the naval militias of New York and Massachusetts during which it added torpedo attacks upon the Fleet to the usual target practices. In addition, it conducted drills and landing exercises. The Secretary of the Navy's report for the fiscal year 1891 noted that "useful experience" had been gained by the Squadron of Evolution in the training of commanding, navigating, and watch officers in skillfully and safely maneuvering vessels in formation and in restricted waters. In addition, engineers were trained in regulating and maintaining economical coal consumption.

=== Baltimore crisis ===
On 8 October 1891, Yorktown, under the command of Commander Robley D. Evans, departed New York to join the Pacific Squadron. The gunboat put into Charlotte Amalie, Danish West Indies, to "coal ship" on 14 October. While the ship was engaged in this duty, Yorktown was ordered to Valparaíso, Chile, in response to the Baltimore Crisis.

During the 1891 Chilean Civil War, SS Itata, a cargo ship employed by Chilean Congressionalists, had loaded weaponry in California, but was detained in San Diego by U.S. officials. After Itata was able to slip away from San Diego, Charleston caught up with the ship at the Chilean port of Iquique in July 1891 and escorted the ship back to San Diego before her cargo could be unloaded. In October, some months after the Itata Incident had ended, the American cruiser Baltimore put in at Valparaíso. On 16 October, a group of sailors from Baltimore ashore on liberty were attacked by Congressionalists, still angry at the Itata affair. Two of Baltimore's sailors were killed and eighteen wounded; thirty-six other American sailors were arrested by the local authorities. Tensions ran high in both Chile and the United States.

Yorktown, a part of the United States' response, departed Charlotte Amalie for Valparaíso on 17 October for a six-week, storm-tossed voyage around the South American continent via the Straits of Magellan. Less than two weeks after Yorktown's 30 November arrival, Baltimore departed, leaving American interests in the hands of Evans and Yorktown. Over the ensuing weeks, Chile and the United States came close to war, but cooler heads prevailed. Locally, Evans' patience was "dangerously tested", but it held. One inflammatory incident occurred when Chilean torpedo boats bore down on Evans' ship, turning their helms hard over at the last possible instant to avoid a collision. On another occasion, a group of locals threw rocks at Evans and his gig as it lay at the foot of a jetty.

After a month at Valparaíso, Yorktown took on refugees from the American, Spanish, and Italian legations in mid-January 1892. She got underway on the 19th and arrived at Callao, Peru, on the 25th. While Yorktown lay anchored there, tension between the United States and Chile relaxed and the crisis abated, and the Chilean later government provided compensation for the families of the American sailors that were killed.

=== Sealing patrol ===
Yorktown stood out of Callao on 4 March 1892, steamed northward via San Diego and San Francisco, and eventually arrived at the Mare Island Navy Yard, Vallejo, California. The gunboat subsequently underwent repairs there until late in the following month. Having weathered one diplomatic storm and international incident, Evans and his command soon set sail on another mission that, if handled wrongly, could have caused ill-feeling with the British.

That spring, Yorktown—along with two other naval vessels and a trio of revenue cutters—headed toward Arctic waters on 27 April to protect the great herds of seals in the Bering Sea from poachers. Traveling along the west coast of the United States, the gunboat and her crew "braced", in Evans' words, "at the prospect of doing something". As at Valparaíso, Evans faced the possibility of becoming involved in an international incident arising from possible confrontations with Canadian sealers. Operating under the protection of the British crown, the latter had taken particularly heavy catches. Many American vessels put to sea under the British flag in an attempt to evade prosecution by their own government. The British agreed to help put an end to the slaughter of seals and decided upon joint action with the United States in prosecuting the poachers. About 110 schooners, large and small, made up the sealing fleet, typically "armed" with double-barrelled shotguns for killing the animals and Winchester rifles for dealing with any humans who attempted to interfere. The fact that the great majority of seals killed had been female —still with young in many cases—almost doubled the toll of slain seals. As Evans noted: "the slaughter in the North Pacific was fearful".

Arriving at Port Townsend, Washington, on 30 April, Yorktown put to sea on 13 May, arriving at Iliuliuk, Unalaska, one week later. Coaling there, the gunboat skirted the ice floes near the seal rookeries of the Pribilof Islands, reconnoitering the vicinity for sealers. Assisted by a revenue cutter, Yorktown guarded the passes to the Bering Sea. The crews of the patrolling American ships lacked fresh provisions but carried on in spite of the hardships imposed by both diet and climate. Fresh fish, however, proved abundant. Codfish was the staple with an occasional gourmet treat of salmon.

=== Telescopic gunsight ===
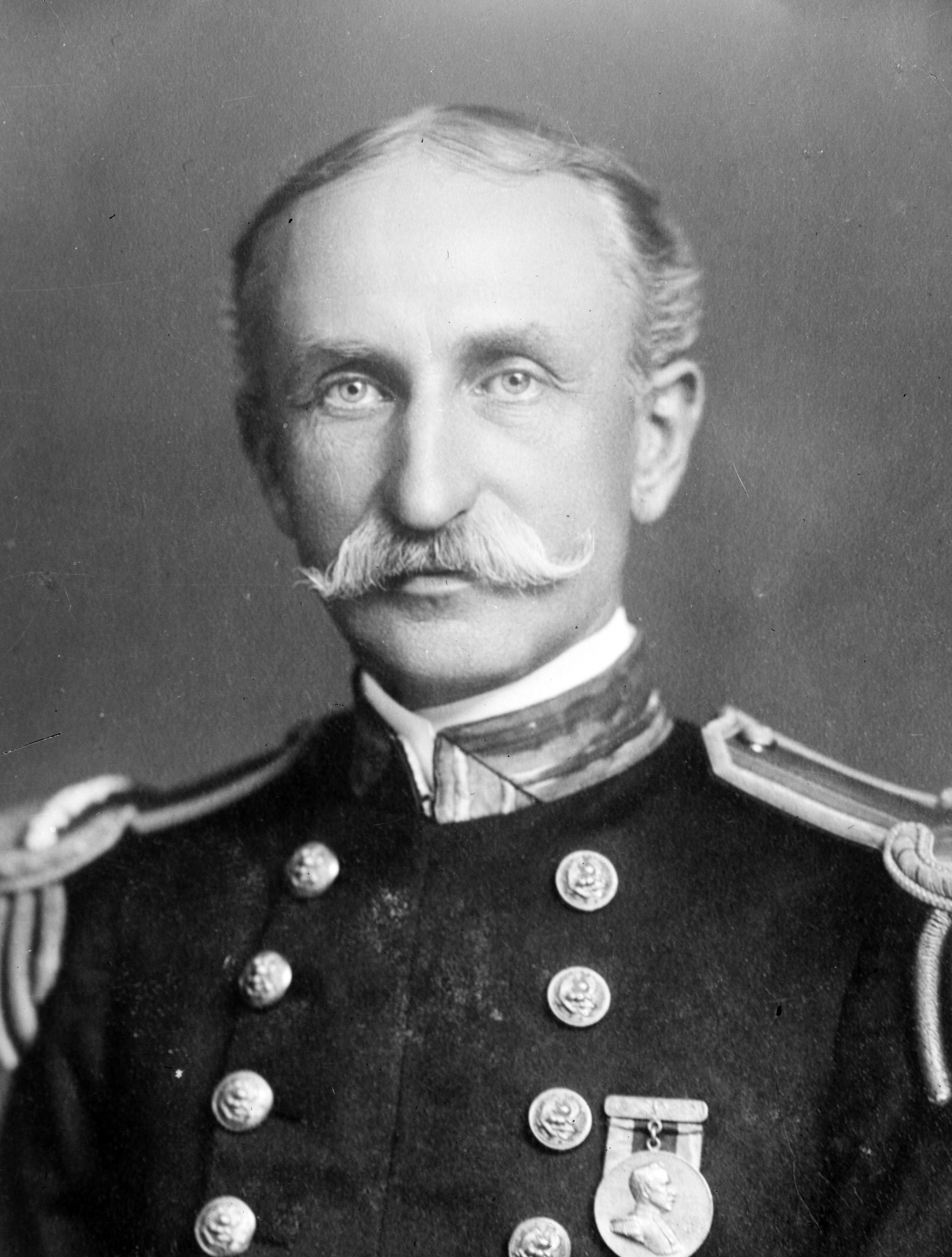
As a lieutenant, Bradley Fiske tested a successful telescopic gun sight on Yorktown in 1892.

Besides the patrols made during this deployment in northwestern waters, Yorktown conducted routine operations such as target practices. Among the officers assigned to the ship at that time was Lt. Bradley Fiske, a young officer who had invented and constructed a practical telescopic gunsight. Fiske's sight had been tested in Baltimore and had favorably impressed that ship's officers—including her commander, Captain Winfeld S. Schley. Evans, however, had not taken a liking to Fiske's newfangled gadget but nevertheless consented to allow a second test on board Yorktown (the first one had failed miserably). On the afternoon of 22 September 1892, during scheduled target practice, Fiske's invention worked as designed and elicited praise from Evans. As Fiske himself later wrote in the United States Naval Institute's magazine Proceedings, modern naval gunnery had its birth not in the British Navy but in the American—off Unalaska on 22 September 1892, in Yorktown.

Yorktown continued her task of patrolling until 21 September when she departed Unalaska for the Mare Island Navy Yard. From 11 to 24 October, the ship underwent repairs there before proceeding on to the east coast via Cape Horn. Yorktown eventually arrived at Norfolk, Virginia, on 24 February 1893.

After repairs at the New York Navy Yard from 25 April to 26 July, Yorktown retraced her route south and sailed again around Cape Horn back into the Pacific. She then moved north to resume patrolling the Bering Sea. She protected seal rookeries into 1894 before returning to Mare Island for repairs which lasted into mid-September.

On 24 September 1894, Yorktown sailed for the western Pacific and duty on the Asiatic Station. Sailing via Honolulu, she reached Yokohama, Japan, on 8 December 1894 and spent the next three years, under the command of Commander Charles Stockton touching at the principal ports-of-call along the coasts of China and Japan. She departed Yokohama early in the autumn of 1897 and made port at Mare Island on 18 November 1897. Subsequently, laid up at Mare Island and decommissioned on 8 December, the gunboat remained inactive there through the Spanish–American War in 1898.

== 1898–1903 ==
Recommissioned on 17 November 1898, with Commander Charles S. Sperry in command, Yorktown sailed again for the Far East on 7 January 1899. Rumors of German machinations in Samoa lengthened Yorktown's stay at Hawaii from a few days to a few weeks; but, when the anticipated trouble failed to materialize, Yorktown resumed her voyage to the Philippine Islands. On 23 February, she arrived at Cavite Navy Yard, near Manila where patrolled to prevent gun-runners thought to be supplying guns and ammunition to the Insurrectos, Filipinos fighting for independence.

At one point, rumors flew concerning possible German gun-running activities; and Yorktown patrolled off the entrance to Subic Bay and from thence to Lingayen to keep a lookout for the filibusters. She continued coastal patrol work over the next three years, cooperating with the Army, transporting and convoying troops, and patrolling wide areas of often badly charted waters. Upon occasion, Yorktown served as "mother ship" to smaller gunboats, providing officers and men to staff the smaller patrol craft. Ensigns William Harrison Standley and Harry E. Yarnell (both future admirals) and future naval historian and archivist Dudley Wright Knox were among the junior officers who served in Yorktown during this time.

During the Philippine–American War, Yorktown stood in to Baler Bay, on the west coast of Luzon, on 11 April 1899, on a mission to relieve a Spanish garrison that had been under siege by Filipino troops for nine months. Lt. James C. Gillmore and a party of sailors in the ship's whaleboat provided a decoy, ostensibly taking soundings of a nearby river. Meanwhile, Standley and an enlisted man landed farther up the coast to reconnoiter. The next day, Gillmore and his boat crew drifted into a trap, running aground too far from the river's mouth and out of sight of Yorktown. Filipino troops, hidden in the jungle-covered banks, raked the boat with rifle fire. Two American sailors were killed; two were mortally wounded; and the remainder, including Gillmore, were slightly wounded. The survivors were taken prisoner until freed by U.S. Army troops. Standley completed his mission and, together with the enlisted signalman, made it back to the ship.

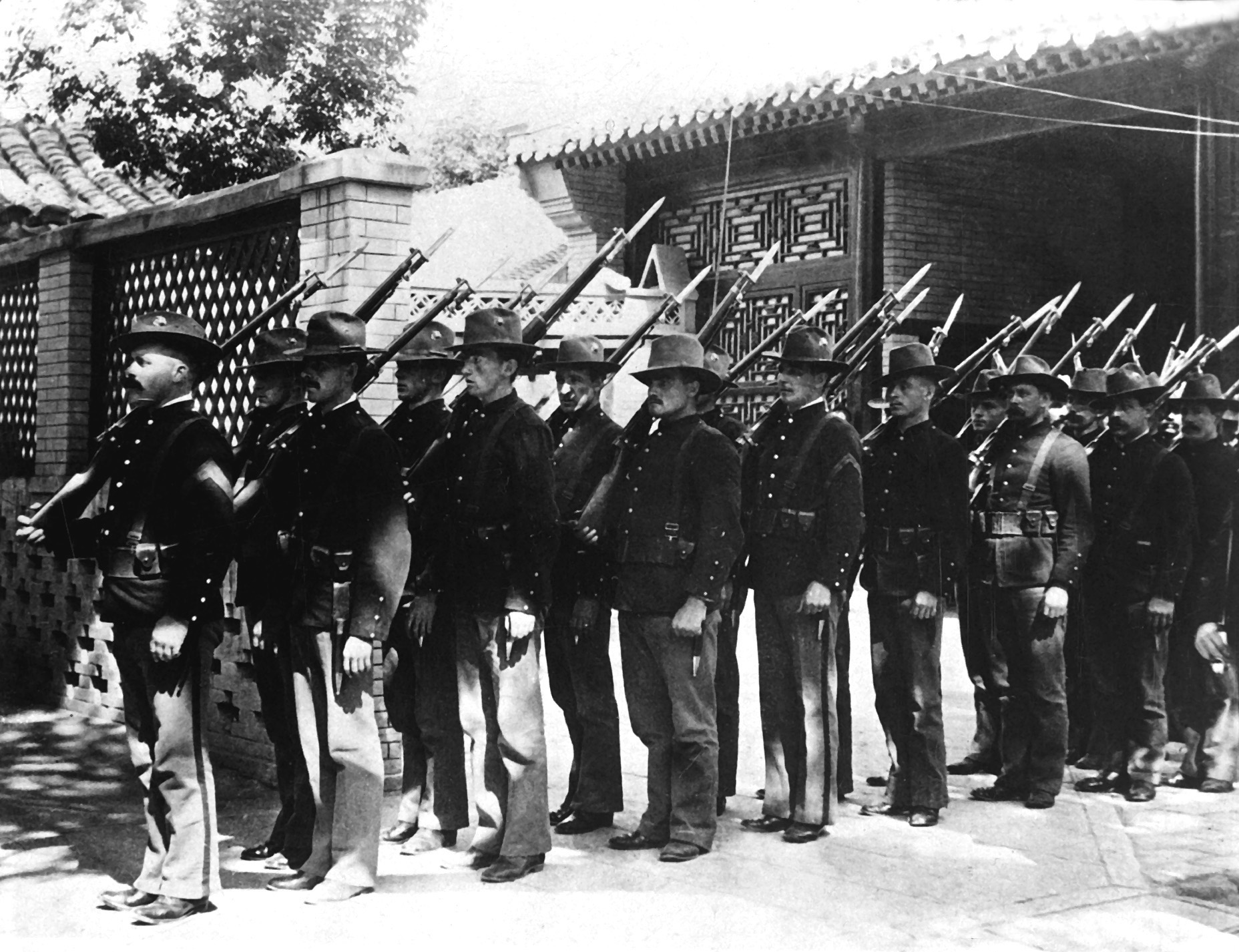
U.S. Marines in China during the Boxer Rebellion; Marines from Yorktown participated in operations at Tianjin, June–July 1900.

In 1899, the situation in China worsened until it culminated in the Boxer Rebellion. The following spring, Yorktown was withdrawn from her patrol duties in the northern Philippines to provide assistance to the operations off the coast of North China. She departed Manila on 3 April 1900, bound for China; and, after she reached the mainland, her landing force served ashore at Taku. In addition, Marines from Yorktown participated in the actions at Tianjin between June and July. Under the command of Commander Edward D. Taussig from June 1900 to June 1901, she continued to support the China Relief Expedition forces. In June 1900, she assisted Oregon back off a reef near that Chinese port.

The gunboat departed Shanghai on 10 September 1900 and reached Cavite on the 17th. In the Philippines, she resumed her cooperation with Army forces, still engaged in pacification operations, and continued these duties for the next two years. In between pacification missions, she performed survey work: at Guam in November 1901 and at Dumanquillas Bay, Philippines, in February 1903. In April 1902, Yorktown's Coxswain Joseph Quick rescued a shipmate from drowning while the ship was in port at Yokohama, Japan. For his efforts, Quick was awarded a peacetime Medal of Honor. Yorktown departed the Far East in early 1903 and returned to Mare Island on 3 June. Two weeks later, on the 17th, she was decommissioned.

== 1906–1912 ==
Recommissioned at Mare Island on 1 October 1906, with Commander Richard T. Mulligan in command, Yorktown was fitted out there until 9 November. Underway on that day, she operated off the west coasts of Mexico, Honduras, and Nicaragua into the following summer. After repairs at San Francisco and Mare Island, Yorktown conducted target practice at Magdalena Bay, Mexico, and relieved Albany as station ship at Acapulco. She then cruised with the 2d Squadron of the Pacific Fleet to Magdalena Bay and San Francisco. Over the ensuing months, Yorktown continued her regular local operations.

Yorktown hosted the Secretary of the Navy, Victor H. Metcalf, to witness the arrival of the Great White Fleet—commanded by Yorktown's former commander, Robley "Fightin' Bob" Evans—into San Francisco. The fleet arrived on 6 May 1908, and the flagship Connecticut saluted the secretary's flag on Yorktown with the discharge of seventeen guns. Metcalf also boarded Yorktown on the 8th to review the assembled battleships, armored cruisers, and torpedo boats of the Pacific and Great White Fleets. On 30 May 1908, Yorktown participated in festivities for the Rose Festival at Portland, Oregon. From June to September, Yorktown conducted seal patrols in Alaskan waters, out of Nome, Unalaska, and Sitka and, between 15 and 19 September, established a site for a wireless station at Valdez. Afterwards, Yorktown sailed south to rejoin the Pacific Fleet, conducting battle practices between 19 November and 1 December at Magdalena Bay. She later joined the armored cruisers West Virginia and Colorado and the tender Glacier at Acajutla, El Salvador, before sailing for Corinto, Nicaragua, in March 1909. After more target practices at Magdalena Bay, Yorktown was repaired at Mare Island in June and into July before shifting to Seattle, to participate in festivities for the Alaska-Yukon-Pacific Exposition. Later in July, the ship visited Esquimalt, British Columbia. She subsequently cruised off the Pacific coast and participated in the Portolá Festival at San Francisco in October.

From 13 December 1909 to 27 March 1910, Yorktown operated off Corinto, Nicaragua, with the Nicaraguan Expeditionary Squadron. She then pursued a schedule of exercises and maneuvers, operating between California and British Columbia through June and July. She returned to a posture of readiness off Corinto and San Juan del Sur between 13 August and 7 September. She then operated off Ecuadorian, Colombian, and Peruvian ports, with the United States Consul General at Large embarked, between 19 September and 16 October before putting into Panama for coal and stores. She subsequently patrolled at Amapala, Honduras, and the familiar Corinto for most of November and December. She spent Christmas at Corinto before shifting to Amapala, en route to San Francisco and Mare Island. From March to July 1911, Yorktown cruised off the west coasts of Mexico, Nicaragua, and Honduras. On 29 May, she rescued the survivors from the foundered Panamanian steamer Taboga, which had sunk with the loss of 60 of its 100 passengers and crew. Another period of repairs and upkeep in the late summer of 1911 proceeded the ship's duties off the Pacific coasts of South and Central America. She returned to Mare Island in May 1912, and was decommissioned there for alterations on 15 July.

== 1913–1919 ==
Recommissioned on 1 April 1913, with Commander George B. Bradshaw in command, Yorktown operated out of San Diego on shakedown into mid-April. She was soon back at Corinto, however, remaining in Nicaragua until 5 June. After a brief period of operations off the coast, she returned to Corinto on 21 June and remained there for over a month before departing on 31 July to coal at Salina Cruz, Mexico. She moved to Mazatlán on 10 August and there picked up mail, delivering it to the port of Topolobampo, Mexico, on the 11th. Yorktown remained there until mid-September.

For the remainder of 1913, Yorktown conducted local operations out of San Diego and San Francisco. In January 1914, though, the gunboat returned to Mexican waters and investigated local conditions at Ensenada between 3 and 6 January before moving, in subsequent months, to a succession of Mexican ports: Mazatlán, San Blas, Miramar, Topolobampo, and La Paz. Following an overhaul at Mare Island from 24 June to 2 September 1914, Yorktown served in Mexican waters again into June 1915. From that point until the entry of the United States into World War I in April 1917, Yorktown continued her routine of patrols off Mexican, Nicaraguan, and Honduran ports with occasional repairs at Mare Island and maneuvers out of San Diego.

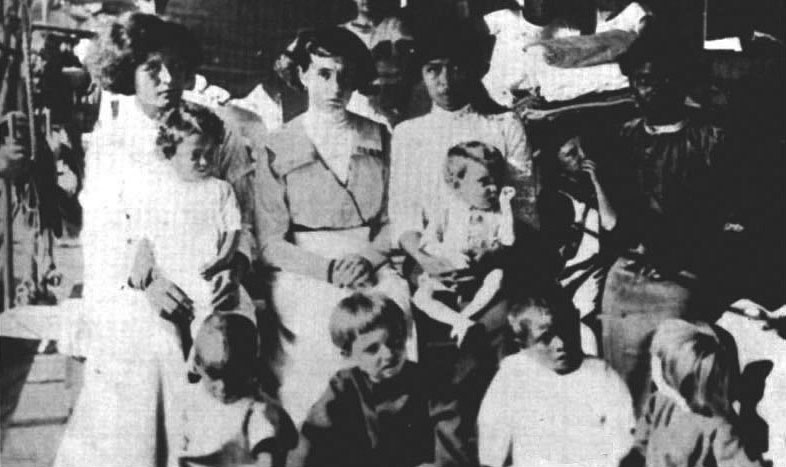
Yorktown rescued the last surviving members of the guano mining settlement on Clipperton Island in July 1917.

After the United States joined the Allies, Yorktown operated off the coast of Mexico until August 1917, when she paused briefly at San Diego. On 18 July 1917, Yorktown rescued the last surviving members of an abandoned guano mining settlement on Clipperton Island. From a peak population of roughly 100 in 1915, only four women and seven children survived. After her time off the Mexican coast, Yorktown then cruised off the west coasts of Central and South America into 1918. After a refit at Mare Island, Yorktown, sailed for the east coast on 28 April 1918, transiting the Panama Canal en route, and arrived at New York on 20 August. The gunboat escorted a coastal convoy to Halifax, soon thereafter before returning to New York. She performed local coastwise escort duties through the end of World War I. After a period of upkeep at the New York Navy Yard in December, she departed the east coast on 2 January 1919 on her last voyage to California.

Arriving at San Diego on 15 February 1919, Yorktown was placed out of commission at Mare Island on 12 June 1919. On 17 June 1920, she was assigned the hull number PG-1. The veteran steel-hulled gunboat was sold to the Union Hide Company of Oakland, California, on 30 September 1921; she was broken up in Oakland sometime after that.

== Bibliography ==
- Bauer, K. Jack; Roberts, Stephen S. (1991). Register of Ships of the U.S. Navy, 1775–1990: Major Combatants. New York: Greenwood Press. ISBN 978-0-313-26202-9. OCLC 24010356.
- Hardy, Osgood (May 1922). "The Itata Incident". The Hispanic American Historical Review. 5 (2). Baltimore: Board of Editors of the Hispanic American Historical Review: 195–226. doi:10.1215/00182168-5.2.195. ISSN 0018-2168. OCLC 3518594.
- Silverstone, Paul H. (2006). The New Navy, 1883–1922. New York: Routledge. ISBN 978-0-415-97871-2. OCLC 63171106.
- Wimmel, Kenneth (1998). Theodore Roosevelt and the Great White Fleet: American Seapower Comes of Age (1st ed.). Washington: Brassey's. ISBN 978-1-57488-153-0. OCLC 37688348.
