= USS Yorktown =

USS Yorktown may refer to the following ships of the United States Navy:

- USS Yorktown (1839), a 16-gun sloop-of-war commissioned in 1840, sunk in 1850
- USS Yorktown (PG-1), the lead Yorktown-class gunboat commissioned in 1889, sold in 1921
- USS Yorktown (CV-5), the lead Yorktown-class aircraft carrier commissioned in 1937, sunk in 1942
- USS Yorktown (CV-10), an Essex-class aircraft carrier commissioned in 1943, a museum ship since 1975
- USS Yorktown (CG-48), a Ticonderoga-class cruiser commissioned in 1984, scrapping completed in 2024
