= Joseph Quick =

Joseph Quick may refer to:

- Joseph Quick (engineer) (1809–1894), English waterworks engineer
- Joseph Quick (Medal of Honor) (1877–1969), American seaman
