= Yorktown class =

The Yorktown class may refer to:

- Yorktown-class gunboat, a class of three steel-hulled gunboats of the United States Navy in the late 19th and early 20th centuries
- Yorktown-class aircraft carrier, a class of three aircraft carriers active before and during World War II
