= Yorktown-class gunboat =

Class of American gunboats

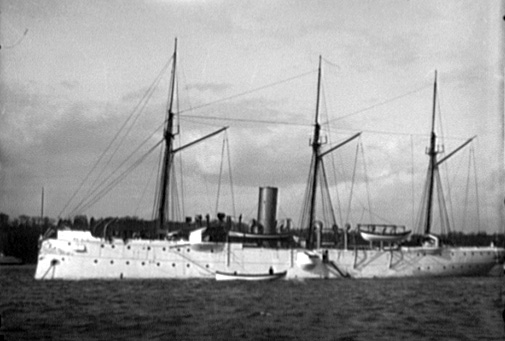
- USS Yorktown, the lead ship of the Yorktown class

Class overview
- Builders: William Cramp & Sons (1); N. F. Palmer & Co. (2)
- Operators: United States Navy
- Succeeded by: Petrel class
- Built: 1887–1888
- In service: 1889–1929
- In commission: 1889–1919
- Completed: 3
- Lost: 1
- Scrapped: 2

General characteristics
- Class & type: steel-hulled gunboat
- Displacement: 1,710 long tons (1,740 t); 1,910 long tons (1,940 t) (fully loaded)
- Length: 244 ft 5 in (74.50 m) (oa); 230 ft (70 m) (wl); 226 feet (69 m) (lpp)
- Beam: 36 ft (11 m)
- Draft: 14 ft (4.3 m)
- Propulsion: 2 × horizontally mounted triple-expansion steam engines, 3,400 ihp (2,500 kW); 2 × screw propellers; 4 × railroad boilers
- Sail plan: three-masted schooner rig with a total sail area of 6,300 sq ft (590 m^{2})
- Speed: 16 knots (30 km/h)
- Endurance: 3,443 nmi (6,376 km) at 10 knots (19 km/h)
- Complement: 191 officers and enlisted
- Armament: 6 × 6-inch (152 mm)/30 caliber Mark 3 guns; 2 × 6-pounder (57 mm (2.24 in)) guns (4 on Bennington); 2 × 3-pounder (47 mm (1.85 in)) guns (none on Bennington); 2 × 1-pounder (37 mm (1.46 in)) guns (4 on Bennington); 2 × machine or Gatling guns
- Armor: deck: 0.375 inches (9.5 mm); conning tower: 2 inches (51 mm)

The Yorktown class was a class of three steel-hulled, twin-screw gunboats built for the United States Navy beginning in 1887. All three ships of the class were named after cities near American Revolutionary War battles.

The ships were just over 244 feet (74 m) long and 36 feet (11 m) abeam and displaced a little more than 1,700 long tons (1,730 t). They were equipped with two steam engines which were supplemented with three schooner-rigged masts. The main battery of each ship consisted of six 6-inch (152.4 mm) guns and was augmented by an assortment of smaller caliber guns.

Ships of the class were in commission between 1889 and 1919. For most of their service, the ships were in the Pacific, patrolling the coasts of North and South America, Hawaii, and the western Pacific. Yorktown-class ships saw service in many of the conflicts involving the United States from the 1890s through World War I, with all three ships seeing action during the Philippine–American War. Yorktown was involved in the 1891 Baltimore Crisis in Chile, participated in the China Relief Expedition carried out in the wake of the Boxer Rebellion, and served as a convoy escort in World War I. Concord was a part of Admiral George Dewey's fleet at the Battle of Manila Bay during the Spanish–American War.

Yorktown had the longest career in commission, being decommissioned for the final time in 1919; Concord left active service ten years before that, and Bennington was taken out of service after a boiler explosion in July 1905 at San Diego, California.

== Design and construction ==
The Yorktown-class gunboats – unofficially considered third-class cruisers – were the product of a United States Navy design attempt to produce compact ships with good seakeeping abilities and, yet, able to carry a heavy battery. Contemporary news reports indicate the class was loosely based on HMS Archer, the first ship of the Royal Navy's Archer-class torpedo cruisers. Yorktown was authorized in the 1886 fiscal year and Concord and Bennington were authorized in the 1888 fiscal year. The construction contract for Yorktown was awarded to the William Cramp & Sons shipyard of Philadelphia and her keel was laid down in May 1887. The contract for the other pair was awarded to N. F. Palmer & Co., who sublet the construction of the hulls to the Delaware River Iron Shipbuilding & Engine Works, also of Philadelphia. Concord and Bennington were laid down in May and June 1888, respectively. The hulls of the Yorktown class were designed by the Navy's Bureau of Construction and Repair while the mechanical layout was designed by the Cramp yard for Yorktown and replicated in her sister ships.

=== Layout ===
The Yorktown-class ships were 244 feet 5 inches (74.50 m) in length and 36 feet (11 m) abeam. The steel hulls had an average draft of 14 feet (4 m), which was expected to give them the ability to escape from larger ships into shallow water. At the waterline was a turtleback deck of 3/8-inch (9.5 mm) steel that formed a watertight seal over the lower spaces. This deck had a crown at the level of the waterline and curved downwards to 3 feet (0.91 m) below the waterline at the sides of the ship. Below this armored deck were twelve compartments separated by watertight bulkheads; the spaces above were equipped with watertight doors intended to be closed during battle.

Above the armored deck, each ship had forecastle and poop decks with an open gun deck that spanned the length of the ship between them. The conning tower was located forward on the forecastle deck and was oval-shaped to deflect shot. It was outfitted with a steam-powered steering wheel, a telegraph, and speaking tubes; it was protected by 2 inches (51 mm) of steel armor plate.

=== Propulsion ===
The Yorktown-class ships were powered by two triple-expansion steam engines which each drove one of the pair of 10.5-foot (3.2 m), three-bladed screw propellers. The cylinders of each engine were 22, 31, and 51 inches (56, 79, and 130 cm) in diameter and had a 30-inch (76 cm) stroke. Each engine was rated at 3,400 indicated horsepower (2,500 kW) and as a pair were designed to move the ships at 16 knots (30 km/h), though all three exceeded that speed in trials; Bennington reached a top speed of 17.5 knots (32.4 km/h).

The engines, situated in separate watertight compartments, were each fed by a pair of coal-fired boilers. Each boiler was horizontally mounted and was 9 feet 6 inches (2.90 m) in diameter and 17 feet 6 inches (5.33 m) in length with a total grate area of 220 square inches (1,400 cm^{2}). The coal bunkers of each ship could carry up to 400 long tons (410 t) of the fuel, and were shielded from "shot and shell". At a near top-speed of 16 knots, the ships could cover 2,800 nautical miles (5,200 km) in 6½ days; at the more economical speed of 8 knots (15 km/h) they could cruise 12,000 nautical miles (22,000 km) over 62 days.

To supplement the steam power plant, the ships were built with three masts that were schooner-rigged. They had a total sail area of 6,300 square feet (590 m^{2}). The steam and sail combination was expected to allow the Yorktown-class ships to remain at sea for months at a time during wartime.

=== Armament ===
The main battery of the Yorktown class consisted of six 6-inch (152 mm)/30 caliber Mark 3 guns, (Note: The 30 denotes the length of the gun barrels; in this case, the gun is 30 calibers, meaning that the gun is 30 times long as its bore.) with each gun weighing in excess of 11,000 pounds (5,000 kg). Two were mounted on the forecastle deck, two on the poop deck, and the other pair amidships on the gun deck. The two guns on the gun deck were mounted 10 feet (3.0 m) above the waterline, while the other four were 18 feet (5.5 m) above. The guns fired 105-pound (48 kg) armor-piercing projectiles with a propellant charge weighing 18.8 pounds (8.5 kg) at 1,950 feet per second (590 m/s). At an elevation of 30.2°, the guns had a range of 18,000 yards (16,000 m). Each gun was shielded with steel plating 3 inches (76 mm) thick.

The secondary battery for Yorktown and Concord consisted of two 6-pounder (57 mm (2.24 in)) guns, two 3-pounder (47 mm, 1.85 in) guns, and two 1-pounder (37 mm, 1.46 in) guns; Bennington was armed with four 6-pounders and four 1-pounders. All were based on designs of the French arms company Hotchkiss. According to a 1902 Bureau of Ordnance publication, an armor-piercing round fired from a 6-pounder gun could penetrate 2 inches (51 mm) of armor at a distance of 1,000 yards (910 m).

== Ships in class ==
Of the three class members, Yorktown had the longest U.S. Navy career, spanning from her 1889 commissioning to her final decommissioning in 1919. Concord remained afloat the longest: she was decommissioned in 1910, but served as a training ship for the Washington Naval Militia until 1914, and as a quarantine ship for the Public Health Service in Astoria, Oregon, until 1929. Bennington had the shortest Navy career: she suffered a boiler explosion in July 1905 at San Diego, California, that killed over 60 crewmen. Her hulk was used as a water barge at Honolulu for the Matson Line from 1912 to 1924, when she was scuttled off Oahu.

=== Yorktown ===
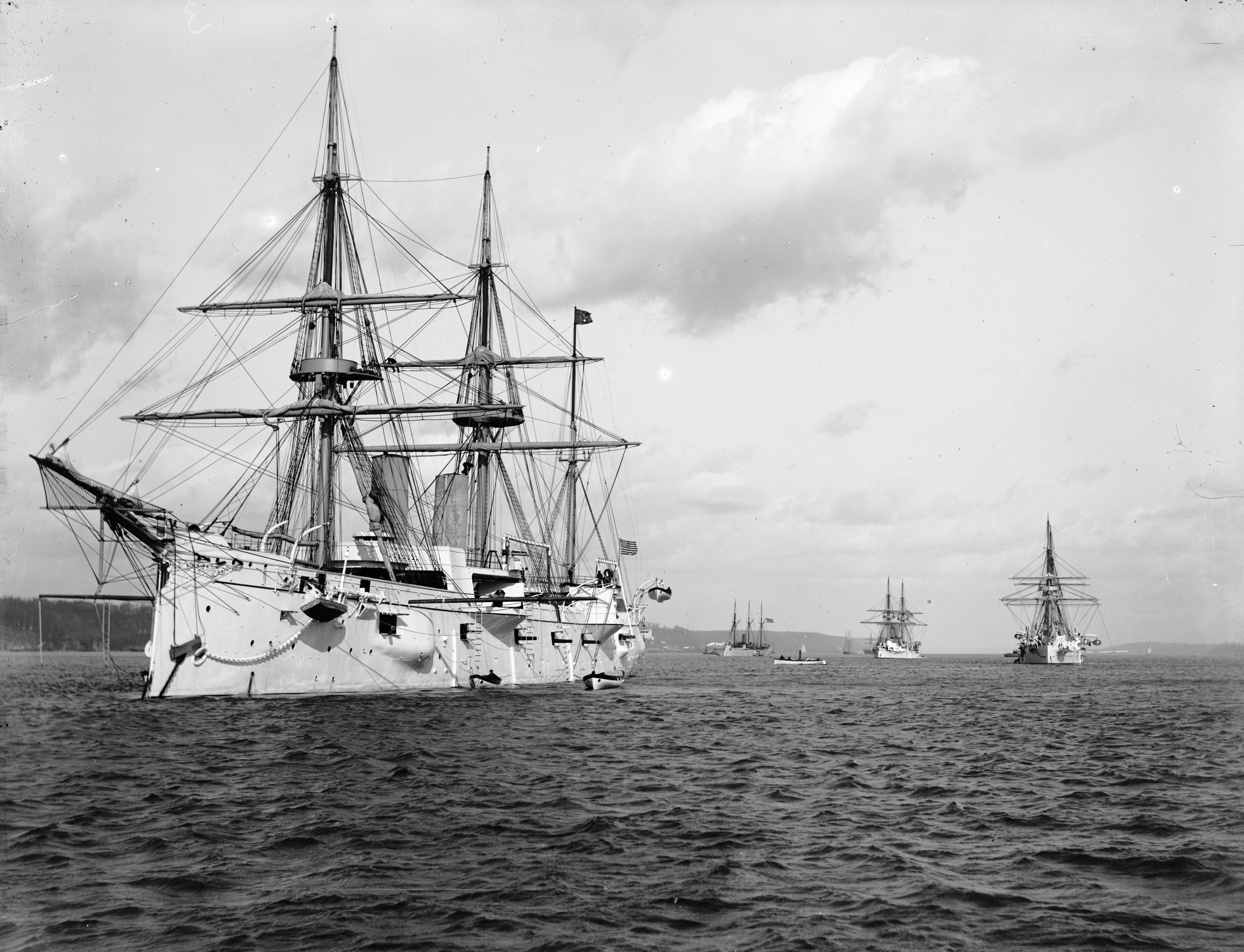
After her commissioning, Yorktown (second from left) was a member of the United States Navy's Squadron of Evolution.

Yorktown was laid down by William Cramp & Sons of Philadelphia in May 1887 and launched in April 1888. After her April 1889 commissioning, Yorktown joined the Squadron of Evolution of "New Navy" steel-hulled ships. Detached from that squadron, Yorktown, under the command of Robley D. Evans, sailed to Valparaíso, Chile, during the 1891 Baltimore Crisis and relieved Baltimore at that port. After that situation was resolved, Yorktown took part in the joint British–American sealing patrol in Alaskan waters and served as a station ship before returning to the United States in 1898. Yorktown was out of commission during the Spanish–American War, but took part in actions in the Philippine–American War and the Boxer Rebellion in 1899 and 1900, respectively, after she had been recommissioned.

After three years out of commission from 1903 to 1906, Yorktown hosted Secretary of the Navy Victor H. Metcalf on board when he greeted the Great White Fleet on its arrival in San Francisco in May 1907. Over the next five years, most of Yorktown's time was spent in sealing patrols in Alaska and duty in Latin American ports. From July 1912, Yorktown was out of commission for alterations, but resumed duties off the Mexican, Nicaraguan, and Honduran coasts beginning in April 1913. Through World War I, Yorktown continued in the same role, until she departed for the East Coast of the United States in April 1918. She served an escort for one convoy headed to Halifax, Nova Scotia, Canada, in August, and remained in coastal escort duties in the east until January 1919. After arrival at San Diego in February, she was decommissioned for the final time in June 1919; she was sold in 1921 to an Oakland firm and broken up that same year.

=== Concord ===
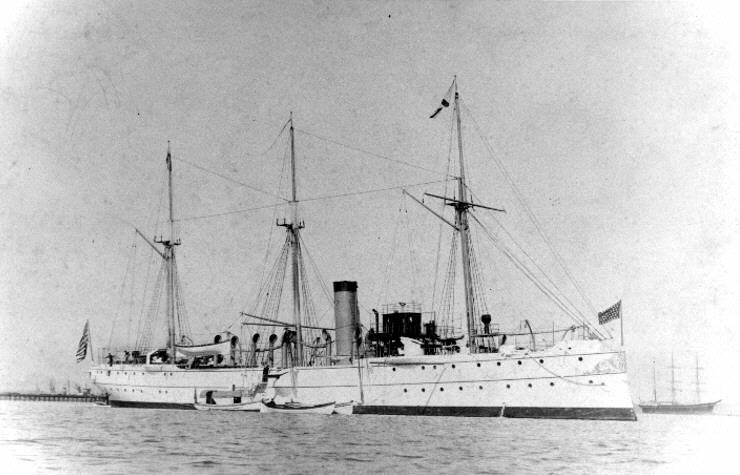
Concord in San Francisco Bay, c. 1890s

The contract to build Concord was awarded to N. F. Palmer & Co. of Chester, Pennsylvania, in the 1888 fiscal year. Her hull was subcontracted to the Delaware River Iron Shipbuilding & Engine Works, which laid down her keel in March 1888. Concord was launched in March 1890. After her 1891 commissioning, Concord spent the next few years sailing along the East Coast of the United States, in the West Indies, and in the Gulf of Mexico. In 1893, Concord cruised on the Asiatic Station and also sailed on the sealing patrol, keeping check on fur seal hunters in Alaska. After another stint in the Far East in 1894, Concord spent a year out of commission at San Francisco from May 1896 to May 1897. After spending most of the rest of 1897 in Alaskan waters, Concord returned to the Asiatic Station in January 1898. She joined Admiral George Dewey's fleet for the 1 May 1898 Battle of Manila Bay, a decisive American victory over the Spanish Fleet in the Spanish–American War. After the battle, Concord supported United States Army operations in the Philippines in the Philippine–American War.

From 1901 to 1909, Concord alternated between Alaskan patrols, cruising the Mexican coast, and periodic trips to China, serving for a time on the Yangtze Patrol. In November 1909, Concord was decommissioned at the Puget Sound Navy Yard. For the next five years, she served as a barracks ship for the Washington Naval Militia. In 1914, the former Concord was transferred to the Public Health Service and served as a quarantine ship at Astoria, Oregon until 1929. After a brief return to Navy custody, the ship was sold in June 1929.

=== Bennington ===
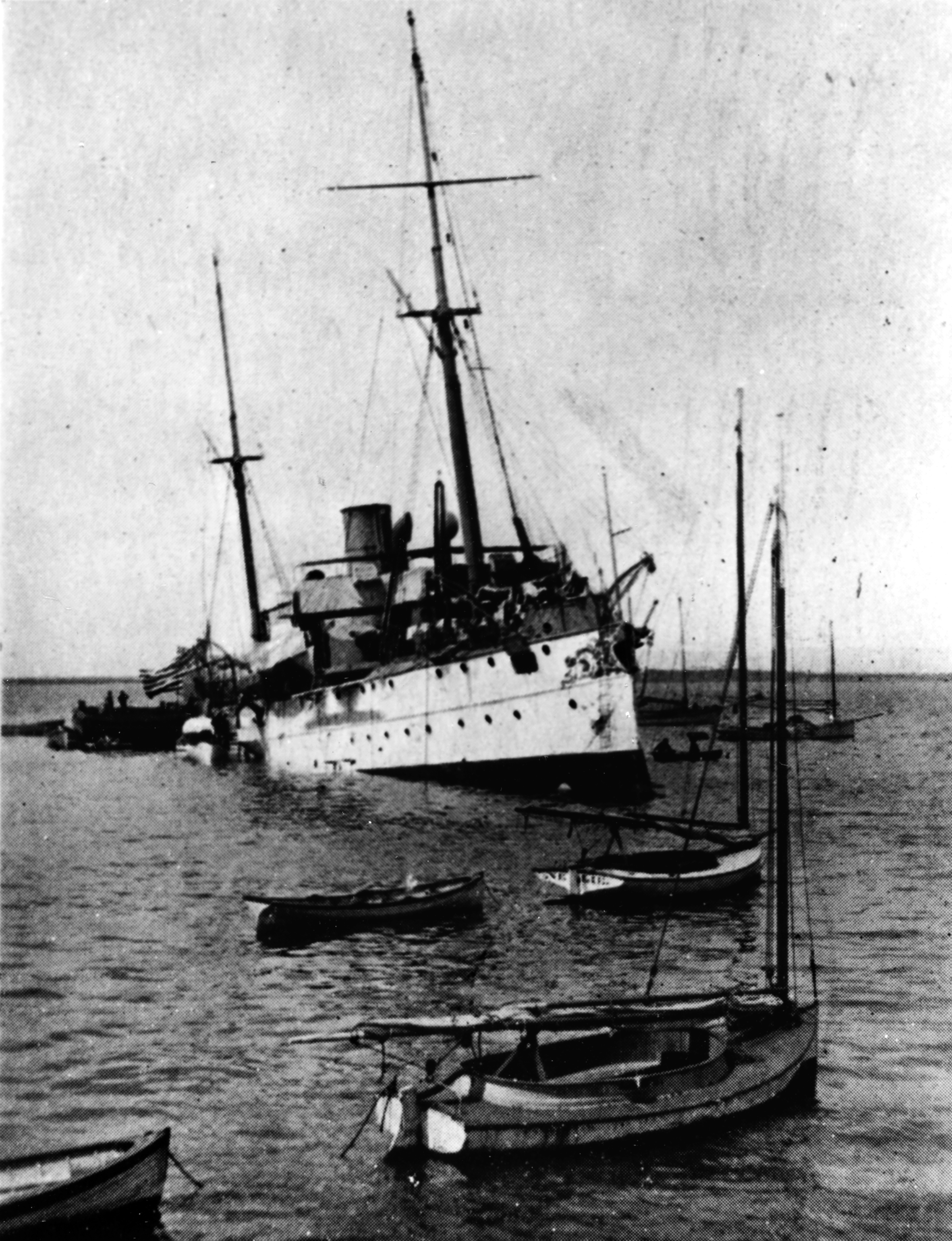
Bennington after her boiler explosion in July 1905 at San Diego

Bennington was awarded to N. F. Palmer & Co. of Chester, Pennsylvania in November 1887, but her hull was subcontracted to the Delaware River Iron Shipbuilding & Engine Works which laid down her keel in June 1888. Bennington was launched in June 1890. After her June 1891 commissioning at New York, Bennington joined the Squadron of Evolution for its cruise to South America. The gunboat made two Mediterranean tours between 1892 and 1894, after which she was assigned to duties in the Pacific. She sailed the Pacific coasts of North and Central America and spent time in the Hawaiian Islands protecting American interests there. On her way to support U.S. Army operations of the Philippine–American War, Bennington claimed Wake Island for the United States. After two years in the Philippines, she returned to the United States and was taken out of commission for 18 months for repairs and refitting. After her March 1903 re-commissioning, most of the next two years were spent patrolling the Pacific coasts of North and South America.

On 21 July 1905 at San Diego, California, Bennington suffered a boiler explosion that killed 66 men and injured nearly everyone else on board. Shortly after the explosion, a tug beached the ship to prevent her from sinking. Eleven men were awarded the Medal of Honor for "extraordinary heroism" in the aftermath of the explosion. After Bennington was refloated, the damage was deemed too extensive to repair and the ship was decommissioned in September. The ship was sold for scrapping in 1910, but instead served as a water barge for the Matson Line at Honolulu from 1912. The former Bennington was scuttled off the coast of Oahu in 1924.

== Bibliography ==
- Bauer, K. Jack; Roberts, Stephen S. (1991). Register of Ships of the U.S. Navy, 1775–1990: Major Combatants. New York: Greenwood Press. ISBN 978-0-313-26202-9.
- Hardy, Osgood (May 1922). "The Itata Incident". The Hispanic American Historical Review. 5 (2). Baltimore: Board of Editors of the Hispanic American Historical Review: 195–226. doi:10.1215/00182168-5.2.195. ISSN 0018-2168.
- Silverstone, Paul H. (2006). The New Navy, 1883-1922. New York: Routledge. ISBN 978-0-415-97871-2.
- Wimmel, Kenneth (1998). Theodore Roosevelt and the Great White Fleet: American Seapower Comes of Age (1st ed.). Washington, D.C.: Brassey's. ISBN 978-1-57488-153-0.
