= Philip Hichborn =

Chief of the Navy who prepared the U.S. Fleet for the Spanish American War

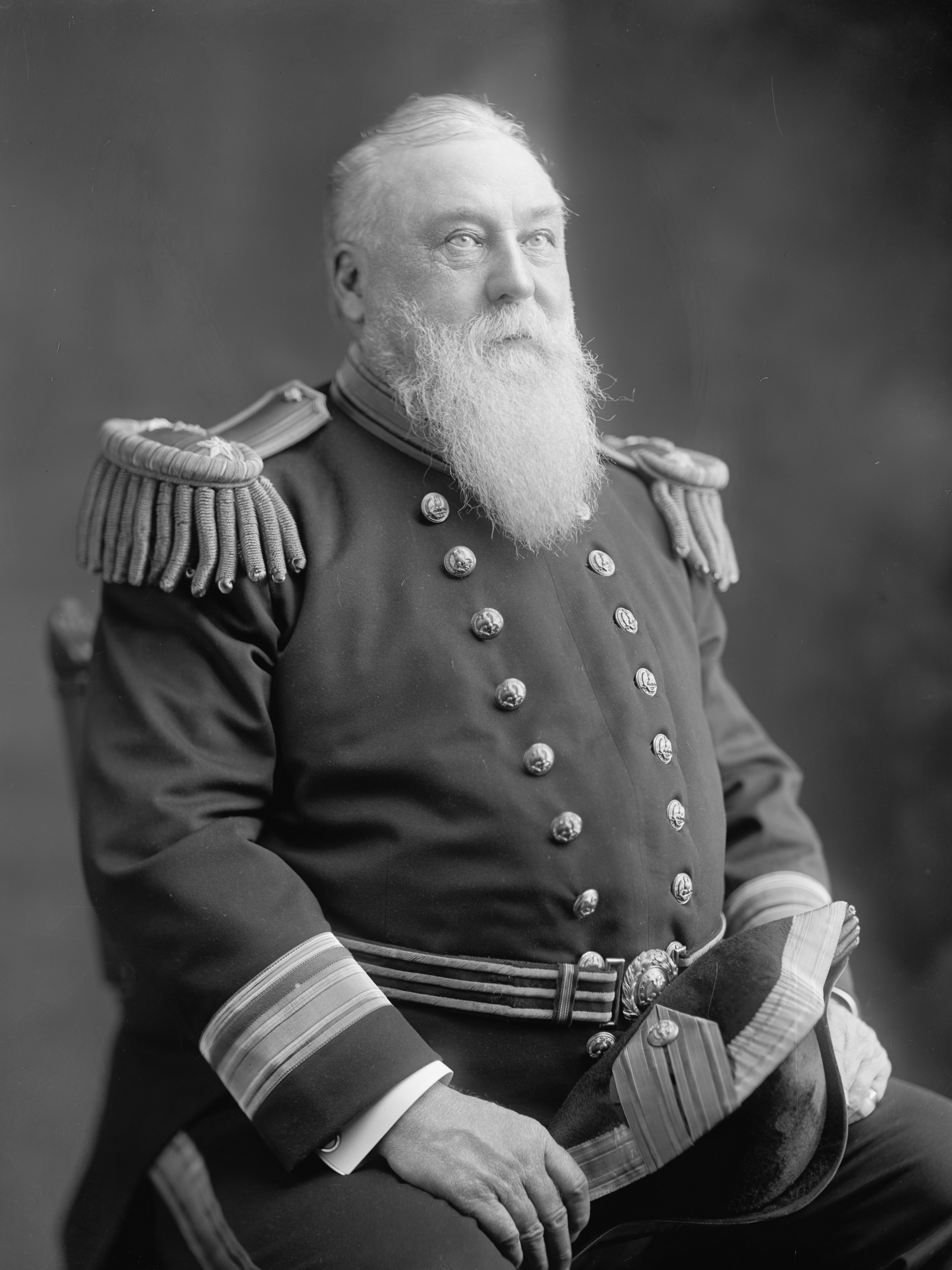

Chief Constructor and Chief of the U. S. Navy's Bureau of Construction and Repair
- In office 1893–1901

Personal details
- Born: March 4, 1839 Charlestown, Massachusetts
- Died: May 1, 1910 (aged 71) Washington, D.C.
- Resting place: Mount Auburn Cemetery
- Spouse: Jennie Mary Franklin (m. 1875)

Philip Hichborn (March 4, 1839 – May 1, 1910) was Chief Constructor and Chief of the U. S. Navy's Bureau of Construction and Repair from 1893 to 1901. He prepared the United States Fleet for the Spanish American War.

== Career ==
Hichborn was trained as a shipwright at the Boston Navy Yard. He took a sea voyage to California via Cape Horn in 1860. He worked for Pacific Mail Steamship Company. He joined the U. S. Navy in 1869 as a naval constructor. In 1884 he was sent to Europe and returned to the United States to report on the dock yards of Europe. He started work with the Bureau of Construction and Repair in 1869, becoming Chief Constructor in 1893.

== Personal life ==
Hichborn was born in Charlestown, Massachusetts, to Philip and Martha (Gould) Hichborn on March 4, 1839. He married Jennie Mary Franklin on November 29, 1875. They had four children, two of whom, Martha and Philip, survived until adulthood. His son Philip was the first husband of poet Elinor Morton Hoyt.

Philip Hichborn died at his home in Washington, D.C., on May 1, 1910, and was buried at Mount Auburn Cemetery.

== Publications ==
- Report on European dock-yards (1886)
- Chronology of the Hichborn family, 1673–1891 (1891)
- Standard designs for boats of the United States Navy. Specifications, schedule of material, weights and cost (1900)
- Standard designs for boats of the U.S. Navy (1900)
- Cruise of the Dashing Wave: rounding Cape Horn in 1860 (written 1800s, published 2009)
