= Joseph Quick (Medal of Honor) =

- Born: 1877; New York City, US
- Died: April 27, 1969 (aged 91–92); Tampa, Florida, US
- Military career
- Allegiance: United States
- Branch: United States Navy
- Service years: 1897 - 1905
- Rank: Coxswain
- Unit: USS Yorktown
- Conflicts: Philippine–American War; Boxer Rebellion
- Awards: Medal of Honor

Joseph Quick (1877 – April 27, 1969) was a United States Navy coxswain who received the Medal of Honor for rescuing his USS Yorktown shipmate, Machinist's Mate Second Class Walenty Wisnieroski, from drowning on April 27, 1902, in port in Yokohama, Japan.

== Biography ==
Joseph Quick was born in 1877 in New York City. He joined the Navy from Yokohama in 1897 and retired in 1905.

He died in 1969.

== Medal of Honor citation ==
Rank and organization: Coxwain, U.S. Navy. Place and date: Yokohama, Japan, April 27, 1902. Entered service at: New York. Birth: New York. G.O. No.: 93, July 7, 1902.

Citation:

For heroism in rescuing Walenty Wisnieroski, Machinist Second Class, from drowning at Yokohama, Japan, 27 April 1902, while serving on board the U.S.S. Yorktown.

== See also ==
- List of Medal of Honor recipients during Peacetime
- List of African American Medal of Honor recipients
