= Baltimore crisis =

1891 diplomatic incident between Chile and the United States

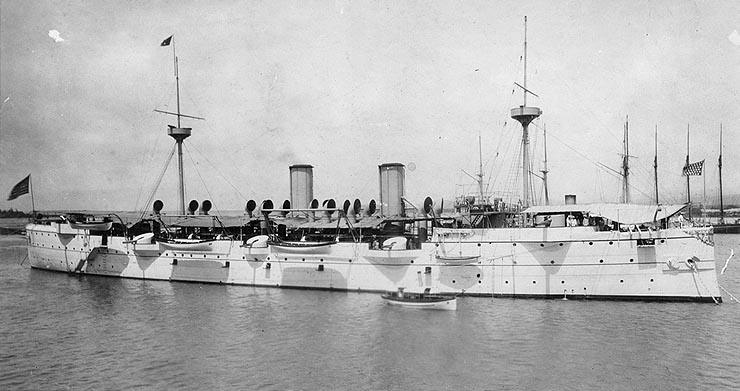
Two sailors from USS Baltimore were killed and eighteen others were wounded outside of a bar in the Chilean port of Valparaíso.

The Baltimore crisis was a diplomatic incident that took place between Chile and the United States, after the 1891 Chilean Civil War, as a result of the growing American influence in the Pacific Coast region of Latin America in the 1890s. It marked a dramatic shift in United States–Chile relations. It was triggered by the fatal stabbing of two United States Navy sailors from USS Baltimore in front of the "True Blue Saloon" in Valparaíso on October 16, 1891. The United States government demanded an apology. Chile ended the episode when it apologized and paid a $75,000 indemnity.

== Escalating tensions ==
In 1884, Chile emerged from the War of the Pacific as a potential threat to the hegemony of the United States in the Western Hemisphere. The Chilean navy, then the strongest fleet in the Pacific, was able to confront American policy. In 1882, Chile refused US mediation in the War of the Pacific. During the Panama crisis of 1885, when the United States Navy occupied Colón, then part of Colombia, the Chilean government sent its most powerful protected cruiser (which represented a serious threat to the wooden American warships) to Panama City, and ordered it not to leave until after the American forces evacuated Colon. Finally, in 1888, Chile annexed Easter Island, located some 2,000 miles (3,200 km) west of Valparaíso, and joined the ranks of imperial nations.

By 1891, however, the equation had changed. The United States possessed more naval power and, more significantly, applied the theories of Alfred Thayer Mahan to secure the growing influence of the United States in Latin America by the usage of shows of force using the now expanded navy.

During the Chilean Civil War, the American government supported the forces of President Jose Manuel Balmaceda and enforced a ban on exports for the congressional forces that was supported partially by the United Kingdom. Those and another circumstances troubled relations between the United States and the victorious congressional side, which defeated the presidential forces in 1891 to take power in Chile.

Just before the end of the Civil War, the United States sent a group of ships, including USS Charleston, to force the Chilean congressional cargo ship Itata, which had illegally loaded arms in San Diego for the congressional forces, to return to San Diego. The US ships reached Iquique before Itata. The new Chilean government ordered the ship back to San Diego to face outstanding charges.

During the war, the American-owned Central and South American Cable Company, by order of the Balmaceda administration, restored submarine telegraph cable service between Santiago and Lima, and sundered the cable connection to the congressional headquarters.

In addition, the United States minister in Santiago, Patrick Egan, gave diplomatic asylum to various insurgent congressional leaders during the war, and to Balmaceda's supporters after the war. The victorious side called upon Egan to surrender those supporters to them but was refused.

From the point of view of the congressionals, the United States had tried to stop them from purchasing weapons, denied them access to international telegraph traffic, spied on their troops, and refused to surrender war criminals.

== USS Baltimore incident ==
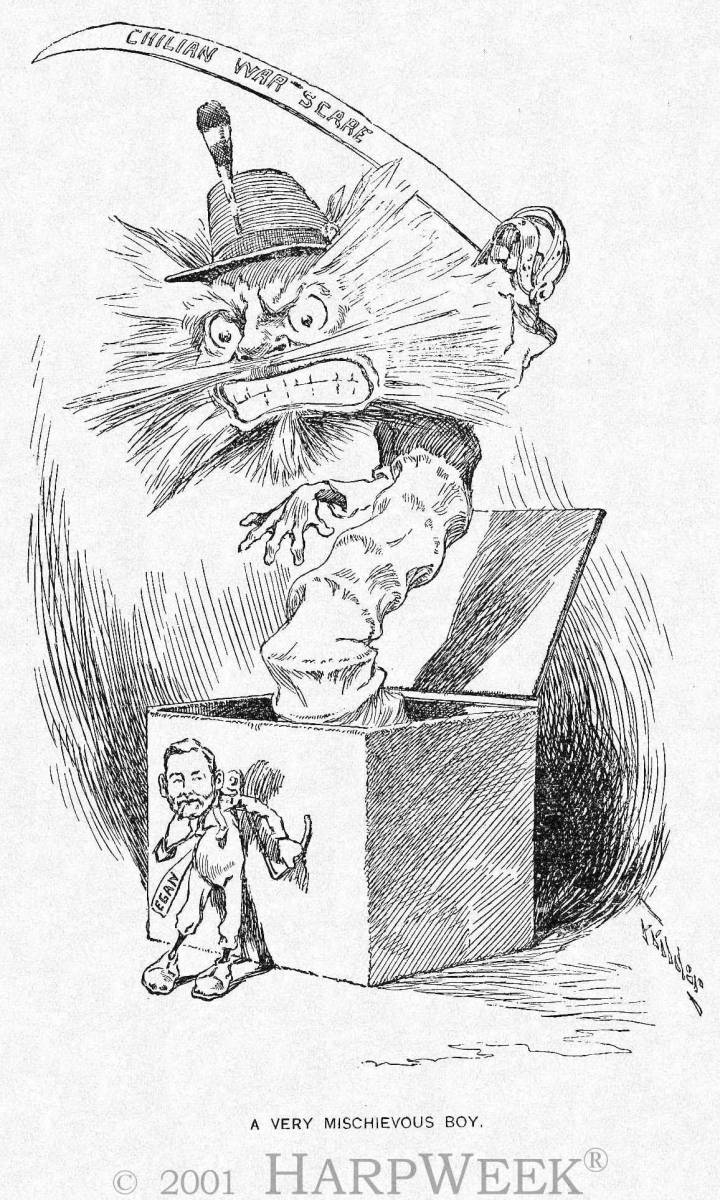
"A very mischievous Boy" Caricature of U.S. Minister Patrick Egan, who wanted to provoke a war with Chile (Harper's Weekly, November 14, 1891).

On October 16, 1891, a mob attacked a group of sailors on shore leave from the cruiser USS Baltimore outside a bar in the Chilean port of Valparaíso after one of the American sailors spat on a picture of Arturo Prat, one of Chile's national heroes. Two sailors were killed and seventeen or eighteen were injured.

The new Chilean government initially rejected American protests. It denied responsibility, and the foreign minister verbally attacked the United States. US President Benjamin Harrison demanded $75,000 in reparations. He issued an ultimatum and hinted at war. European powers favored Chile, but recognized American dominance in the region and did not intervene. Argentina and Peru had their own grievances against Chile and supported the United States. Chile capitulated to Washington's terms, apologized, and paid $75,000 in gold. Afterward it built up its navy and its European connections.

== See also ==
- Itata incident

== Primary sources ==
- Foreign Relations of the United States of America for the Year 1891. Washington, D.C.: GPO, 1892.
- Foreign Relations of the United States of America for the Year 1892. Washington, D.C.: GPO, 1893.
- The Federal Reporter. vv 47–9, 56
- Message of the President of the United States Respecting the Relations with Chile. Benjamin Harrison, Washington, D.C.: GPO, 1892, 664 pp.
- Histamar sobre el tema (in Spanish)
