= Theodore D. Wilson =

American naval architect (1840–1896)

Personal details
- Born: Theodore Delavan Wilson; May 11, 1840 Brooklyn, New York, U.S.
- Died: June 29, 1896 (aged 56) Brooklyn, New York, U.S.

Military service
- Allegiance: United States of America
- Branch/service: United States Navy
- Years of service: 1861–1896
- Rank: Chief Constructor; Instructor, Naval Architecture and Shipbuilding
- Commands: Bureau of Construction and Repair; United States Naval Academy, Annapolis, Maryland; Portsmouth Navy Yard; Philadelphia Navy Yard, Pensacola Navy Yard, Brooklyn Navy Yard
- Battles/wars: American Civil War: Battle of Hampton Roads

Theodore Delavan Wilson (also Theodore Delevan Wilson) (May 11, 1840 – June 29, 1896) was an American naval ship designer, constructor and instructor of naval architecture and shipbuilding. As chief constructor for the Bureau of Construction and Repair from 1882 to 1892, he was in charge of all new warship design for the United States Navy. Through his efforts, the Navy began its transition out of a post–Civil War slump to become a modern naval power. Warships he designed include the pre-dreadnought battleship USS Maine, whose destruction in Havana, Cuba, in 1898 precipitated the Spanish–American War.

== Life and career ==
Born in New York City, Wilson apprenticed at the Brooklyn Navy Yard under Naval Constructor B.F. Delano. At the outbreak of the American Civil War, he volunteered for U.S. Army service and served as a non–commissioned officer in the 13th New York Regiment. Upon his return from the front in August 1861, he was transferred to the U.S. Navy and was appointed as a carpenter in the construction department. He served on the USS Cambridge between 1861 and 1863. On the Cambridge he participated in the first day of the Battle of Hampton Roads against the ironclad CSS Virginia.

In 1863, Wilson was ordered on special duty to the Brooklyn Navy Yard to help direct the construction, repair and alteration of various vessels. Three years later, he passed the required examination and was commissioned an assistant naval constructor; he eventually served at naval facilities in Pensacola, Philadelphia and Washington D.C. Between 1869 and 1873, he taught naval architecture and shipbuilding at the United States Naval Academy in Annapolis, Maryland. In 1870, Wilson was sent on special duty to Great Britain and France. In Britain, he viewed vessels recently completed and under construction and toured shipbuilding and armor rolling mills. In 1873, he was promoted to naval constructor.

After Annapolis, Wilson served at the Portsmouth Navy Yard and in 1881 was appointed onto the first Naval Advisory Board for rehabilitating and modernizing the Navy. However, he, the two other naval constructors on the panel and Chief Engineer Benjamin Isherwood, dissented with the majority on its recommendations. Those were for a renewed construction of warships that would allow the Navy to take advantage of technological advances such as steel construction, help resuscitate the national economy and develop a large domestic industrial base that could support a large fleet. His dissent may have been due to limitations of domestic industry at the time, without taking into account that domestic industrial modernization had become a major goal of the Navy.

Promoted to chief constructor of the Bureau of Construction and Repair in 1882, Wilson was placed in charge of naval design for all new warships. Among the ships he planned during his service were the pre-dreadnought battleship USS Maine, the protected cruisers USS Boston, USS Chicago and USS San Francisco and the gunboats USS Bennington, USS Concord and USS Petrel. Wilson's reputation in foreign naval circles was considerable.

Wilson tendered his resignation from the Navy in 1893 due to failing health and was instead granted two years' leave; he resumed his duties at the Boston Navy Yard in 1895. He died of heat stroke the following year while supervising the undocking of the monitor USS Passaic.

== Honors ==
Wilson was an honorary member of the Royal Institution of Naval Architects in Great Britain. He was the first American to be elected to this organization. He was also a member of several scientific societies, the Loyal Legion, the Grand Army of the Republic and the Naval Order of the United States.

== Patents ==
In 1870, Wilson patented a marine "air port", which became standard use in naval and merchant marine ships. Ten years later, he patented a bolt extractor which also went into general use.

== Ships designed by Wilson (partial list) ==
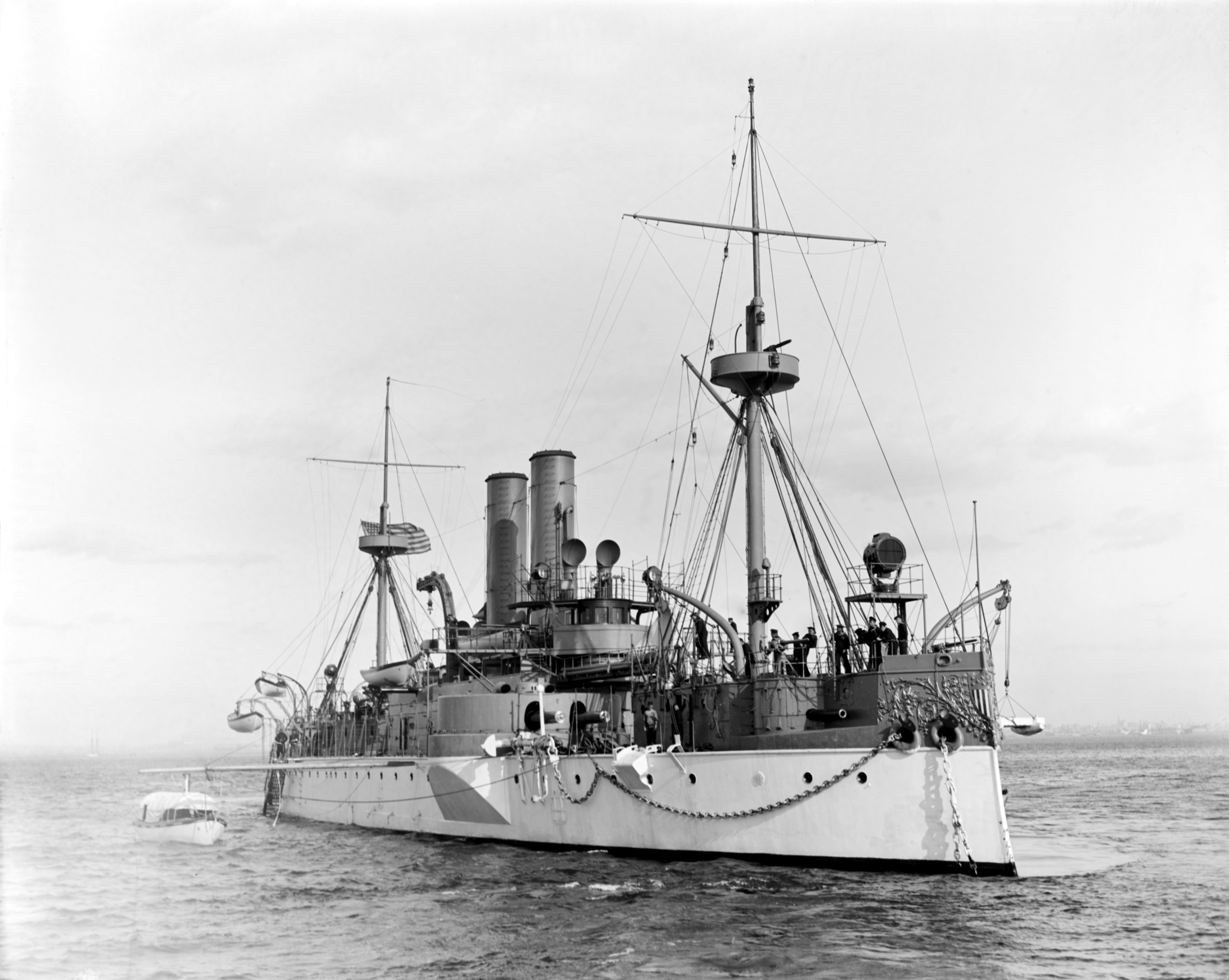
USS Maine (ACR-1)

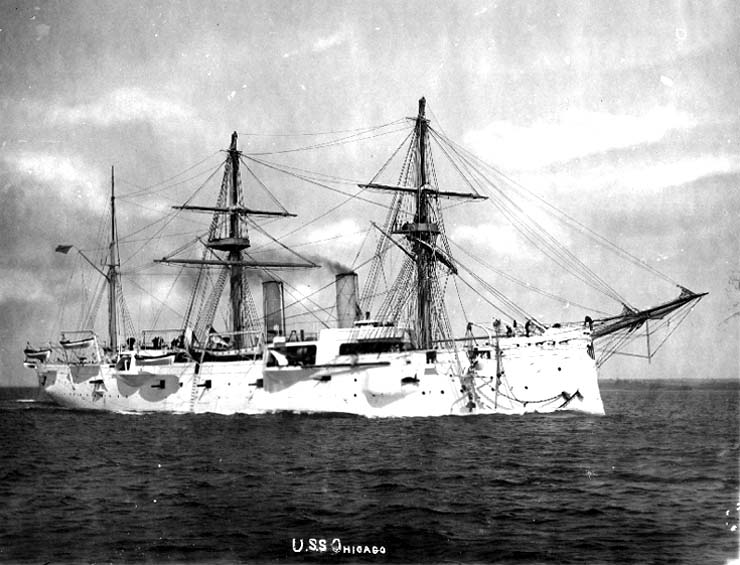
USS Chicago (CA-14)

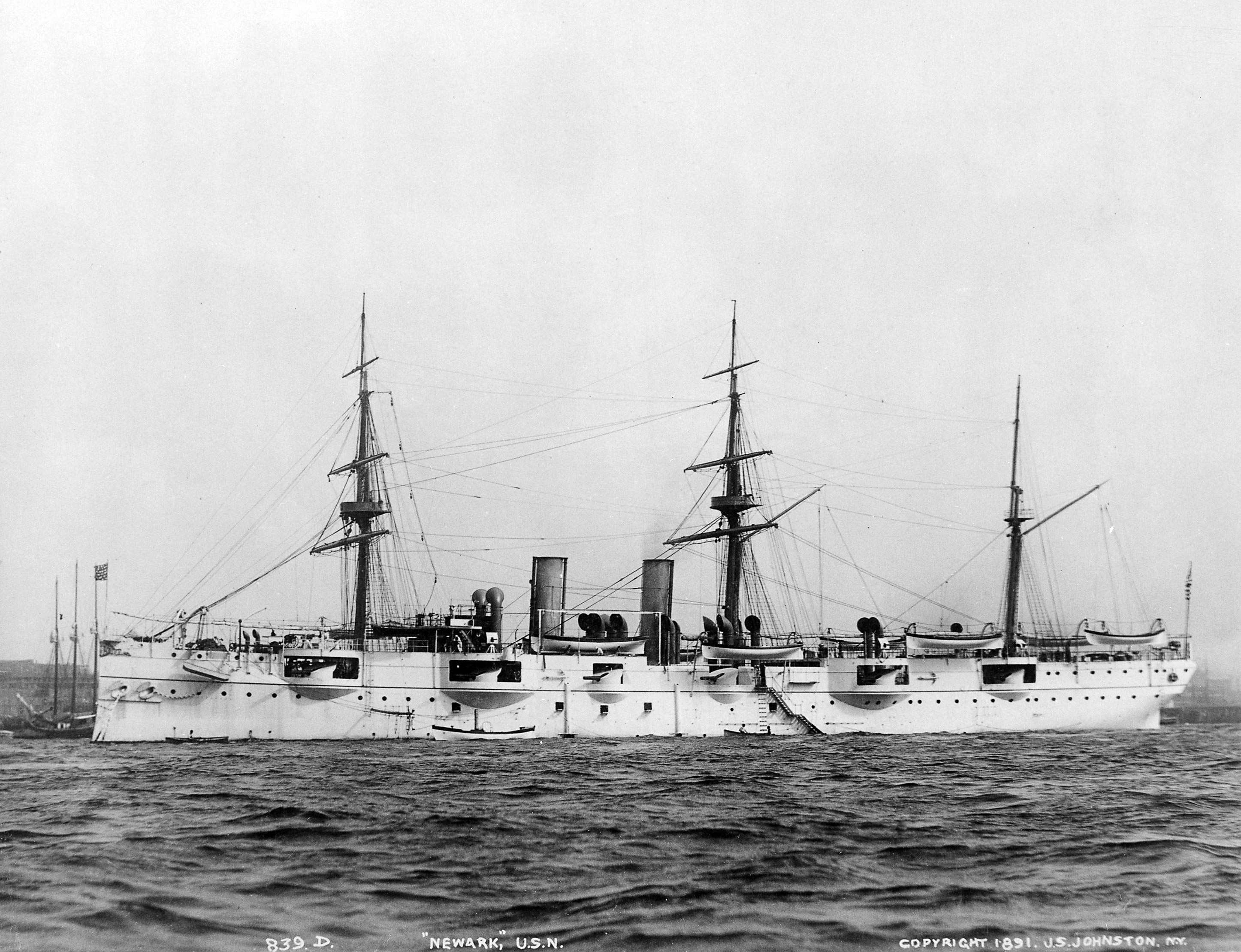
USS Newark (C-1)

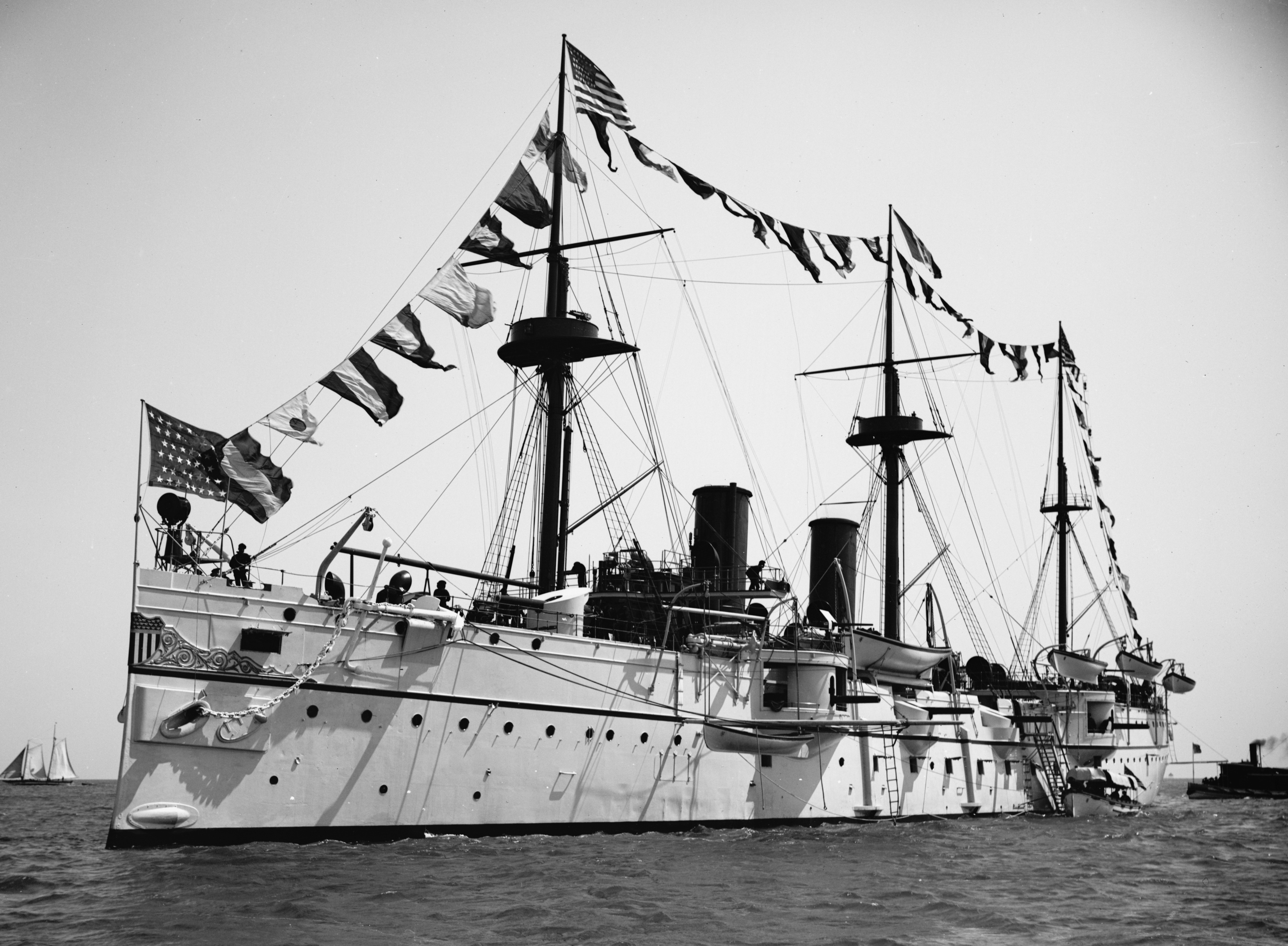
USS San Francisco (C-5)

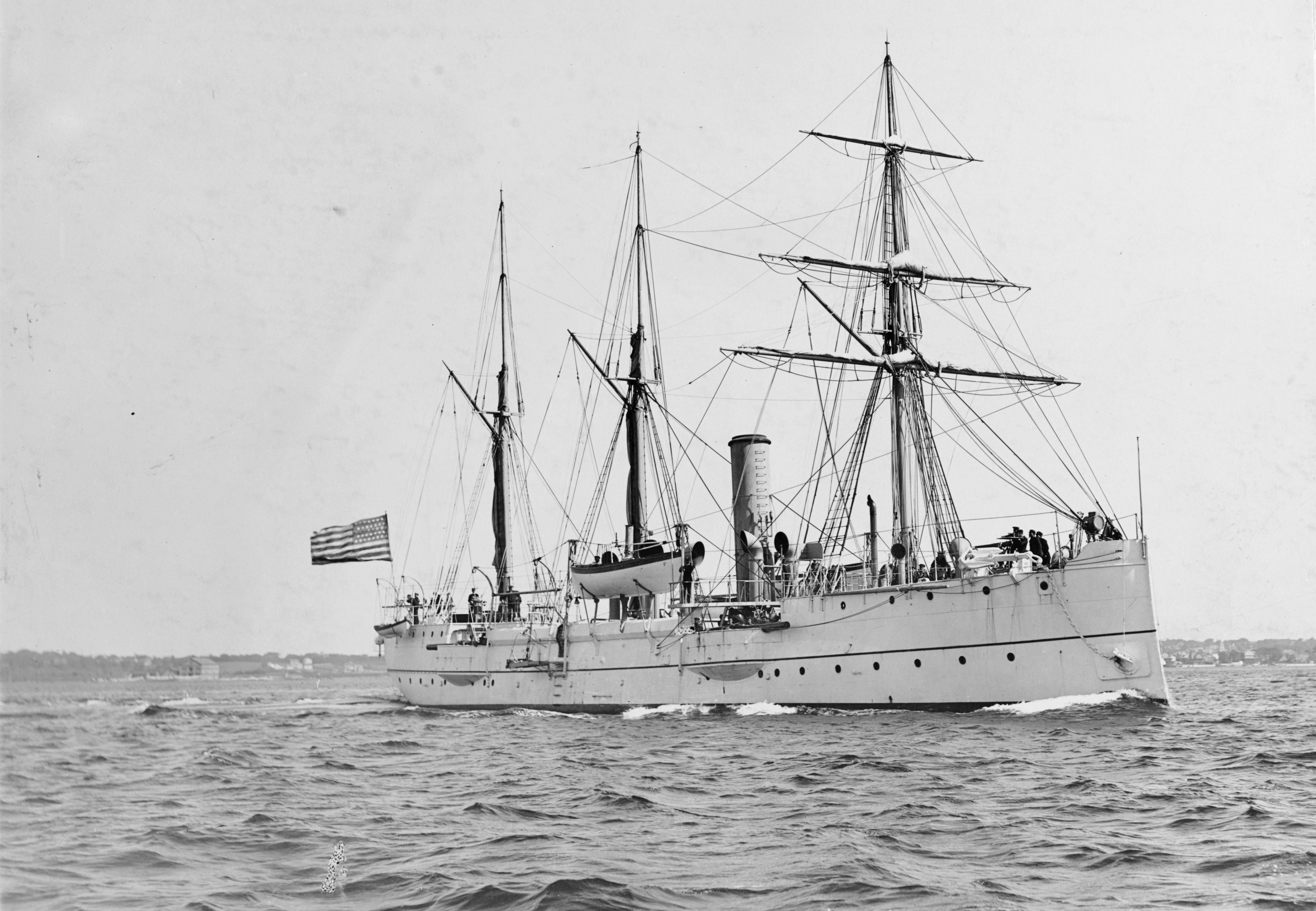
USS Petrel (PG-2)

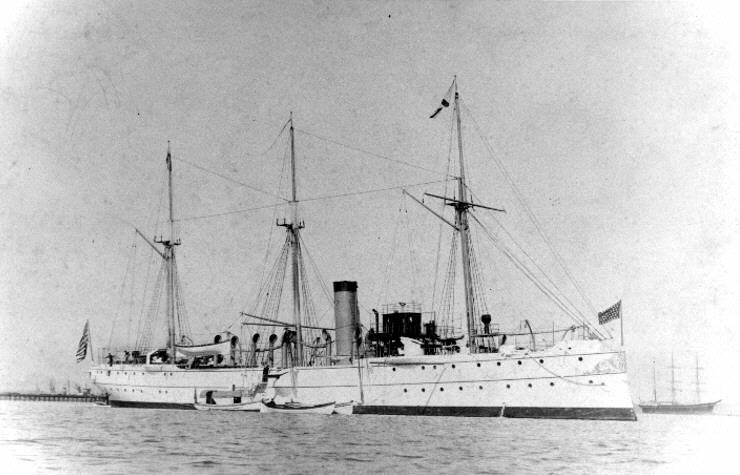
USS Concord (PG-3)

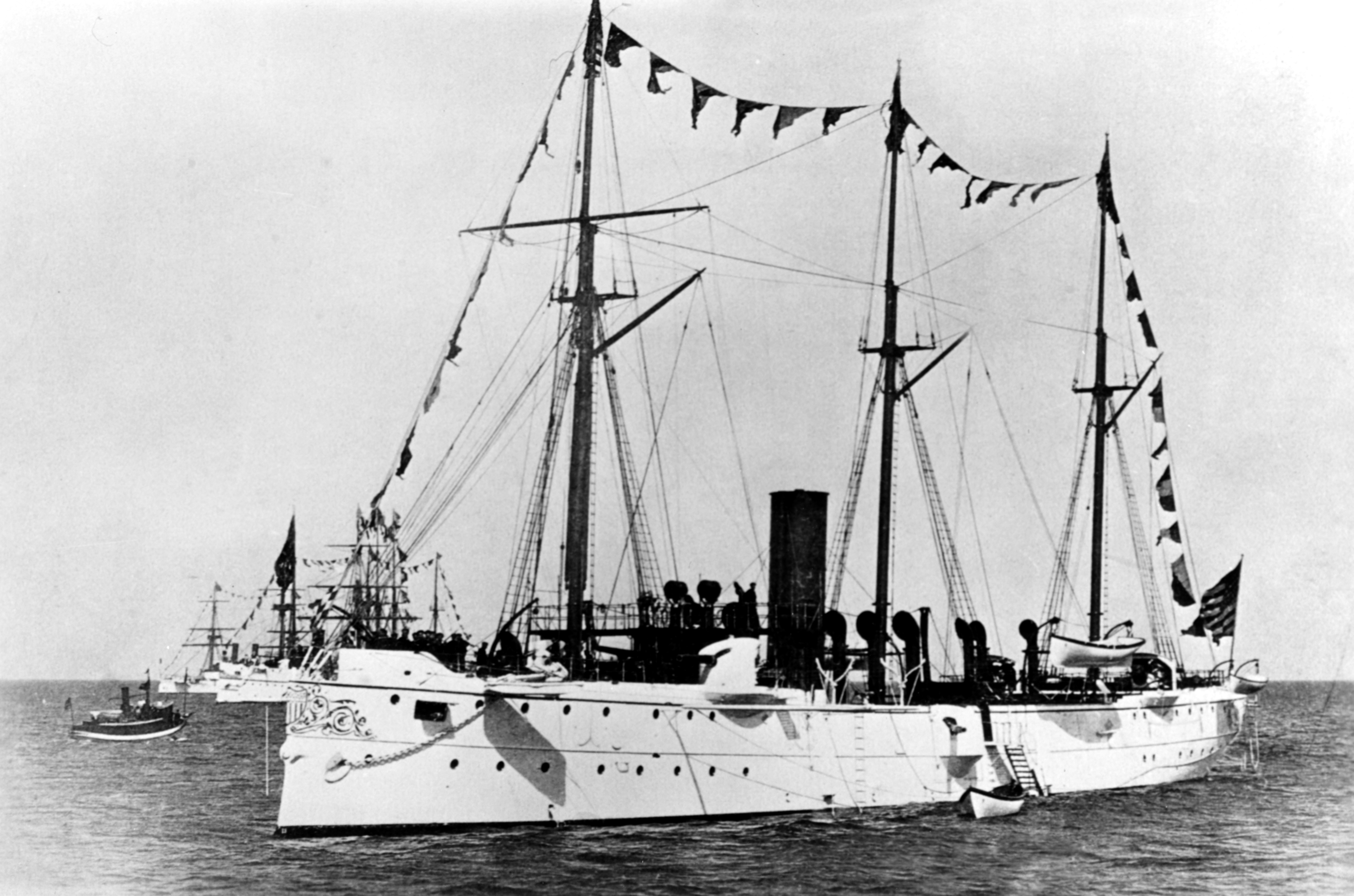
USS Bennington (PG-4)

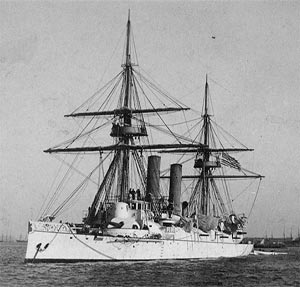
USS Boston

== Books by Wilson ==
- An Outline of Shipbuilding, Theoretical and Practical (New York: John Wiley & Son, 1873). This book was adopted as a textbook by the Naval Academy.
- Steel Ships of the U.S. Navy (Deutsch Litho. & Prtg. Co., 1893)

== Bibliography ==
- Author not listed, "Wilson, Theodore Develan" in The Encyclopedia Americana, Volume 16 (1904). Retrieved April 4, 2012.
- "Obituary Record, Theodore Delevan Wilson" in The New York Times, June 30, 1896. Retrieved April 4, 2012.
- Friedman, Norman, U.S. Cruisers: An Illustrated Design History (Naval Institute Press, 1984). ISBN 978-0-87021-718-0.
- Friedman, Norman, U.S. Destroyers: An Illustrated Design History (Naval Institute Press, 2003). ISBN 1-557-50442-3. Retrieved April 5, 2012.
- Wilson, Theodore D., "414. Report of Naval Constructor Theodore D. Wilson on British Dockyards," November 16, 1870. In Inventory of the Naval Records Collection of the Office of Naval Records and Library, in Record Group 45. Retrieved April 5, 2012.
