= Itata incident =

1891 Chilean Civil War incident with the US

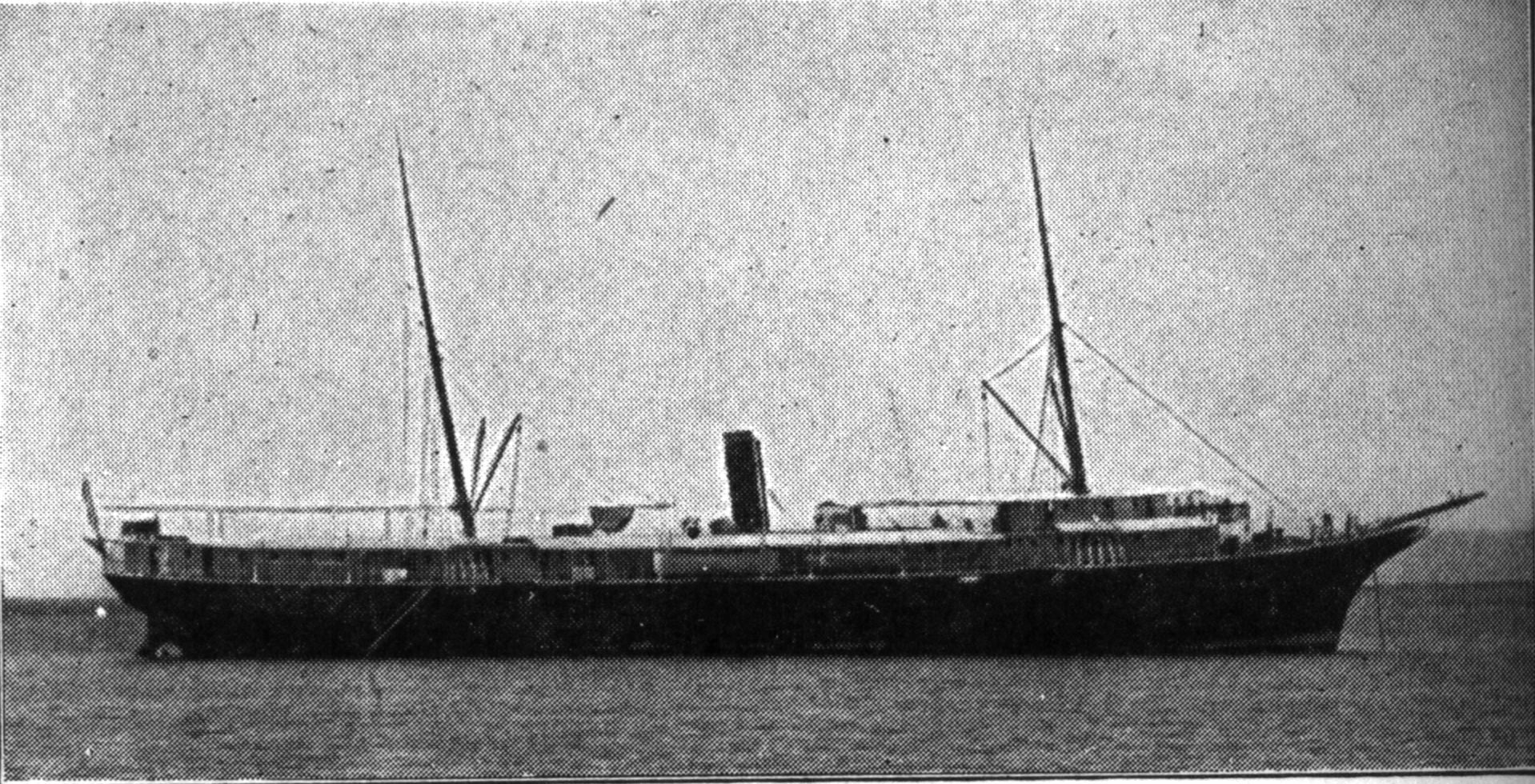
The Itata in San Diego Bay in 1891.

The Itata incident was a diplomatic affair and military incident involving the United States and Chilean insurgents during the 1891 Chilean Civil War. The incident concerned an arms shipment by the Chilean ship Itata from the United States to Chile, to assist insurgent Congressionalist forces in the war.

== Background ==
In 1891, after a series of struggles with the multinational nitrate interests, the Chilean National Congress refused to sign the national budget proposed by Chilean President José Manuel Balmaceda. Balmaceda then dissolved Congress. The Navy sided with the Congress. The Chilean Army and others sided with President Balmaceda. An armed conflict ensued.

Supporters of the Congress, including members of the dissolved parliament and their backers among multinational nitrate interests, purchased weaponry from Europe and from the United States. Supported by the navy, these forces rapidly captured Chile's northern provinces, many of which had recently been conquered from Bolivia and Peru during the War of the Pacific.

== Washington ==
The Chilean foreign minister (of Balmaceda) Prudencio Lazcano approached United States Secretary of State James Blaine for assistance. Blaine initially rebuffed Lazcano but later, with the support of his soon-to-be successor John W. Foster and against the advice of Third Under Secretary of State John Basset Moore, agreed to aid the Balmaceda administration. Moore resigned in protest at Blaine's decision.

== The U.S. arms shipment ==
Meanwhile, Ricardo Trumbull, an agent of the Chilean Congressional insurgents, was dispatched to New York. With the advice of William Russell Grace (whose nitrate company had relocated from Peru to New York in the 1860s and who had twice served as New York City mayor), Trumbull purchased for the Congressionalists some of the latest in American arms technology, including Remington rifles. He had the weaponry rail freighted to the Port of Los Angeles where it was loaded on the schooner Robert and Minnie, which intended to transfer it at sea to the Chilean steamer Itata.

=== San Diego ===
Before the rendezvous with the Robert and Minnie could take place, Itata was detained on May 6, 1891 at San Diego harbor on the orders of John W. Foster. Marshal George Gard took charge of the ship, but Gard allowed her to remain under steam and in mid-stream, ready to sail, during her detention. The next day Gard left the detention of Itata in the hands of his sole deputy and was out in the harbor searching for the Robert and Minnie, which had been reported sighted the previous day in nearby Mexican waters. At 5:30 pm on May 7 Itata raised anchor and illegally left San Diego, and carrying the deputy marshal, who was put ashore by the crew the same evening at Ballast Point. The shipment of 5000 rifles was transhipped from the schooner off one of the southern Californian islands to Itata, which then sailed for Chile.

=== Iquique ===
The United States navy dispatched several ships, under two admirals, to chase the Itata, which press reports claimed was expected to meet and supply the Chilean warship Esmeralda with arms and munitions. But both the Esmeralda and the Charleston, a US warship sent out after the Itata from San Francisco, reached the Mexican harbor at Acapulco by May 16, neither having intercepted the Itata.

The Charleston left Acapulco to join with other US ships, including the San Francisco and the Baltimore, and an international contingent including warships of the Royal Navy and the Imperial German Kaiserliche Marine to await the Itata at the Chilean harbor of Iquique. There, on June 4, U.S. Navy Rear Admirals W.P. McCann and George Brown convinced the Chilean Congressional rebels to give up the Itata and its cargo of around 5,000 rifles. The armaments were badly needed, and one month later the Congressionalists received another arms shipment from the vessel Maipo with a load of German-made Krupp arms and munitions.

== Return to US ==
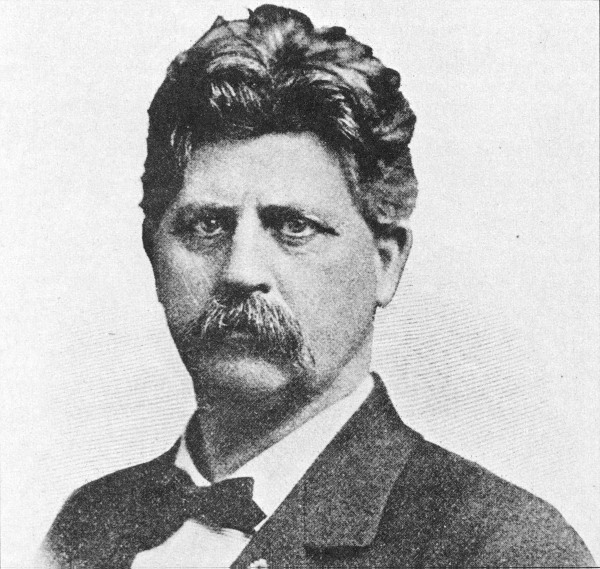
Federal prosecutor Henry Gage.

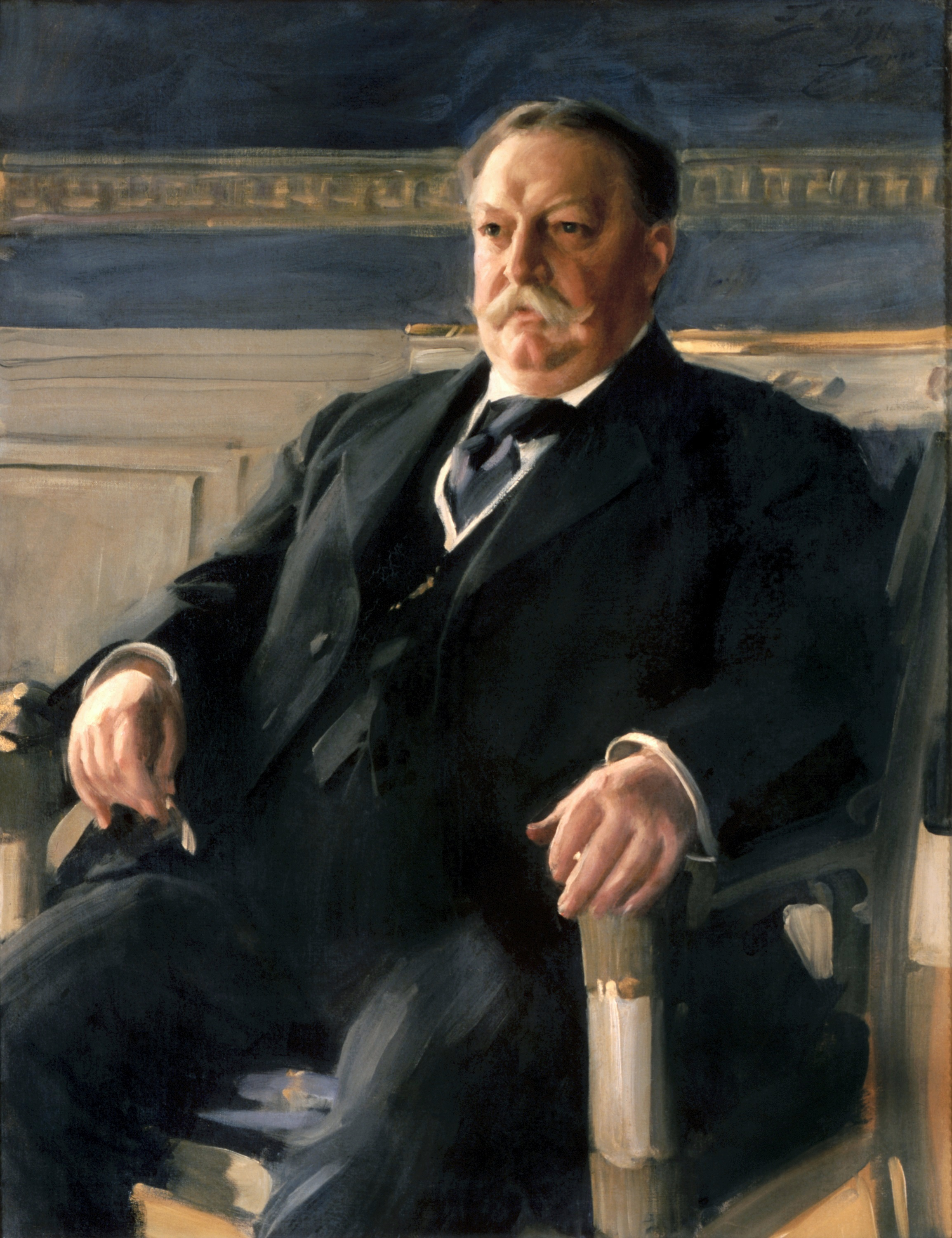
Official White House portrait of William Howard Taft in the Blue Room, 1911, oil on canvas by Anders Leonard Zorn (1860–1920), White House Collection.

After its surrender, the Itata was brought back to San Diego with its crew. The Harrison Administration appointed William Howard Taft, the US Solicitor General (and later U.S. president), and Los Angeles-based federal prosecutor Henry Gage (later Governor of California), to investigate the Itata and prosecute its crew and suppliers.

Following his investigation, Gage declined to prosecute the crew, stating his belief that the federal government had made an error regarding the matter. He also stated that he believed that the arms shipment constituted private property, and was outside of the federal government's direct jurisdiction.

Taft prosecuted the cases against the arms and against the ship, but the US government lost in each instance in the courts.

Ultimately, the Chilean congressionalists succeeded in their ouster of the Balmaceda administration and, in 1901, the Chilean steamship company, which had chartered the Itata to the congressionalist authorities, brought a case against the United States for the ship's detention, claiming the ship had acted on behalf of the legitimate provisional government. The United States and Chilean Claims Commission ruled that the seizure had been justifiable and that the US authorities had had probable cause in holding the Itata at San Diego.
