= USS Baltimore (C-3) =

Protected cruiser

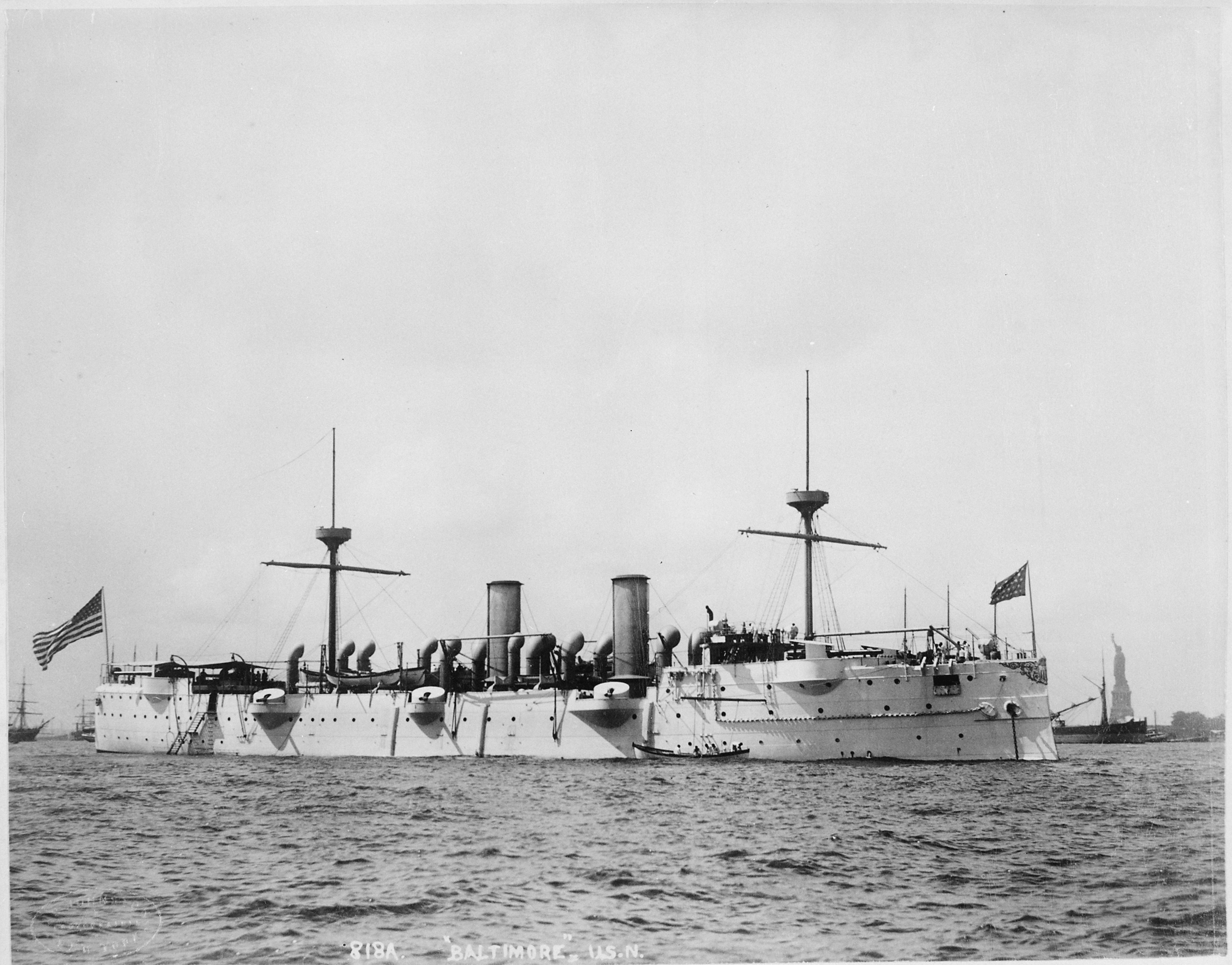
- Baltimore in 1891

History

United States
- Name: Baltimore
- Namesake: Baltimore, Maryland
- Builder: William Cramp & Sons, Philadelphia
- Cost: $1,546,172.13 (hull and machinery)
- Yard number: 254
- Laid down: 5 May 1887
- Launched: 6 October 1888
- Sponsored by: Mrs. Theodore D. Wilson, wife of Chief Constructor Wilson
- Commissioned: 7 January 1890
- Decommissioned: 15 September 1922
- Reclassified: CM-1
- Stricken: 14 October 1937
- Identification: Hull symbol:C-3; Hull symbol:CM-1
- Fate: Scuttled, 22 September 1944

General characteristics
- Type: Protected cruiser
- Displacement: 4,413 long tons (4,484 t)
- Length: 336 ft (102 m)
- Beam: 48 ft 6 in (14.78 m)
- Draft: 20 ft 6 in (6.25 m)
- Installed power: 4 × coal-fired boilers; 2 × horizontal triple expansion engines; 10,500 ihp (7,800 kW)
- Propulsion: 2 × screws
- Speed: 19 knots (35 km/h; 22 mph)
- Complement: 386 officers and men
- Armament: 4 × 8-inch (203 mm)/35 caliber Mark 4 guns; 6 × 6-inch (152 mm)/30 caliber Mark 3 guns; 4 × 6-pounder (57 mm (2.2 in)) guns; 2 × 3-pounder (47 mm (1.9 in)) guns; 2 × 1-pounder (37 mm (1.5 in)) guns; 2 × .45 caliber (11.4 mm) Gatling guns
- Armor: Gun shields: 4.5 in (110 mm); Main deck: 4 in (100 mm); Conning tower: 3 in (76 mm)

The fourth USS Baltimore (C-3) (later CM-1) was a United States Navy cruiser, the fifth protected cruiser to be built by an American yard. Like the previous one, Charleston, the design was commissioned from the British company of W. Armstrong, Mitchell, and Company of Newcastle. Baltimore was an all-around improvement on Charleston, somewhat larger with more guns, thicker armor, and better machinery.

== Design ==
Baltimore was built to plans purchased from Armstrong, a British manufacturer, which were similar to an unsuccessful Armstrong bid for the Spanish cruiser Reina Regente. Unlike the preceding Charleston, these plans included a modern triple expansion engine designed by Humphrys, Tennant & Co. Baltimore's initial cost for hull and machinery was $1,546,172.13.

Baltimore was armed with four 8-inch (203 mm)/35 caliber Mark 4 guns in sponsons on either side of the bow and stern, and six 6-inch (152 mm)/30 caliber Mark 3 guns in sponsons along the sides. Secondary armament was four 6-pounder (57 mm (2.2 in)) guns, two 3-pounder (47 mm (1.85 in)) Hotchkiss revolving cannon, two 1-pounder (37 mm (1.5 in)) Hotchkiss revolving cannon, and two .45 caliber (11.4 mm) Gatling guns. Four 14-inch (356 mm) torpedo tubes were included in the design but never mounted.

Baltimore had 4.5 in (110 mm) gun shields and a 3 in (76 mm) thick armored conning tower. The armored deck was up to 4 in (100 mm) on its sloped sides and 2.5 in (64 mm) elsewhere.

The as-built engineering plant included four coal-fired cylindrical boilers producing steam for two horizontal triple expansion engines totaling 10,750 ihp (8,020 kW) for a designed speed of 19 knots (35 km/h; 22 mph), although 20 knots (37 km/h; 23 mph) was achieved on trials. Baltimore was among the first US Navy ships with the more powerful and efficient triple expansion engines. Unlike some contemporary designs, no sails were fitted. Baltimore carried 400 tons of coal for a range of 3,838 nmi (7,108 km; 4,417 mi) at 10 kn (19 km/h; 12 mph); this could be increased to 850 tons for 8,155 nmi (15,103 km; 9,385 mi).

Baltimore also was a testbed for a new kind of stockless anchor designed by Herbert O. Dunn. The anchor showed itself in the best sight and was later adopted as the US Navy standard.

=== Refits ===
Baltimore was rebuilt between 1900 and 1903 with the armament replaced by 12 6-inch (152 mm)/40 caliber Mark 7 guns, the 8-inch guns being removed. The secondary armament was replaced (or augmented) by six 3-inch (76 mm)/50 caliber guns. The boilers were replaced with eight Babcock & Wilcox boilers. In 1913 and 1914 she was converted into a minelayer at the Charleston Navy Yard with four 6"/40 guns and a capacity of 180 mines. In an armament upgrade for World War I, between 1917 and 1918, her guns were replaced with four 5-inch (127 mm)/51 caliber guns and two 3-inch (76 mm)/50 caliber anti-aircraft guns.

== Construction and Service history ==
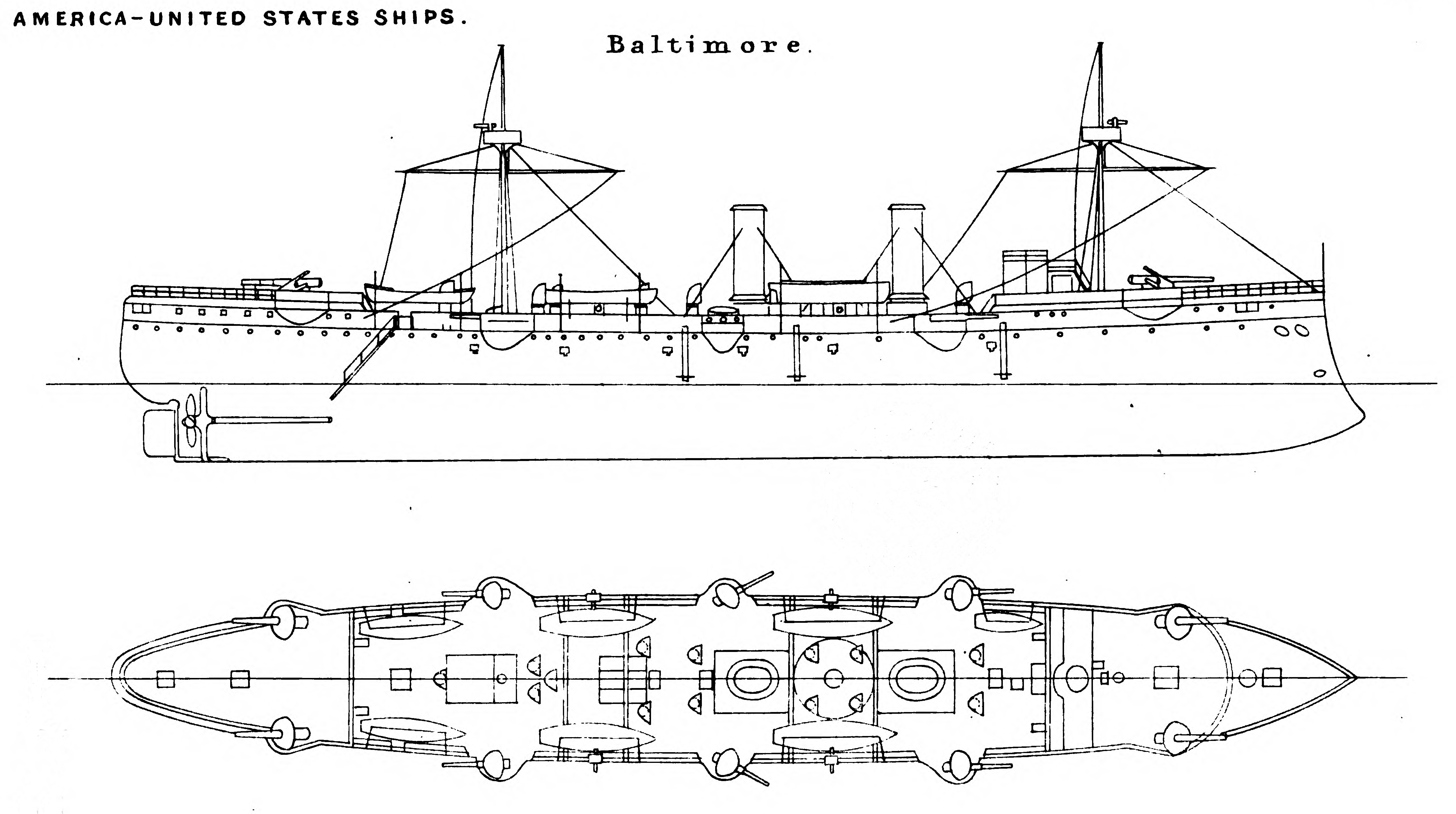
Drawing showing the side and top view of the Baltimore

She was launched on 6 October 1888 by William Cramp & Sons Ship and Engine Building Company, in Philadelphia, sponsored by Mrs. Theodore D. Wilson, wife of Chief Constructor Theodore D. Wilson; and commissioned on 7 January 1890, with Captain W. S. Schley in command.

=== Pre-Spanish–American War ===
Baltimore became the flagship of the North Atlantic Squadron on 24 May 1890, and, from 15 to 23 August, conveyed the remains of the late Captain John Ericsson from New York City to Filipstad in Värmland, Sweden.

After cruising in European and Mediterranean waters with the European Squadron, she arrived at Valparaíso, Chile on 7 April 1891 to join the Pacific Squadron. She protected American citizens during the Chile revolution and landing men at Valparaíso on 28 August. Her activities in Chile around this time became known as the Baltimore Crisis where two United States Navy sailors from its crew were stabbed in front of the True Blue Saloon on 16 October 1891. Arriving at the Mare Island Navy Yard on 5 January 1892, she cruised on the west coast of the U.S. until 7 October and then returned to the Atlantic. She took part in the naval rendezvous and review in Hampton Roads during March and April 1893, prior to the World's Columbian Exposition. Proceeding via the Suez Canal, she cruised as flagship of the Asiatic Station from 22 December 1893 to 3 December 1895, protecting American interests. Returning to Mare Island on 21 January 1896, she went out of commission on 17 February.

=== Spanish–American War ===
Recommissioned on 12 October 1897, Baltimore sailed on 20 October for the Hawaiian Islands and remained there from 7 November 1897 to 25 March 1898. She then joined Commodore George Dewey's squadron at Hong Kong on 22 April. The squadron sailed from Mirs Bay, China on 27 April for the Philippines, and on the morning of 1 May entered Manila Bay and destroyed the Spanish fleet stationed there. Baltimore was second in line behind Olympia. In the Battle of Manila Bay, Baltimore was commanded by future Rear Admiral Nehemiah Dyer, who had served with Farragut at Mobile Bay.

Baltimore remained in the Philippines on the Asiatic Station as the Spanish–American War transitioned into the Philippine–American War, convoying transports and protecting American interests until 23 May 1900, when she sailed for the United States, via the Suez Canal, arriving at New York on 8 September. In one instance, just before the outbreak of the Philippine–American War, the Baltimore sailed for Iloilo City accompanying troops whose mission was to occupy the city before General Martin Delgado's forces, loosely part of Emilio Aquinaldo's Philippine Revolutionary Army, could do so. When the American forces arrived, General Delgado already occupied the city in the name of the Federal State of the Visayas. After several weeks of a tense but peaceful stand-off, American troops and ships, including the Baltimore withdrew to Manila without landing on either Panay or Guimaras islands.

=== Pre-World War I ===
Between 27 September 1900 and 6 May 1903, Baltimore was out of commission at New York Navy Yard. From 5 August to 23 December, she served with the Caribbean Squadron, North Atlantic Fleet, taking part in summer maneuvers off the coast of Maine, in the Presidential Review at Oyster Bay, New York (15–17 August), and in Santo Domingo waters. From 28 May to 26 August 1904, she was attached to the European Squadron and cruised in the Mediterranean. On 26 September, she sailed from Genoa, Italy, for the Asiatic Station and spent the next two years cruising in Asiatic, Philippine, and Australian waters.

Baltimore returned to New York on 24 April 1907 and went out of commission at New York Navy Yard on 15 May. On 20 January 1911, she was placed in commission in reserve and served as a receiving ship at Charleston Navy Yard (30 January 1911 – 20 September 1912). From 1913 to 1914, she was converted to a minelayer at the Charleston Navy Yard and recommissioned on 8 March 1915. From 1915 to 1918, she carried out mining experiments and operations in the Chesapeake Bay and along the Atlantic coast.

=== World War I ===
At the time of the American entry into World War I, Baltimore was training personnel. Early in March 1918, she was detailed to assist in laying a deep minefield off the north coast of Ireland in the North Channel. She arrived at the Clyde on 8 March, and, from 13 April to 2 May, laid approximately 900 mines in the North Channel. On 2 June, she joined Mine Squadron 1 at Inverness, Scotland, and for four months participated in laying the North Sea Mine Barrage between the Orkney Islands and Norway by laying a total of 1,260 mines:

- planting 180 mines during the 1st minelaying excursion on 7 June,
- planting 180 mines during the 3rd minelaying excursion on 14 July,
- planting 180 mines during the 4th minelaying excursion on 29 July,
- planting 180 mines during the 5th minelaying excursion on 8 August,
- planting 180 mines during the 6th minelaying excursion on 18 August,
- planting 180 mines during the 7th minelaying excursion on 26 August, and
- planting 180 mines during the 9th minelaying excursion on 20 September.

On 28 September, Baltimore sailed from Scapa Flow, Orkney Islands back to the U.S. She carried out mining experiments in the vicinity of the Virgin Islands until the end of the year.

=== Inter-war period ===
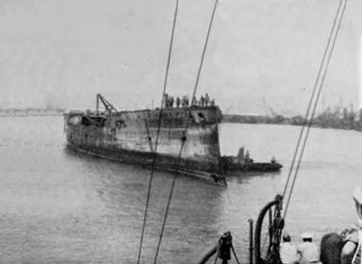
USS Baltimore in partially salvaged condition being examined by Seabees of the 133rd Naval Construction Battalion at Naval Station Pearl Harbor

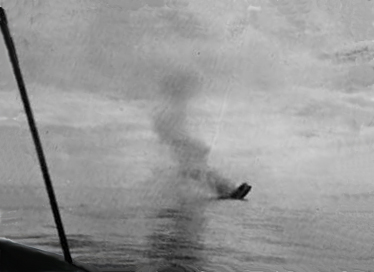
USS Baltimore being scuttled by Seabees.

In September 1919, she joined the Pacific Fleet, received the designation CM-1 (cruiser minelayer), and remained on the West Coast until January 1921. She then proceeded to Pearl Harbor, where she was subsequently placed out of commission on 15 September 1922.

She then served as a receiving ship at Pearl Harbor until she was stricken on 14 October 1937. Her hulk remained at Pearl Harbor and was present during the Japanese attack there on 7 December 1941.

== Fate ==
She was sold for scrapping on 16 February 1942, but she was eventually towed out to sea and scuttled by Seabee demolition men on 22 September 1944. In August 2017, the wreck was discovered by Hawaii Undersea Research Laboratory (HURL) off the south shore of Oahu. In September 2017, Baltimore was revisited by the Okeanos Explorer and surveyed in detail for photogrammetry.

== Bibliography ==
- Bauer, K. Jack; Roberts, Stephen S. (1991). Register of Ships of the U.S. Navy, 1775–1990: Major Combatants. Westport, Connecticut: Greenwood Press. ISBN 0-313-26202-0.
- Belknap, Reginald Rowan. The Yankee Mining Squadron; or, Laying the North Sea Mining Barrage (1920) Annapolis: United States Naval Institute
- Burr, Lawrence. US Cruisers 1883–1904: The Birth of the Steel Navy. Oxford: Osprey, 2008. ISBN 1-84603-267-9 OCLC 488657946
- Friedman, Norman (1984). U.S. Cruisers: An Illustrated Design History. Annapolis, Maryland: United States Naval Institute. ISBN 0-87021-718-6.
- Gardiner, Robert; Chesneau, Roger (1979). Conway's All the World's Fighting Ships 1860–1905. New York: Mayflower Books. ISBN 0-8317-0302-4.
- Linn, Brian McAllister (2000). The Philippine War: 1899–1902. Lawrence, Kansas: University Press of Kansas. ISBN 0-7006-1225-4.
- Melman, R. Stan (1998). "Question 2/81". Warship International. XXXV (4): 422. ISSN 0043-0374.
- Taylor, Michael J.H. (1990). Jane's Fighting Ships of World War I. Studio. ISBN 1-85170-378-0.
- The White Squadron. Toledo, Ohio: Woolson Spice Co., 1891. OCLC 45112425
- Wright, Christopher C. (1982). "Question 2/81". Warship International. XIX (3): 294–301. ISSN 0043-0374.
