= Bureau of Construction and Repair =

Former bureau of the U.S. Navy (1862-1940)

The Bureau of Construction and Repair (BuC&R) was the part of the United States Navy which from 1862 to 1940 was responsible for supervising the design, construction, conversion, procurement, maintenance, and repair of ships and other craft for the Navy. The bureau also managed shipyards, repair facilities, laboratories, and shore stations.

On 20 June 1940, Congress passed a law which consolidated the Bureau's functions with those of the Bureau of Engineering (BuEng), creating the Bureau of Ships (BuShips).

== History ==
The Bureau was staffed by officers of the Construction Corps (called constructors) with advanced degrees in naval architecture. Six civilian constructors were hired by the Navy in 1794 to supervise construction of the frigates authorized by Congress that year. The Bureau of Construction, Equipment, and Repairs was established in 1842 as one of the five original material bureaus replacing the former Board of Navy Commissioners. In 1862, Congress decided to replace the Bureau into three new organizations: the Bureau of Construction and Repair, the Bureau of Steam Engineering (later called the Bureau of Engineering), and the Bureau of Equipment. The Bureau of Construction and Repair was established by Congress by an act of July 5, 1862 (12 Stat. 510). The new organization, headed by a Chief of the Bureau, was responsible for all aspects of ship construction, except for propulsion systems, which were the responsibility of the Bureau of Engineering; and equipage, which fell under the Bureau of Equipment.

The Construction Corps was created in 1866 to be staffed by constructors graduated from the United States Naval Academy cadet-engineer curriculum implemented in 1864. The Construction Corps provided permanent naval status for personnel who had formerly been employed in a civilian capacity on an as-needed basis. Naval constructors gained the rank and recognition previously available to doctors of the Medical Corps and pursers of the Supply Corps. Two cadet-engineers of the Naval Academy class of 1879, Frances Bowles and Richard Gatewood, set the standard for postgraduate education of Construction Corps officers. Bowles and Gatewood completed postgraduate work in England in the developing science of naval architecture. The postgraduate program shifted to the Massachusetts Institute of Technology in 1901.

The Bureau of Equipment was discontinued in 1910, and formally abolished in 1914. Its functions were divided between the Bureau of Construction and Repair and the Bureau of Steam Engineering. These two bureaus were placed under the supervision of the Coordinator of Shipbuilding in 1939, and were superseded by the Bureau of Ships in 1940. The "engineering duty only" (EDO) designation of Bureau of Engineering officers expanded to include naval architects of the Construction Corps when the Bureau of Ships was formed in 1940.

The consolidation with BuEng into BuShips had its origins when USS Anderson, first of the Sims-class destroyers to be delivered, was found to be heavier than designed and dangerously top-heavy in early 1939. It was determined that an underestimate by BuEng of the weight of a new machinery design was responsible, and that BuC&R did not have sufficient authority to detect or correct the error during the design process. Initially, Acting Secretary of the Navy Charles Edison proposed consolidation of the design divisions of the two bureaus. When the bureau chiefs could not agree on how to do this, he replaced both chiefs in September 1939. The consolidation was finally effected by a law passed by Congress on 20 June 1940.

=== Chiefs of the Bureau ===
Individuals who served as Chief of the Bureau include:

- Commodore David Conner, September 1, 1842 - March 1, 1843
- Captain Beverly Kennon, March 2, 1843 - April 9, 1844
- Commodore Charles Morris, April 10, 1844 - May 31, 1847
- Commodore Charles W. Skinner, June 1, 1847 - February 28, 1852
- Commodore William B. Shubrick, March 1, 1852 - June 30, 1853
- Chief Naval Constructor Samuel Hartt, July 1, 1853 - November 16, 1853
- Chief Naval Constructor John Lenthall, November 17, 1853 - January 22, 1871
- Chief Constructor Isaiah Hanscom, January 23, 1871 - April 27, 1877
- Chief Constructor John W. Easby, April 28, 1877 - December 13, 1881
- Chief Constructor Theodore D. Wilson, March 3, 1882 - July 7, 1893
- Rear-Admiral Philip Hichborn, July 23, 1893–
- Rear Admiral Washington L. Capps, served 1903-1910
- Chief Constructor Richard Morgan Watt, served 1910-1914
- Rear Admiral David W. Taylor, (December 14, 1914 - July 1, 1922)
- Rear Admiral John D. Beuret, (July 1, 1922 - November 21, 1929)
- Rear Admiral George H. Rock, (November 21, 1929 – October 1, 1932)
- Rear Admiral Emory S. Land, (October 1, 1932 – March 16, 1933) - acting
- Rear Admiral Emory S. Land, (March 16, 1933 – March 16, 1937)
- Rear Admiral William G. DuBose, (March 16, 1937– ?)
- Rear Admiral Alexander H. Van Keuren, (- July, 1940 (Last Chief of BuC&R. Thereafter, also July, 1940, became Vice-Chief of new Bureau of Ships [BuShips] which supplanted BuC&R)
