= List of naval guns by caliber =

List of naval guns

This is a list of naval guns of all countries ordered by caliber.

Diameter (mm)	Weapon name	Country of origin	Period
20 mm (0.79 in)	Breda Model 35	Kingdom of Italy	World War II
20 mm (0.79 in)	Madsen 20 mm cannon	Denmark	World War II
20 mm (0.79 in)	20 mm Oerlikon	Switzerland	World War II - Cold War
20 mm (0.79 in)	20 mm Polsten	Poland	World War II - Cold War
20 mm (0.79 in)	2 cm/65 C/30	Nazi Germany	World War II
20 mm (0.79 in)	20 mm akan m/40 (Bofors 20 mm automatic gun L/70 model 1940)	Sweden	World War II - Cold War
25 mm (0.98 in)	25 mm akan m/32 (Bofors 25 mm automatic gun L/64 model 1932)	Sweden	Interwar - Cold war
25 mm (0.98 in)	1-inch Nordenfelt gun	United Kingdom	1880s - 1890s
25 mm (0.98 in)	Type 96 25 mm AT/AA Gun	Japan	World War II
25.4 mm (1.00 in)	25 mm/76 (1") 84-KM	Soviet Union	World War II
25.4 mm (1.00 in)	25 mm/79 (1") 110-PM (gun) 2M-3/8 twin over & under	Soviet Union	Cold War
25.4 mm (1.00 in)	25 mm/60 Type 61	China	Cold War - Modern
27 mm (1.1 in)	Mauser BK-27	Germany	Modern
28 mm (1.1 in)	1.1"/75 caliber gun	United States	World War II
30 mm (1.2 in)	Mk44 Bushmaster II	United States	Modern
30 mm (1.2 in)	CRN 91 Naval Gun	India	Modern
30 mm (1.2 in)	DS30B rapid fire cannon	United Kingdom	Modern
35 mm (1.4 in)	Oerlikon Millennium 35 mm Naval Revolver Gun System	Switzerland	Modern
37 mm (1.5 in)	Cannone-Mitragliera da 37/54 (Breda)	Italy	World War II
37 mm (1.5 in)	Canon de 37 mm Modèle 1925	France	World War II
37 mm (1.5 in)	QF 1-pounder pom-pom	United Kingdom	World War I - World War II
37 mm (1.5 in)	3.7 cm SK C/30	Nazi Germany	World War II
37 mm (1.5 in)	3.7 cm FlaK 36	Nazi Germany	World War II
37 mm (1.5 in)	37-mm air-defense gun M1939 (61-K)	Soviet Union	World War II - Cold War
37 mm (1.5 in)	37 mm kan M/98 (Finspång 37 mm naval gun L/35 model 1898)	Sweden-Norway	1890s - Cold War
37 mm (1.5 in)	37 mm kan M/98B (Finspång 37 mm naval gun L/39 model 1901)	Sweden-Norway	1900s - Cold War
38.1 mm (1.50 in)	38 mm kan M/84 (Nordenfelt 1½In fast shooting naval gun L/43 model 1884)	Sweden-Norway	1880s - World War I
40 mm (1.6 in)	40 mm ubakan m/32 (Bofors 40 mm submarine automatic gun L/43 model 1932)	Sweden	1930s - Cold War
40 mm (1.6 in)	40 mm akan m/36 (Bofors 40 mm automatic gun L/60 model 1936)	Sweden	1930s - Modern
40 mm (1.6 in)	40 mm akan m/48 (Bofors 40 mm automatic gun L/70 model 1948)	Sweden	Cold War - Modern
40 mm (1.6 in)	QF 2-pounder naval gun	United Kingdom	World War I - World War II
45 mm (1.8 in)	45 mm anti-aircraft gun (21-K)	Soviet Union	World War II
45 mm (1.8 in)	45 mm/78 (1.77") SM-7 Quad	Soviet Union	Cold War - Modern
46.5 mm (1.83 in)	47 mm kan M/83 (Stafsjö 47 mm Engström fast shooting naval gun L/22 model 1883)	Sweden-Norway	1880s - World War I
47 mm (1.9 in)	47 mm kan M/95 (Finspång 47 mm fast shooting naval gun L/55 model 1895)	Sweden-Norway	1880s - World War I
47 mm (1.9 in)	QF 3 pounder Hotchkiss Mk I, Mk II	France	World War I - World War II
47 mm (1.9 in)	QF 3 pounder Vickers	United Kingdom	World War I - World War II
47 mm (1.9 in)	QF 3 pounder Nordenfelt	United Kingdom	World War I - World War II
50 mm (2.0 in)	5 cm SK L/40 gun	German Empire	World War I - World War II
52 mm (2.0 in)	5.2 cm SK L/55 gun	German Empire	World War I - World War II
57 mm (2.2 in)	QF 6 pounder Hotchkiss 8 cwt Mk I, Mk II	France	World War I
57 mm (2.2 in)	QF 6 pounder Nordenfelt	United Kingdom	1880s - 1920s
57 mm (2.2 in)	QF 6 pounder 10 cwt gun Mk I	United Kingdom	World War II
57 mm (2.2 in)	S-60	Soviet Union	Cold War
57 mm (2.2 in)	57 mm/75 (2.24") AK-725 (ZIF-72) twin	Soviet Union	Cold War - Modern
57 mm (2.2 in)	57 mm/78.7 (2.24") SM-24-ZIF & ZIF-31	Soviet Union	Cold War
57 mm (2.2 in)	57 mm/81 (2.24") ZIF-71 and ZIF-75 single & Quad	Soviet Union	Cold War
57 mm (2.2 in)	57 mm kan M/89 (Maxim-Nordenfelt 57 mm fast shooting naval gun L/48 model 1889)	Sweden-Norway	1890s - World War I
57 mm (2.2 in)	57 mm kan M/89B (Finspång 57 mm fast shooting naval gun L/55 model 1889)	Sweden-Norway	1890s - Modern
57 mm (2.2 in)	57 mm kan M/92 (Maxim-Nordenfelt 57 mm fast shooting naval gun L/48 model 1892)	Sweden-Norway	1890s - Cold War
57 mm (2.2 in)	57 mm kan M/95 (Finspång 57 mm naval gun L/26 model 1895)	Sweden-Norway	1890s - Cold War
57 mm (2.2 in)	57 mm kan M/16 (Bofors 57 mm naval gun L/21 model 1916)	Sweden	World War I - Cold War
57 mm (2.2 in)	Bofors 57 mm Naval Automatic Gun L/60	Sweden	Cold War
57 mm (2.2 in)	Bofors 57 mm Naval Automatic Gun L/70	Sweden	Cold War - Modern
65 mm (2.6 in)	Canon de 65 mm Modèle 1891	France	World War I - World War II
66 mm (2.6 in)	Škoda 7 cm guns	Austria-Hungary	World War I - World War II
66 mm (2.6 in)	Škoda 7 cm K10	Austria-Hungary	World War I - World War II
66 mm (2.6 in)	6 cm vzor 30 gun (Škoda)	Czechoslovakia	World War II
70 mm (2.8 in)	Gonzalez Hontoria de 7 cm mod 1879	Spain	1879 - 1900s
75 mm (3.0 in)	Canon de 75 modèle 1897	France	World War I - World War II
75 mm (3.0 in)	Canon de 75 mm modèle 1924	France	World War II
75 mm (3.0 in)	75mm 50 caliber Pattern 1892	Russian Empire	Russo-Japanese War - World War II
75 mm (3.0 in)	Bofors 75 mm naval anti air gun L/50	Sweden	Interwar - World War II
75 mm (3.0 in)	Bofors 75 mm naval anti air gun L/55	Sweden	Interwar - World War II
76.2 mm (3.00 in)	Cannon 76/40 Model 1916	Italy	World War I - World War II
76.2 mm (3.00 in)	Cannone da 76/45 S 1911	Italy	World War I - World War II
76.2 mm (3.00 in)	76mm/L62 Allargato	Italy	Cold War - Modern
76.2 mm (3.00 in)	Otobreda 76 mm	Italy	Cold War - Modern
76.2 mm (3.00 in)	3"/23 caliber gun	United States	World War I - World War II
76.2 mm (3.00 in)	3"/50 caliber gun	United States	World War II - Cold War
76.2 mm (3.00 in)	3"/70 Mark 26 gun	United States	Cold War
76.2 mm (3.00 in)	76 mm air-defense gun M1914/15	Soviet Union	World War I - World War II
76.2 mm (3.00 in)	76 mm air defense gun M1938	Soviet Union	World War II
76.2 mm (3.00 in)	76.2 mm/55 (3") 34-K Pattern 1935	Soviet Union	World War II
76.2 mm (3.00 in)	76.2 mm/59 (3") AK-726 Twin	Soviet Union	Cold War - Modern
76.2 mm (3.00 in)	76.2 mm (3.00 in) mm/60 (3") AK-176 Single	Soviet Union	Cold War - Modern
76.2 mm (3.00 in)	QF 12 pounder 12 cwt naval gun Mk I, Mk II, Mk V	United Kingdom	1894 - 1945
76.2 mm (3.00 in)	QF 12 pounder 18 cwt naval gun	United Kingdom	World War I
76.2 mm (3.00 in)	QF 14 pounder Maxim-Nordenfelt naval gun	United Kingdom	World War I
76.2 mm (3.00 in)	QF 14 pounder naval gun Mk I & II naval gun	United Kingdom	World War I
76.2 mm (3.00 in)	QF 3-inch 20 cwt Mk I, Mk II, Mk III, Mk IV	United Kingdom	World War I - World War II
76.2 mm (3.00 in)	8 cm/40 3rd Year Type naval gun	Japan	World War I - World War II
76.2 mm (3.00 in)	8 cm/60 Type 98 naval gun	Japan	World War II
88 mm (3.5 in)	8.8 cm SK L/30 naval gun	German Empire	World War I - World War II
88 mm (3.5 in)	8.8 cm SK L/35 naval gun	German Empire	World War I - World War II
88 mm (3.5 in)	8.8 cm SK L/45 naval gun	German Empire	World War I - World War II
88 mm (3.5 in)	8.8 cm SK C/30 naval gun	Nazi Germany	World War II
88 mm (3.5 in)	8.8 cm SK C/31 naval gun	Nazi Germany	World War II
88 mm (3.5 in)	8.8 cm SK C/32 naval gun	Nazi Germany	World War II
88 mm (3.5 in)	8.8 cm SK C/35 naval gun	Nazi Germany	World War II
88 mm (3.5 in)	Bofors 8,8 cm naval anti air gun L/45	Sweden	Interwar - World War II
90 mm (3.5 in)	Canon de 90 mm Modèle 1926	France	World War II
90 mm (3.5 in)	Gonzalez Hontoria de 90 cm mod 1879	Spain	1879 – 1900s
90 mm (3.5 in)	Cannone da 90/53	Kingdom of Italy	World War II
95.3 mm (3.75 in)	RBL 20 pounder Armstrong 13 & 15 cwt	United Kingdom	1860s
100 mm (3.9 in)	Škoda 10 cm K10	Austria-Hungary	World War I
100 mm (3.9 in)	Canon de 100 mm Modèle 1891	France	1891-1945
100 mm (3.9 in)	10 cm/50 Type 88 naval gun	Japan	World War II
100 mm (3.9 in)	10 cm/65 Type 98 naval gun	Japan	World War II
100 mm (3.9 in)	Russia / USSR 100 mm/56 (3.9") B-34 Pattern 1940	Soviet Union	World War II - Cold War
100 mm (3.9 in)	Russia / USSR 100 mm/70 (3.9") CM-5 Twin Turret	Soviet Union	World War II - Cold War
100 mm (3.9 in)	French 100 mm naval gun	France	Cold War - Modern
100 mm (3.9 in)	AK-100 Naval gun	Soviet Union	Cold War - Modern
102 mm (4.0 in)	102mm 60 caliber Pattern 1911	Russian Empire	1911 - 1980
102 mm (4.0 in)	Bofors 10,2 cm submarine anti air gun L/35	Sweden	Interwar - World War II
102 mm (4.0 in)	Bofors 10,2 cm naval anti air gun L/50	Sweden	Interwar - World War II
102 mm (4.0 in)	BL 4 inch naval gun Mk I - VI	United Kingdom	1880s - 1900
102 mm (4.0 in)	BL 4 inch Mk VII 50-caliber	United Kingdom	World War I - World War II
102 mm (4.0 in)	BL 4 inch Mk VIII & XI 40-caliber	United Kingdom	World War I - World War II
102 mm (4.0 in)	BL 4 inch Mk IX naval gun 45-caliber	United Kingdom	World War I - World War II
102 mm (4.0 in)	QF 4 inch Mk I - III 40-caliber	United Kingdom	1895 - World War I
102 mm (4.0 in)	QF 4 inch Mk IV, XII, XXII 40-caliber	United Kingdom	World War I - World War II
102 mm (4.0 in)	QF 4 inch Mk V naval gun 45-caliber	United Kingdom	World War I - World War II
102 mm (4.0 in)	QF 4 inch Mk XVI naval gun 45-caliber	United Kingdom	World War II
102 mm (4.0 in)	EOC 4 inch 50 caliber	United Kingdom	World War I - World War II
102 mm (4.0 in)	QF 4 inch Mk XIX naval gun 40-caliber	United Kingdom	World War II
102 mm (4.0 in)	QF 4 inch naval gun Mk XXIII 33-caliber	United Kingdom	Cold War - Borneo confrontation
102 mm (4.0 in)	4"/40 caliber gun	United States	Spanish–American War - World War I
102 mm (4.0 in)	4"/50 caliber gun	United States	World War I - World War II
102 mm (4.0 in)	Cannon 102/35 Model 1914	Italy	World War I - World War II
102 mm (4.0 in)	Cannon 102/45	Italy	World War I - World War II
105 mm (4.1 in)	10.5 cm SK L/35	German Empire	World War I
105 mm (4.1 in)	10.5 cm SK L/40 naval gun	German Empire	1900 - 1945
105 mm (4.1 in)	10.5 cm SK L/45 naval gun	German Empire	1907 - 1945
105 mm (4.1 in)	10.5 cm SK C/32 naval gun	Nazi Germany	1932 - 1945
105 mm (4.1 in)	Bofors 10.5 cm model 1932 naval anti-air gun L/50	Sweden	Interwar - Cold War
113 mm (4.4 in)	QF 4.5 inch Mk I - V naval gun 45-caliber	United Kingdom	World War II - Cold War
113 mm (4.4 in)	4.5 inch Mark 8 naval gun 55-caliber	United Kingdom	Cold War - Modern
120 mm (4.7 in)	12 cm/12 short naval gun	Japan	World War II
120 mm (4.7 in)	Type 3 120 mm 45 caliber naval gun	Japan	World War I - World War II
120 mm (4.7 in)	12 cm/45 10th Year Type naval gun	Japan	World War II
120 mm (4.7 in)	12 cm 11th Year Type naval gun	Japan	World War II
120 mm (4.7 in)	BL 4.7 inch /45 naval gun Mk I, Mk II 45-caliber	United Kingdom	World War I - World War II
120 mm (4.7 in)	QF 4.7 inch Gun Mk I - IV 40-caliber	United Kingdom	Second Boer War - World War I
120 mm (4.7 in)	QF 4.7 inch Mk V naval gun 45-caliber	United Kingdom; Japan	World War I - World War II
120 mm (4.7 in)	QF 4.7 inch Mk VIII naval gun 40-caliber	United Kingdom	World War II
120 mm (4.7 in)	QF 4.7 inch Mk IX & XII 45-caliber	United Kingdom	World War II
120 mm (4.7 in)	4.7-inch/50-caliber Mark 3 gun	United Kingdom	World War I
120 mm (4.7 in)	QF 4.7 inch Mark XI gun 50-caliber	United Kingdom	World War II
120 mm (4.7 in)	Gonzalez Hontoria de 12 cm mod 1879	Spain	1879 – 1900s
120 mm (4.7 in)	Gonzalez Hontoria de 12 cm mod 1883	Spain	1883 – 1910s
120 mm (4.7 in)	120 mm Italian naval gun	Italy	1900s - World War II
120 mm (4.7 in)	120mm 45 caliber Pattern 1892	Russian Empire	1890s - World War II
120 mm (4.7 in)	120 mm 50 caliber Pattern 1905	Russian Empire	1905 - 1950's
120 mm (4.7 in)	12 cm kan M/94 (Bofors 12 cm naval gun L/45 model 1894)	Sweden-Norway	1890s - Cold War
120 mm (4.7 in)	12 cm kan M/11 (Bofors 12 cm naval gun L/45 model 1911)	Sweden	World War I - Cold War
120 mm (4.7 in)	12 cm kan M/24 (Bofors 12 cm naval gun L/45 model 1924)	Sweden	Interwar - Cold War
120 mm (4.7 in)	12 cm kan M/44 (Bofors 12 cm naval gun L/45 model 1944)	Sweden	Cold War
120 mm (4.7 in)	Bofors 120 mm Automatic Gun L/50	Sweden	Cold War
120 mm (4.7 in)	Bofors 120 mm Automatic Gun L/46	Sweden	Cold War
120.7 mm (4.75 in)	RBL 40 pounder Armstrong gun	United Kingdom	1860s
127 mm (5.0 in)	BL 5 inch gun Mk I - V	United Kingdom	1880s - 1900
127 mm (5.0 in)	5"/25 caliber gun	United States	1920s - World War II
127 mm (5.0 in)	5"/31 caliber gun	United States	1889-1910
127 mm (5.0 in)	5"/38 caliber gun	United States	1930s - World War II - Cold War
127 mm (5.0 in)	5"/40 caliber gun	United States	Spanish–American War - World War I
127 mm (5.0 in)	5"/50 caliber gun	United States	World War I - World War II
127 mm (5.0 in)	5"/51 caliber gun	United States	World War I - World War II
127 mm (5.0 in)	5"/54 caliber Mark 16 gun	United States	Cold War - Korean War
127 mm (5.0 in)	5"/54 caliber Mark 42 gun	United States	Cold War
127 mm (5.0 in)	5"/54 caliber Mark 45 gun	United States	Cold War - Modern
127 mm (5.0 in)	5"/62 caliber Mark 45 gun	United States	Modern
127 mm (5.0 in)	12.7 cm/50 Type 3 naval gun	Japan	1928 - World War II
127 mm (5.0 in)	12.7 cm/40 Type 89 naval gun	Japan	1932 - World War II
127 mm (5.0 in)	Otobreda 127/54 Compact	Italy	Cold War
127 mm (5.0 in)	Otobreda 127/64	Italy	Modern
128 mm (5.0 in)	12.7 cm SK C/34 naval gun	Nazi Germany	1930s - World War II
130 mm (5.1 in)	Type H/PJ38 130 mm naval gun	People's Republic of China	Modern
130 mm (5.1 in)	130 mm/55 B7 Pattern 1913	Russian Empire	World War I - World War II
130 mm (5.1 in)	130 mm/50 B13 Pattern 1936	Soviet Union	World War II - Cold War
130 mm (5.1 in)	AK-130	Soviet Union	Cold War
130 mm (5.1 in)	Canon de 130 mm Modèle 1919	France	World War II
130 mm (5.1 in)	Canon de 130 mm Modèle 1924	France	World War II
130 mm (5.1 in)	Canon de 130 mm Modèle 1932 and 1935	France	World War II
133 mm (5.2 in)	QF 5.25 inch Mark I	United Kingdom	World War II - Cold War
138 mm (5.4 in)	Canon de 138 mm Modèle 1893 naval gun	France	World War I
138 mm (5.4 in)	Canon de 138 mm Modèle 1910 naval gun	France	World War I - World War II
138 mm (5.4 in)	Canon de 138 mm Modèle 1927	France	World War II
138 mm (5.4 in)	Canon de 138 mm Modèle 1929	France	World War II - Cold War
140 mm (5.5 in)	Gonzalez Hontoria de 14 cm mod 1883	Spain	1883 – 1900s
140 mm (5.5 in)	BL 5.5 inch/ 50 Mk I	United Kingdom	1914 - 1940s
140 mm (5.5 in)	14 cm/50 3rd Year Type naval gun	Japan	1914 - World War II
140 mm (5.5 in)	14 cm/40 11th Year Type naval gun	Japan	1922 - World War II
140 mm (5.5 in)	Skoda 14 cm/56 naval gun	Czechoslovakia	1932 - World War II
149.1 mm (5.87 in)	Škoda 15 cm K10	Austria-Hungary	World War I
149.1 mm (5.87 in)	15 cm Ring Kanone L/30	German Empire	1883 - World War I
149.1 mm (5.87 in)	15 cm SK L/35	German Empire	1883 - World War I
149.1 mm (5.87 in)	15 cm SK L/40 naval gun	German Empire	World War I - World War II
149.1 mm (5.87 in)	15 cm SK L/45	German Empire	World War I - World War II
149.1 mm (5.87 in)	15 cm SK C/25	Nazi Germany	1930s - World War II
149.1 mm (5.87 in)	15 cm SK C/28	Nazi Germany	World War II
149.1 mm (5.87 in)	15 cm TbtsK C/36 naval gun	Nazi Germany	World War II
152.4 mm (6.00 in)	Cannon 152/32 Model 1887	Italy	1887-1910
152.4 mm (6.00 in)	Cannone da 152/45	Italy	World War I / World War II
152.4 mm (6.00 in)	152 mm /53 Italian naval gun Models 1926 and 1929	Italy	World War II
152.4 mm (6.00 in)	152 mm /55 Italian naval gun Models 1934 and 1936	Italy	World War II
152.4 mm (6.00 in)	Canon de 152 mm Modèle 1930	France	World War II
152.4 mm (6.00 in)	BL 6 inch 80 pounder gun	United Kingdom	1880s - 1890s
152.4 mm (6.00 in)	BL 6 inch gun Mk II - VI	United Kingdom	1880s - 1900s
152.4 mm (6.00 in)	BL 6 inch Mk VII 45-caliber	United Kingdom	World War I
152.4 mm (6.00 in)	BL 6 inch Mk XI naval gun 50-caliber	United Kingdom	World War I - World War II
152.4 mm (6.00 in)	BL 6 inch Mk XII naval gun 45-caliber	United Kingdom	World War I - World War II
152.4 mm (6.00 in)	BL 6 inch naval guns Mk XIII – XVIII	United Kingdom	World War I - World War II
152.4 mm (6.00 in)	BL 6 inch Mk XXII naval gun 50-caliber	United Kingdom	1920s - World War II
152.4 mm (6.00 in)	BL 6 inch Mk XXIII naval gun 50-caliber	United Kingdom	World War II
152.4 mm (6.00 in)	QF 6 inch Mk I - III 40-caliber	United Kingdom	1892 - 1945
152.4 mm (6.00 in)	Type 41 6 inch 40 caliber	Japan	1908 - 1945
152.4 mm (6.00 in)	15 cm/45 41st Year Type	Japan	1904 - 1945
152.4 mm (6.00 in)	15 cm/50 41st Year Type	Japan	World War I - World War II
152.4 mm (6.00 in)	6 inch 35 caliber naval gun 1877	Russian Empire	1880s - 1910s
152.4 mm (6.00 in)	152 mm 45 caliber Pattern 1892	Russian Empire	1890s - 1980s
152.4 mm (6.00 in)	15,2 cm kan M/98 (Bofors 15 cm naval gun L/42 model 1898)	Sweden-Norway	1890s - Cold War
152.4 mm (6.00 in)	15,2 cm kan M/03 (Bofors 15 cm naval gun L/50 model 1903)	Sweden-Norway	1900s - Cold War
152.4 mm (6.00 in)	15,2 cm kan M/30 (Bofors 15 cm naval gun L/55 model 1930)	Sweden	Interwar - Cold War
152.4 mm (6.00 in)	15,2 cm kan M/42 (Bofors 15 cm naval automatic gun L/53 model 1939)	Sweden	World War II - Modern
152.4 mm (6.00 in)	6"/30 caliber gun	United States	1900s - World War I
152.4 mm (6.00 in)	6"/40 caliber gun	United States	1900s - World War I
152.4 mm (6.00 in)	6"/50 caliber Mark 6 and 8 guns	United States	1900s - World War I - World War II
152.4 mm (6.00 in)	6"/53 caliber Mark 12, 14, 15 and 18 guns	United States	1920s - World War II
152.4 mm (6.00 in)	6"/47 caliber Mark 16 and 17 gun	United States	World War II - 1970s
155 mm (6.1 in)	Canon de 155 mm Modèle 1920 50-caliber	France	World War II
155 mm (6.1 in)	Advanced Gun System	United States	Modern
155 mm (6.1 in)	MONARC	Germany	Modern
155 mm (6.1 in)	15.5 cm/60 3rd Year Type	Japan	World War II
160 mm (6.3 in)	RML 64 pounder 64 cwt gun	United Kingdom	1860s - 1880s
160 mm (6.3 in)	Gonzalez Hontoria de 16 cm mod 1879	Spain	1883 – 1900s
160 mm (6.3 in)	Gonzalez Hontoria de 16 cm mod 1883	Spain	1879 – 1910s
164 mm (6.5 in)	Canon de 164 mm Modèle 1893	France	World War I - World War II
172.6 mm (6.80 in)	17 cm SK L/40 gun	German Empire	World War I - World War II
178 mm (7.0 in)	7"/44 caliber gun	United States	1900s
178 mm (7.0 in)	RBL 7 inch Armstrong gun	United Kingdom	1860s
178 mm (7.0 in)	RML 7 inch gun	United Kingdom	1860s - 1890s
180 mm (7.1 in)	Gonzalez Hontoria de 18 cm mod 1879	Spain	1879 – 1900s
180 mm (7.1 in)	Gonzalez Hontoria de 18 cm mod 1883	Spain	1883 – 1910s
180 mm (7.1 in)	180mm Pattern 1931-1933	Soviet Union	World War II
190 mm (7.5 in)	Škoda 19 cm vz. 1904	Austria-Hungary	World War I
190.5 mm (7.50 in)	BL 7.5-inch naval howitzer	United Kingdom	World War I
190.5 mm (7.50 in)	BL 7.5 inch Mk I naval gun 45-caliber	United Kingdom	World War I
190.5 mm (7.50 in)	BL 7.5 inch Mk II - V naval gun various 50-caliber guns	United Kingdom	World War I
190.5 mm (7.50 in)	BL 7.5 inch Mk VI naval gun 45-caliber	United Kingdom	1920s - World War II
190.5 mm (7.50 in)	Cannone da 190/45	United Kingdom; Italy	Balkan Wars - World War I - World War II
194 mm (7.6 in)	Canon de 194 mm Modèle 1893-1896 40-caliber	France	1893-1930
194 mm (7.6 in)	Canon de 194 mm Modèle 1902 gun 50-caliber	France	World War I - World War II
200 mm (7.9 in)	Gonzalez Hontoria de 20 cm mod 1879	Spain	1879 - 1900s
200 mm (7.9 in)	Gonzalez Hontoria de 20 cm mod 1883	Spain	1883 - 1910s
203 mm (8.0 in)	RML 8 inch 9 ton gun	United Kingdom	1860s - 1880s
203 mm (8.0 in)	BL 8 inch Mk I - VII naval gun	United Kingdom	1880s - 1900s
203 mm (8.0 in)	BL 8 inch Mk VIII naval gun	United Kingdom	1920s - 1950s
203 mm (8.0 in)	EOC 8 inch 40 caliber	United Kingdom	1893 - 1945
203 mm (8.0 in)	EOC 8 inch 45 caliber	United Kingdom	1895 - 1945
203 mm (8.0 in)	8"/30 caliber gun	United States	1886 - 1906
203 mm (8.0 in)	8"/35 caliber gun	United States	1880s - 1920s
203 mm (8.0 in)	8"/45 caliber gun	United States	1900s - 1930s
203 mm (8.0 in)	8"/55 caliber gun	United States	1920s - 1970s
203 mm (8.0 in)	8"/55 caliber Mark 71 gun	United States	1975 - 1978
203 mm (8.0 in)	20.3 cm/45 Type 41 naval gun	Japan	World War I - World War II
203 mm (8.0 in)	20 cm/12 short naval gun	Japan	World War II
203 mm (8.0 in)	20 cm/50 3rd Year Type No.2	Japan	World War II
203 mm (8.0 in)	203mm/50 Modèle 1924 gun	France	1920s - 1940s
203 mm (8.0 in)	203mm/55 Modèle 1931 gun	France	1930s - 1940s
203 mm (8.0 in)	203 mm /50 Model 1924	Italy	World War II
203 mm (8.0 in)	203 mm /53 Italian naval gun	Italy	1930s - World War II
203 mm (8.0 in)	20.3 cm SK C/34 naval gun	Nazi Germany	World War II
203 mm (8.0 in)	203mm 45 caliber Pattern 1892	Russian Empire	1895 - World War I
203 mm (8.0 in)	203 mm 50 caliber Pattern 1905	Russian Empire	1905 - 1945
204 mm (8.0 in)	ML 8 inch shell gun	United Kingdom	1820s - 1860s
206 mm (8.1 in)	68-pounder gun	United Kingdom	1840s - 1900s
210 mm (8.3 in)	21 cm L/35	German Empire	1890-1936
210 mm (8.3 in)	21 cm SK L/40	German Empire	World War I - World War II
210 mm (8.3 in)	21 cm SK L/45	German Empire	World War I - World War II
210 mm (8.3 in)	21 cm kan M/98 (Bofors 21 cm naval gun L/44 model 1898)	Sweden-Norway	1900s - World War II
228.6 mm (9.00 in)	RML 9 inch 12 ton gun	United Kingdom	1860s - 1890s
229 mm (9.0 in)	9"/35 (22.9 cm) Pattern 1877	Russian Empire	1870s - World War I
234 mm (9.2 in)	BL 9.2 inch gun Mk I - VII	United Kingdom	1880s - 1918
234 mm (9.2 in)	BL 9.2 inch Mk VIII 40-caliber	United Kingdom	1890s - 1910s
234 mm (9.2 in)	BL 9.2 inch Mk X 46-caliber	United Kingdom	1900s - World War I
234 mm (9.2 in)	BL 9.2 inch Mk XI 50-caliber	United Kingdom	World War I
240 mm (9.4 in)	240mm/50 Modèle 1902 gun	France	World War I - World War II
240 mm (9.4 in)	24 cm K L/35	German Empire	World War I - World War II
240 mm (9.4 in)	24 cm SK L/40	German Empire	World War I - World War II
240 mm (9.4 in)	Škoda 24 cm L/40 K97	Austria-Hungary	World War I
200–250 mm (7.9–9.8 in)	Paixhans guns	France	1841
254 mm (10.0 in)	10"/31 caliber gun	United States	1890s - 1921
254 mm (10.0 in)	10"/40 caliber gun Mark 3	United States	1890 - 1921
254 mm (10.0 in)	RML 10 inch 18 ton gun	United Kingdom	1868 - 1900s
254 mm (10.0 in)	BL 10 inch Mk II - IV 32-caliber guns	United Kingdom	1885 - 1900s
254 mm (10.0 in)	Cannone da 254/40 A	Kingdom of Italy	1893 - 1940s
254 mm (10.0 in)	EOC 10 inch 40 caliber	United Kingdom	1893 - 1940s
254 mm (10.0 in)	10 in/40 Type 41 naval gun	Japan	1899 - 1945
254 mm (10.0 in)	EOC 10 inch /45 naval gun	United Kingdom	1904 - 1940s
254 mm (10.0 in)	Vickers 10 inch /45 naval gun	United Kingdom	1904 - 1920s
254 mm (10.0 in)	254mm 45 caliber Pattern 1891	Russian Empire	1897 - 1930
254 mm (10.0 in)	Gonzalez Hontoria de 25,4 cm mod 1870	Spain	1870 – 1980s
254 mm (10.0 in)	Bofors 25,4 mm naval gun L/45 model 1932	Sweden	Interwar - Cold War
274 mm (10.8 in)	Canon de 274 modèle 1887/1893	France	World War I - World War II
274 mm (10.8 in)	Canon de 274 modèle 1893/1896	France	World War I - World War II
280 mm (11 in)	RML 11 inch 25 ton gun	United Kingdom	1870s - 1890s
280 mm (11 in)	Gonzalez Hontoria de 28 cm mod 1883	Spain	1883 – 1920s
283 mm (11.1 in)	283 mm kanon M/12 (Bofors 28,3 mm naval gun L/45 model 1912)	Sweden	World War I - World War II
283 mm (11.1 in)	28 cm MRK L/35	German Empire	World War I
283 mm (11.1 in)	28 cm MRK L/40	German Empire	World War I
283 mm (11.1 in)	28 cm SK L/40 gun	German Empire	World War I - World War II
283 mm (11.1 in)	28 cm SK L/50 gun	German Empire	World War I - World War II
283 mm (11.1 in)	28 cm SK C/28 naval gun	Nazi Germany	World War II
283 mm (11.1 in)	28 cm SK C/34 naval gun	Nazi Germany	World War II
305 mm (12.0 in)	RML 12 inch 25 ton gun	United Kingdom	1860s - 1870s
305 mm (12.0 in)	RML 12 inch 35 ton gun	United Kingdom	1870s
305 mm (12.0 in)	BL 12 inch naval gun Mk I - VII	United Kingdom	1880s - 1890s
305 mm (12.0 in)	BL 12 inch naval gun Mk VIII	United Kingdom	1890s - 1910s
305 mm (12.0 in)	BL 12 inch Mk X Vickers 45-caliber	United Kingdom	World War I
305 mm (12.0 in)	BL 12 inch Mk XI & XII Vickers 50-caliber	United Kingdom	World War I
305 mm (12.0 in)	BL inch Mk IX	United Kingdom	World War I
305 mm (12.0 in)	EOC 12 inch /45	United Kingdom	World War I
305 mm (12.0 in)	305mm/45 Modèle 1887 gun	France	1890s - 1910s
305 mm (12.0 in)	305mm/40 Modèle 1893 gun	France	1890s - 1910s
305 mm (12.0 in)	305mm/45 Modèle 1906 gun	France	World War I
305 mm (12.0 in)	Russian 12 inch 40 caliber naval gun	Russian Empire	1896 - World War I
305 mm (12.0 in)	Obukhovskii 12"/52 Pattern 1907 gun	Russian Empire	World War I - Cold War
305 mm (12.0 in)	305 mm /46 Model 1909	Italy	World War I - World War II
305 mm (12.0 in)	30.5 cm SK L/50 gun	German Empire	World War I
305 mm (12.0 in)	Škoda 30.5 cm /45 K10	Austria-Hungary	World War I
305 mm (12.0 in)	12"/35 caliber gun	United States	1896-1920
305 mm (12.0 in)	12"/40 caliber gun	United States	World War I
305 mm (12.0 in)	12"/45 caliber Mark 5 gun	United States	World War I
305 mm (12.0 in)	12 inch/50 caliber naval gun	United States; Argentina	World War I - World War II - Cold War
305 mm (12.0 in)	12"/50 caliber Mark 8 gun	United States	World War II - Cold War
317.5 mm (12.50 in)	RML 12.5 inch 38 ton gun	United Kingdom	1875 - 1890s
320 mm (13 in)	Gonzalez Hontoria de 32 cm mod 1883	Spain	1883 – 1920s
320 mm (13 in)	Cannone Navale da 320	Italy	World War II
330 mm (13 in)	13"/35 caliber gun	United States	1890s - 1920s
330 mm (13 in)	330mm/50 Modèle 1931 gun	France	World War II
340 mm (13 in)	340mm/28 Modèle 1881 gun	France	1880s - 1910s
340 mm (13 in)	340mm/45 Modèle 1912 gun	France	World War I - World War II
343 mm (13.5 in)	BL 13.5 inch Mk I - IV 30-caliber guns	United Kingdom	1890s - 1900s
343 mm (13.5 in)	BL 13.5 inch Mk V Vickers 45-caliber	United Kingdom	World War I
350 mm (14 in)	Škoda 35 cm K14	Austria-Hungary	World War I
356 mm (14.0 in)	EOC 14 inch /45 Marks I and III	United Kingdom; Chile	World War I - 1950s
356 mm (14.0 in)	36cm/45 41st Year Type	United Kingdom; Japan	World War I - World War II
356 mm (14.0 in)	14"/45 caliber gun	United States	World War I - World War II
356 mm (14.0 in)	14"/50 caliber gun	United States	World War I - World War II
356 mm (14.0 in)	BL 14 inch Mk VII	United Kingdom	World War II
356 mm (14.0 in)	14"/52 (35.6 cm) Pattern 1913	Russian Empire	1914 World War I
380 mm (14.96 in)	38 cm SK L/45 "Max" (Langer Max)	German Empire	World War I
380 mm (14.96 in)	38 cm SK C/34	Nazi Germany	World War II
380 mm (15 in)	380mm/45 Modèle 1935 gun	France	World War II - Cold War
381 mm (15.0 in)	BL 15 inch Mk I naval gun	United Kingdom	World War I - World War II - 1950s
381 mm (15.0 in)	Cannone navale da 381/40	Italy	World War I - World War II
381 mm (15.0 in)	381mm / 50 Model 1934 naval gun	Italy	World War II
406 mm (16.0 in)	RML 16 inch 80 ton gun	United Kingdom	1880s - 1890s
406 mm (16.0 in)	16"/45 (40.6 cm) Vickers as No. 1712A	Russian Empire	World War I
406 mm (16.0 in)	BL 16 inch Mk I naval gun	United Kingdom	World War II
406 mm (16.0 in)	16"/45 caliber Mark 1, 5 & 8 gun	United States	1920s - World War II
406 mm (16.0 in)	16"/45 caliber Mark 6 gun	United States	World War II
406 mm (16.0 in)	16"/50 caliber Mark 7 gun	United States	World War II - Cold War
406 mm (16.0 in)	406 mm/50 (16") B-37 Pattern 1937	Soviet Union	World War II
406 mm (15.98 in)	16"/50 caliber Mark 2 & 3 gun	United States	1920s - World War II
410 mm (16.14 in)	41 cm/45 3rd Year Type naval gun	Japan	World War II
412.8 mm (16.25 in)	BL 16.25 inch Mk I naval gun	United Kingdom	1890s
450 mm (17.72 in)	RML 17.72 inch gun	United Kingdom	1870s - 1900s
457 mm (18.0 in)	BL 18 inch Mk I naval gun	United Kingdom	World War I
457 mm (18.0 in)	18"/47 caliber Mark A gun	United States	1920
457 mm (18.0 in)	18"/48 caliber Mark 1 gun	United States	World War II
460 mm (18.1 in)	46 cm/45 Type 94 naval gun	Japan	World War II
530 mm (21 in)	53 cm/52 (21") Gerät 36 naval gun	Nazi Germany	World War II

== See also ==
- List of artillery
- List of the largest cannon by caliber
- Glossary of British ordnance terms
