= Anti-submarine rocket =

Naval weapon type for launching small depth charges against submarines

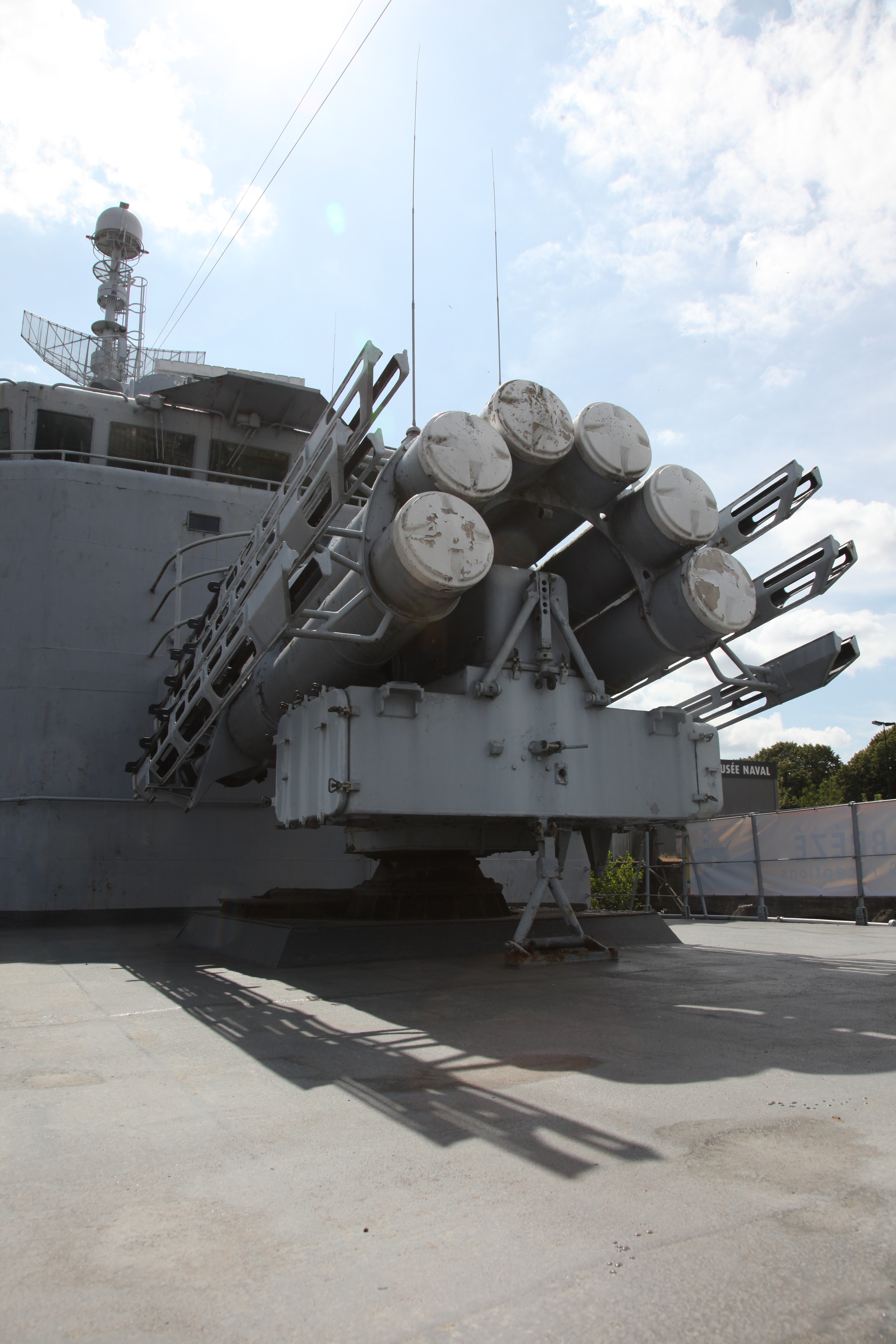
Bofors anti-submarine rocket launcher

Anti-submarine rockets and anti-submarine mortars are anti-submarine weapons deployed on surface warships for the purpose of sinking or damaging submarines with explosive charges.

Anti-submarine mortars (also known as "depth charge throwers" or "depth charge projectors" in some cases) are often larger versions of the mortar used by land armies and fire a projectile in relatively the same manner. They were created during World War II as a development of the depth charge and work on the same principle, many mortars initially using those changes as projectiles.

Anti-submarine rockets are similar to anti-submarine mortar but a comparably more modern system, using rocket propulsion instead of spigot mortars to deliver the explosive. The homing torpedo and anti-submarine rocket largely replaced the anti-submarine mortar in naval combat. The British Limbo system, with three gyro-stabilized barrels, fires 350-pound (160 kg) projectiles to a range of 1,000 yards (910 m). It remained in service with many British and Commonwealth navies until the 1980s. The Italian Menon system, introduced in 1956, was used until their retirement in the 1980s. The Elma ASW-600 anti-submarine mortar, developed by Sweden in the 1980s, is the latest weapon of the type and is still in limited use.

== Origins ==
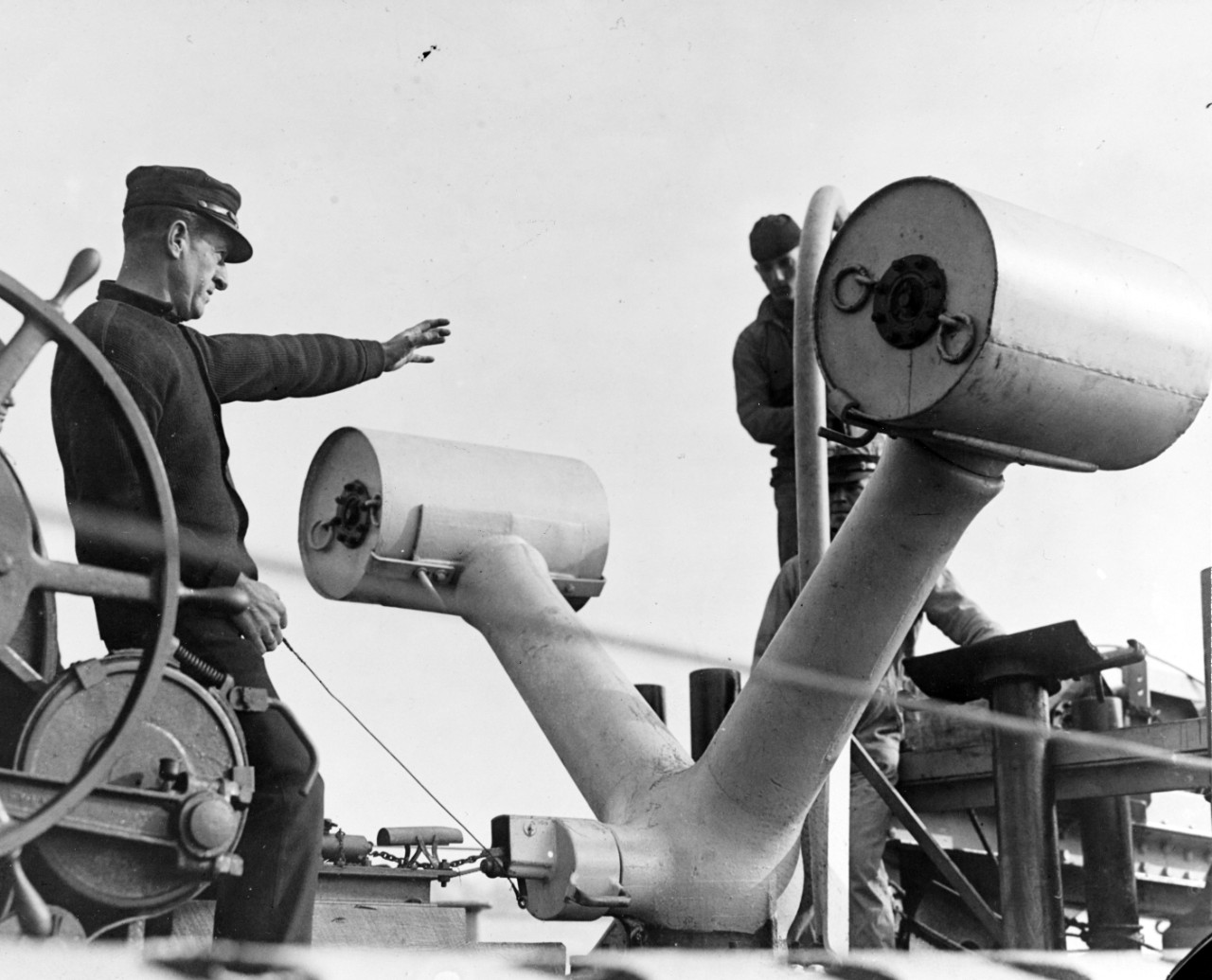
Y-gun depth charge thrower

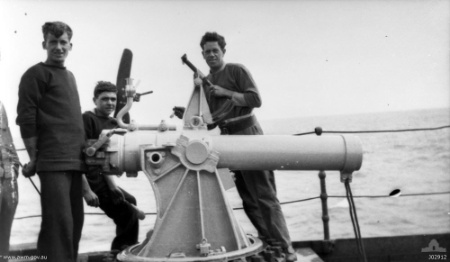
Crew of SS Orca with British BL 7.5-inch naval howitzer, an anti-submarine mortar developed in 1917

Anti-submarine warfare did not become an issue of great concern until World War I, when Germany used submarines in an attempt to strangle British shipping in the Atlantic Ocean and elsewhere. The earliest way to counter a submarine was in the form of depth charges, which were large canisters filled with explosives, rolled off the back of a ship and detonated by a hydrostatic fuze. Depth charges served well throughout World War I but were not without flaws. A ship had to pass directly over a submarine to score an effective hit, and as such, depth charges were dropped in lines instead of more effective clusters and could only be carried in ships fast enough to avoid the concussion of the explosion. The depth charges were also not as effective as one might think at sinking a submarine: only a very close detonation would sink a submarine, and the problems of scoring a direct hit meant that a submarine was more often damaged than destroyed by depth charges.

After World War I depth charge throwers were developed, which could hurl depth charges some 100 feet (30 m) from the side of a ship, perpendicular to its direction of travel. These were a significant improvement over the old method, permitting the use of large 'patterns' of up to ten depth charges from the throwers and stern depth charge rails used together. However, they still required a ship to pass very close to a submarine, which entailed a loss of sonar (ASDIC) contact during the final stages of the approach. Submarines could and did use this period to take evasive action.

=== World War I ===
It was the British who developed the first anti-submarine mortars. Several versions appeared in 1917, most notably the BL 7.5-inch naval howitzer.

=== World War II ===
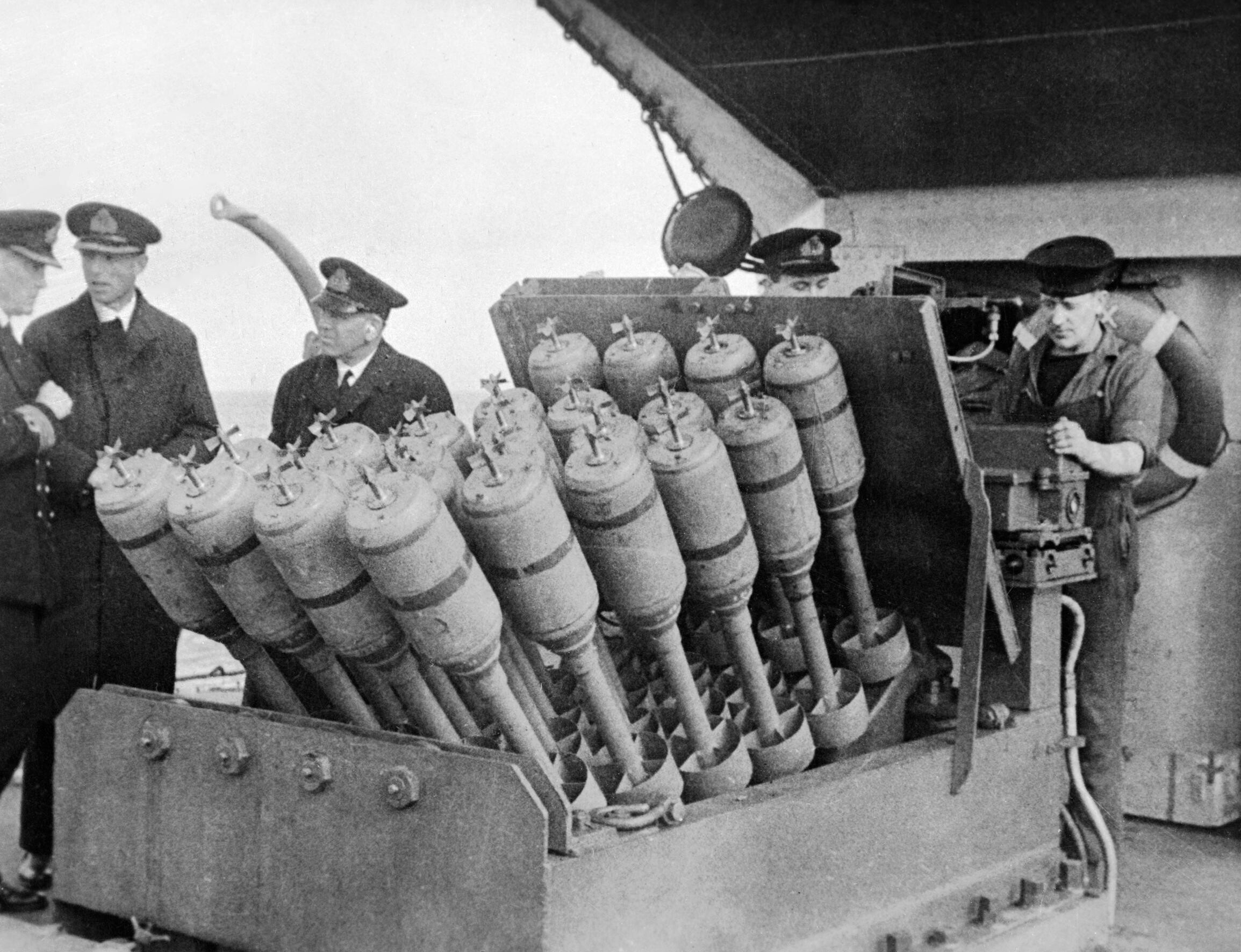
Hedgehog anti-submarine mortar on the forecastle of HMS Westcott, 28 November 1945

During World War II, submarines once again posed a major threat to Allied shipping, which necessitated the development of more effective anti-submarine mortars. These all had the common characteristic of throwing multiple charges ahead of the attacking vessel while it was still in sonar contact with a submarine. The most successful was the Hedgehog, which consisted of 24 spigot mortar rounds, each one 7 inches (180 mm) in diameter and weighing 65 pounds (29 kg) with a 35-pound (16 kg) Torpex warhead. Each projectile had a range of about 250 yards (230 m) and was fired to form a circular pattern of about 40 yds (37 metres) diameter in front of the attacking ship. While the warhead on a Hedgehog was much smaller than that of a depth charge, it scored three times as many kills than its predecessors. This was due to the use of a contact fuze on the projectile, which would only detonate on impact with a target. Since the projectile would only explode on a hit, the long periods of sonar "blackout" from the blast and turbulence of a conventional depth charge explosion were eliminated. In the later stages of World War II, the Hedgehog was complemented in British service by the Squid three-barrelled 12-inch bore depth charge mortar, which fired three 390 lb (180 kg) depth charges - with 94kg Minol explosive warheads - in a triangular pattern out to a range of 270 yd (250 m). Firing was automatic triggered by Type 147 Asdic to match the depth of the target

The US developed the first anti-submarine rocket, the Mousetrap from the Hedgehog anti-submarine mortar. The Mousetrap used the same warhead but used rocket motor propulsion enabling its use on light vessels which could not handle the recoil of multiple spigot mortars firing. The Mousetrap used fewer projectiles than Hedgehog and was fixed in position so could not compensate for roll.

== Post WWII ==
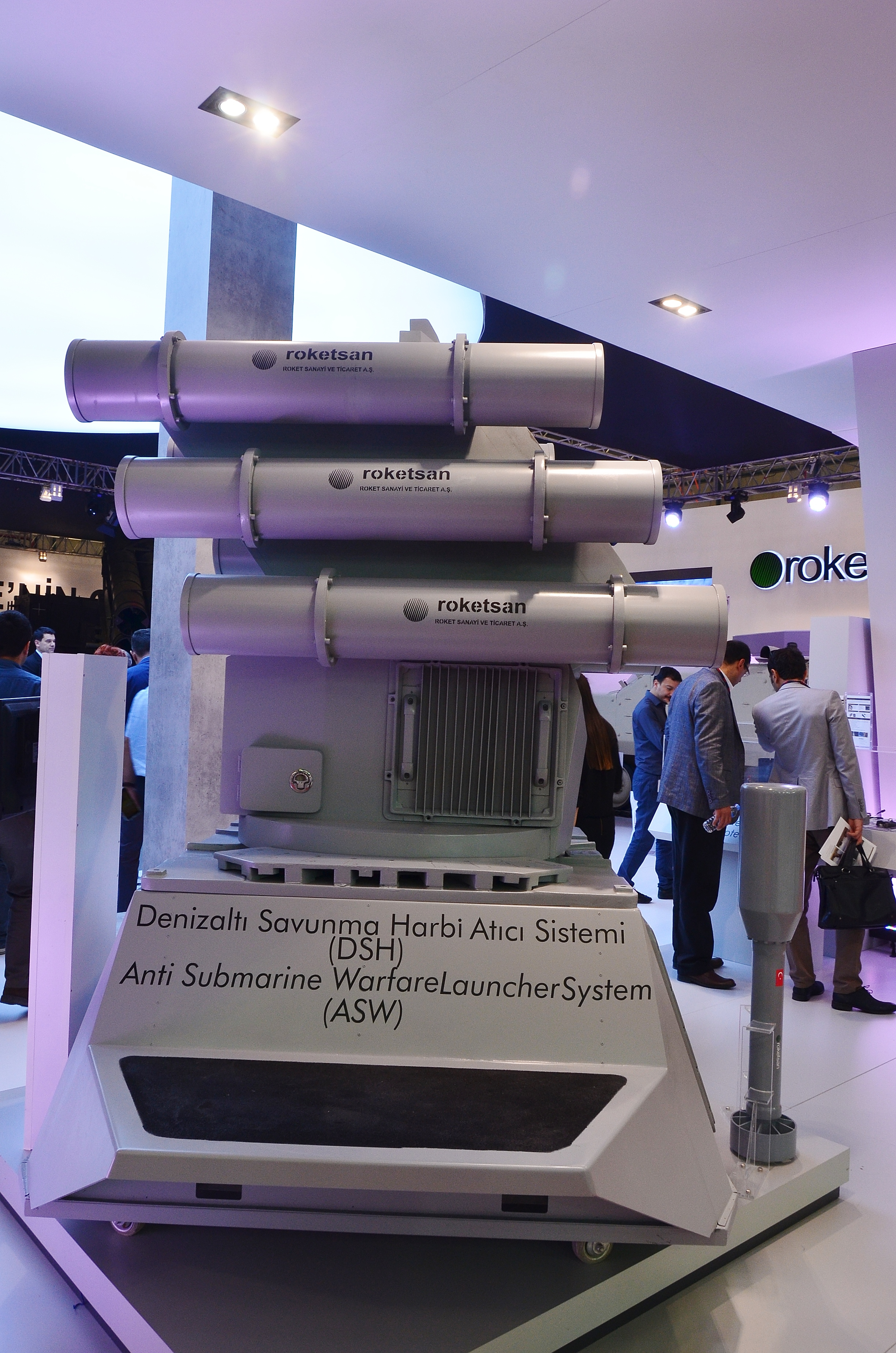
Roketsan ASW rocket launcher system

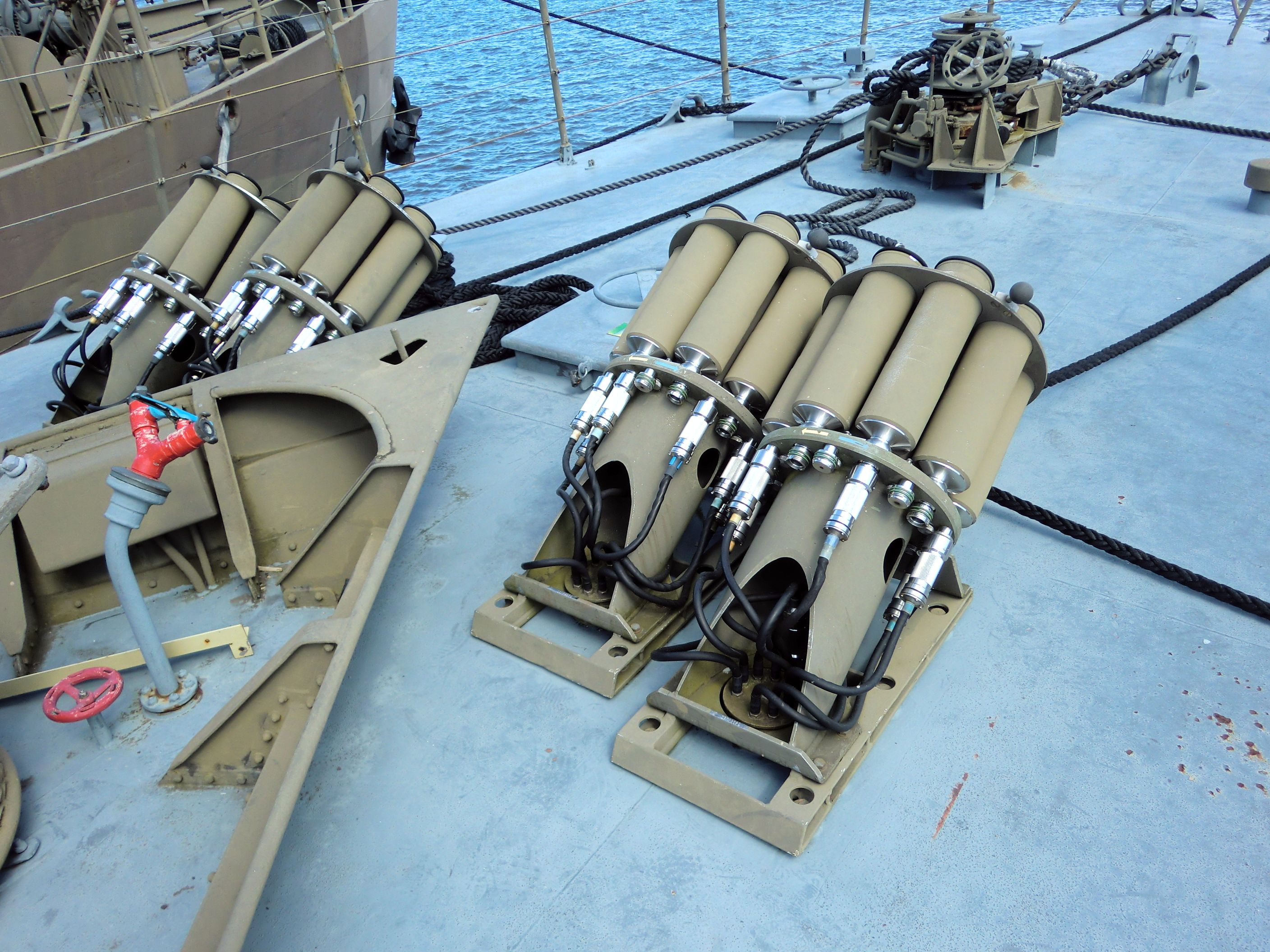
Anti-submarine system Elma ASW-600 (Elma LLS-920) on the Swedish patrol boat HMS Hugin

The Squid mortar was replaced by Limbo ( "Anti Submarine Mortar Mark 10") with range of 400 to 1,000 yards (370- 910m). Limbo was installed on ships such as the Leander-class frigates and used by Commonwealth navies until the 1990s.

After World War II several other countries developed anti-submarine rocket systems. The U.S. developed another system named RUR-4 Weapon Alpha. Norway developed the Terne. The Bofors 375 mm anti-submarine rocket was developed in the 1950s by Sweden. It had two or four barrels and fired a 550-pound (250 kg) projectile up to 3,800 yards (3,500 m). Due to the poor sonar conditions of the Baltic Sea, mortars, and rocket and missile launchers still retain a place next to torpedoes. The USSR developed its own anti-submarine rockets in the RBU series and these are still in use in Russia. China also developed multiple types of anti-submarine rocket system. In 2015, Turkish company Roketsan unveiled Roketsan ASW rocket launcher system. These systems have also been exported to multiple countries.

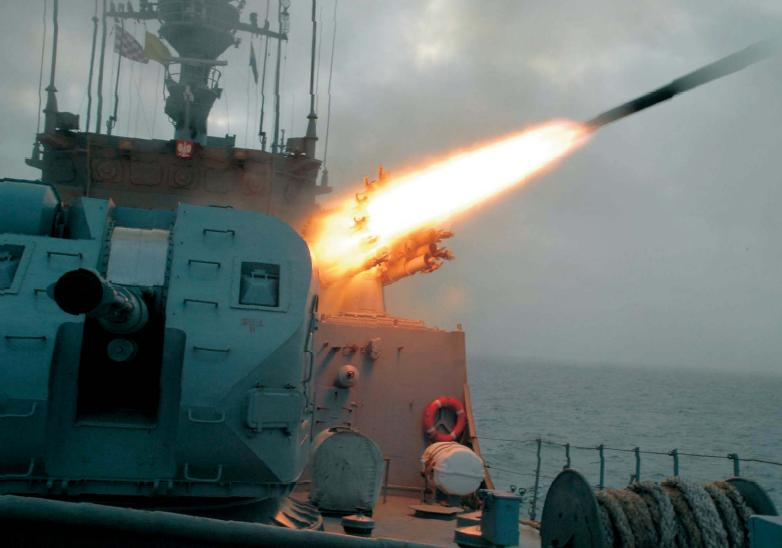
ORP Kaszub firing a RBU-6000 rocket depth charge

The homing torpedo and anti-submarine missiles have largely take the anti-submarine role, although anti-submarine rockets still used as secondary anti-submarine weapon by larger ships and primary anti-submarine weapon by small ships by several nations. Compared to the anti-submarine torpedo and missile, range of the anti-submarine rocket is short. The former Soviet Navy (and by extension, the Russian Navy) is the largest user of anti-submarine rockets. Keeping with the Soviet idea that weapons should be simple and cheap, several versions of anti-submarine rockets were developed. Trials were also conducted on destroying oncoming torpedoes with anti-submarine mortars. The most common is the RBU-6000, which fires twelve 160-pound (73 kg) projectiles in a horseshoe pattern up to 6,500 yards (5,900 m) away.

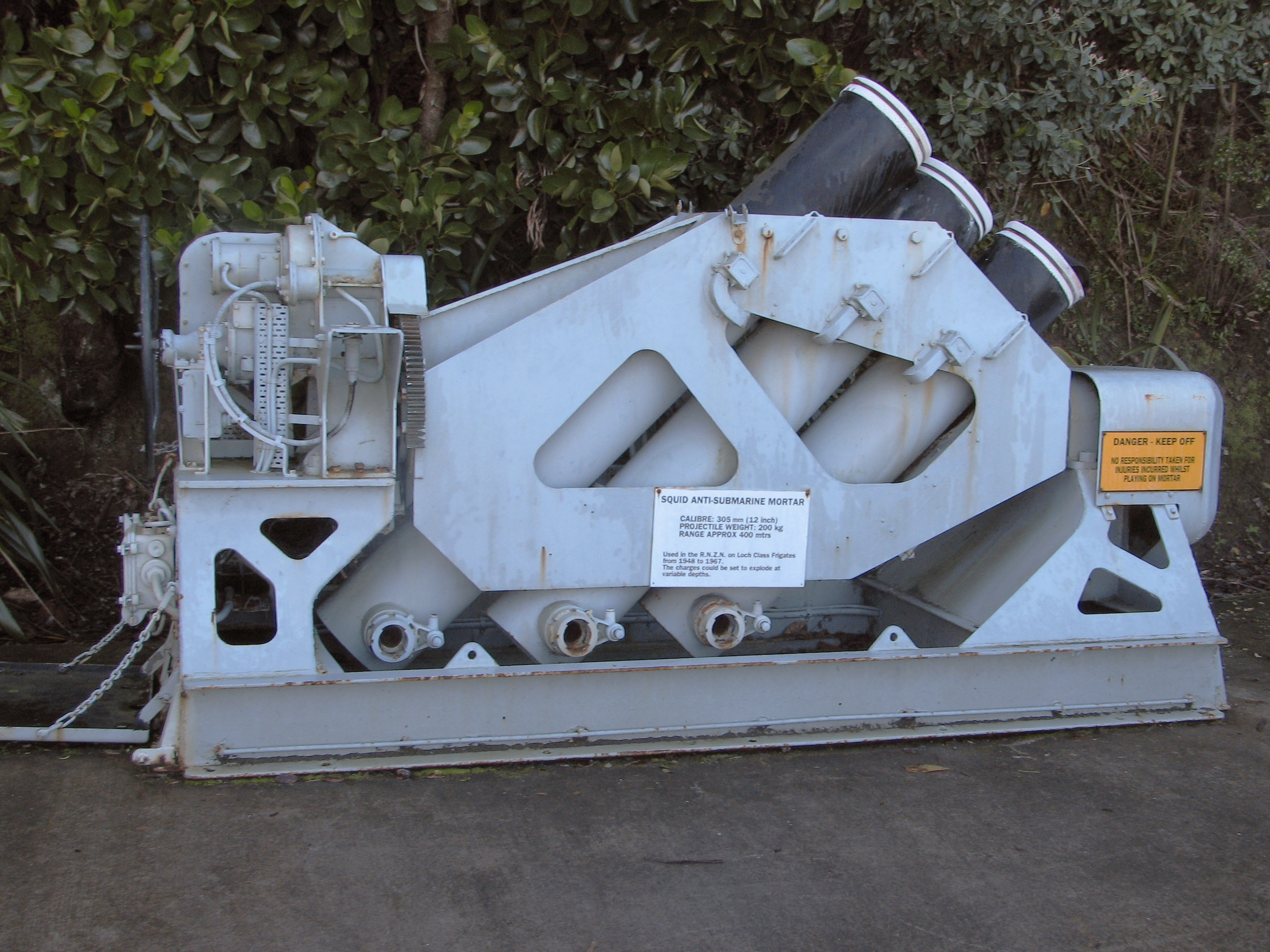
Squid anti-submarine mortar on display at the Devonport Naval Base

== List of weapons ==
=== Rockets ===
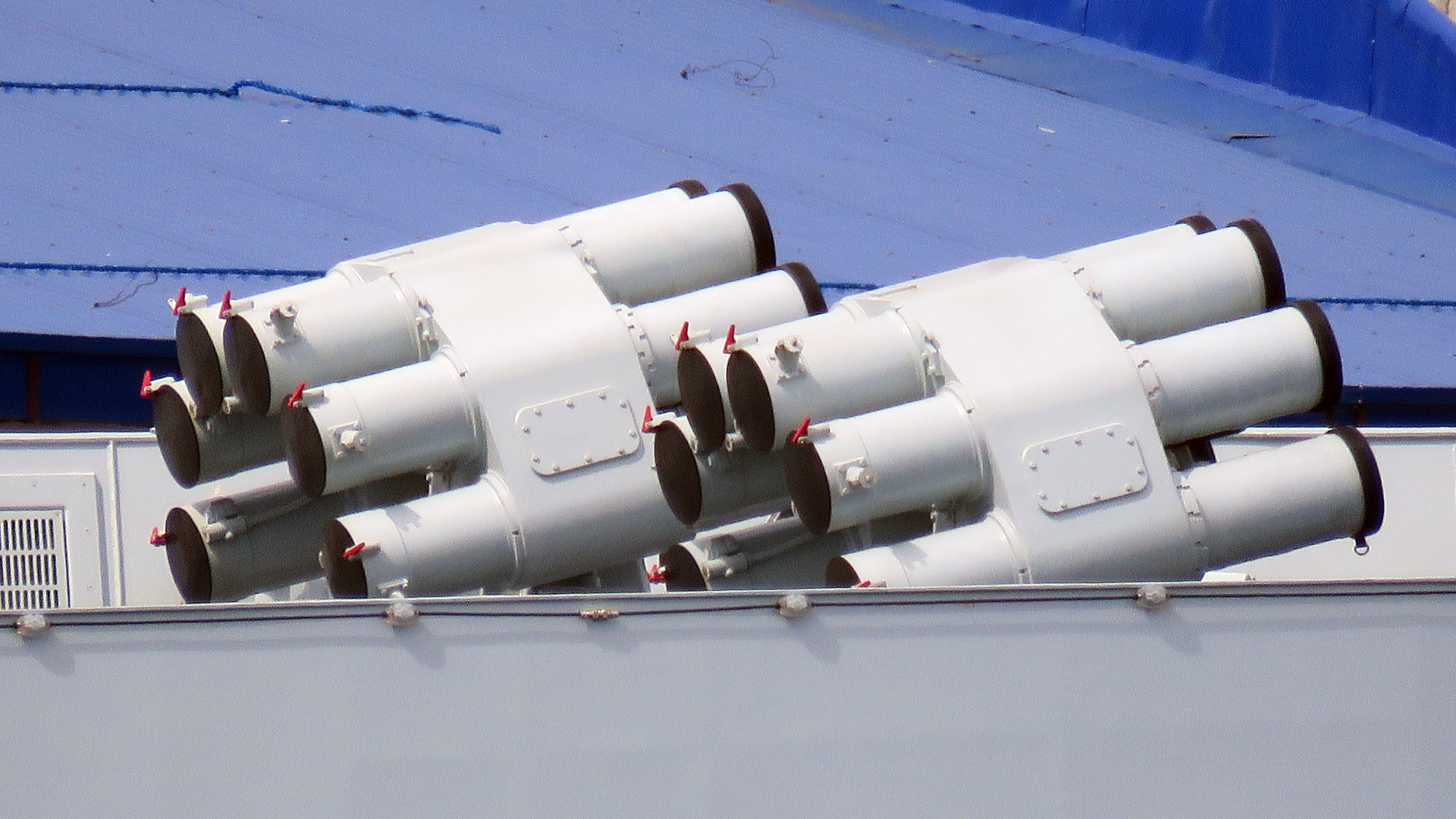
Chinese Navy Type-87 anti-submarine rocket launcher system

Sweden

- Bofors 375 mm anti-submarine rocket

United States

- Mousetrap 183 mm
- RUR-4 Weapon Alpha 324 mm

Soviet Union / Russia

- RBU-12000 "UDAV-1" 300 mm
- RBU-6000 "Smerch-2" 212 mm
- RBU-2500 "Smerch" 212 mm
- RBU-1200 "Uragan" 212 mm
- RBU-1000 "Smerch-3" 305 mm

Turkey

- Roketsan ASW rocket launcher system

Norway

- Terne

China

- FQF-1200, 5-tube RBU-1200 derivative
- "Type 75" or "FQF-2500", 12-tube RBU-1200 derivative
- Type 81 anti-submarine rocket launcher and rockets
- Type 3200 / FQF-3200 anti-submarine rocket launcher;
- Type 87 240 mm anti-submarine rocket launcher

=== Mortars ===
Italy

- Menon

Sweden

- Elma ASW-600
  - ASW-601

United Kingdom

- BL 7.5-inch naval howitzer
- Fairlie Mortar
- Hedgehog
- Limbo
- Parsnip
- Squid

Japan

- IJN
  - Type 94 depth charge projector
  - Type 3 depth charge projector
  - 15 cm ASW mortar
  - 15 cm 9-tube ASW rocket launcher (prototype)
  - 12 cm "Short Gun"
  - 20 cm "Short Gun"
  - Navy 81 mm mortar (firing standard projectiles)
- IJA (repurposed infantry mortars)
  - Type 96 and Type 97 150 mm infantry mortar
  - Type 2 12 cm mortar

United States

- Depth Charge Projectors
  - "Y-gun types" - Marks 1, 5, 7, and 8
  - "K-gun types" - Marks 6 and 9
- Single mortars
  - Mark 2
  - Marks 3 and 4 (prototypes)
- Ahead-Throwing Weapon Projectors
  - Marks 10 and 11 (adaptations of the British Hedgehog)
  - Marks 14 and 15 (evolutions of the Hedgehog)
  - Mark 16 and 17 (prototypes based on the Hedgehog, the Mark 17 intended for the Dealey class destroyer escorts)
  - Mark 20, and 21 "Mousetrap" (rocket projectors)
- Rocket Launchers:
  - Mark 108 RUR-4 Weapon Alpha
  - Mark 110 Rocket Assisted Torpedo

== Bibliography ==
- Campbell, John (1985). Naval Weapons of World War II. Annapolis, Maryland: Naval Institute Press. ISBN 0-87021-459-4.
- Lengerer, Hans (2023). The Aircraft Carriers of the Imperial Japanese Navy and Army: Technical and Operational History. Vol. II. Model Hobby. ISBN 978-83-60041-71-0.
