= Fairlie Mortar =

Anti-submarine weapon

The Fairlie Mortar was an unsuccessful British anti-submarine mortar design of the early second World War. It projected small anti-submarine bombs simultaneously, ten from each side of the ship's forecastle, each containing 20 lb (9.1 kg) of explosive. The Fairlie Mortar was not a success and 'Hedgehog', a spigot mortar projecting 24 small bombs from a platform, eventually became the predominant British ship-borne anti-submarine weapon in the war.

== Fairlie research establishment ==
The Fairlie Mortar was developed by the Royal Navy's ASDIC-research establishment at Fairlie, North Ayrshire. The research establishment had been established at Portland Harbour on the Dorset coast before the war but was dispersed northwards to escape the fighting and risk of bombing, to the Fife Boatyard in Scotland. The boatyard would provide facilities for ASDIC development and sometimes, with nearby Ardrossan, a base for the trials ship HMS Kingfisher but was not large enough to build ships as a strategic shipyard. As the research establishment was established to develop the ASDIC sensor, rather than offensive weapons, this led to conflict with HMS Vernon, the Royal Navy's shore establishment in Portsmouth. Vernon had long been the navy's torpedo school and saw itself as having responsibility for offensive weapons.

In January 1940, Fairlie was allowed a partnership with Vickers-Armstrongs to develop an anti-submarine weapon, the Fairlie Mortar, whilst Vernon collaborated with Thornycroft to develop the similar 'Five Wide Virgins', based on Thornycroft's First World War mortar. The Department of Miscellaneous Weapons Development (the Wheezers and Dodgers) were advocating the multiple spigot mortar that would become Hedgehog. Developments over the next few years were characterised by disagreements between the three groups.

== Fairlie Mortar ==
The Fairlie Mortar was developed by the civilian scientist (boffin) B. S. Smith at Fairlie. The primary purpose, unsurprisingly for Fairlie, was to avoid a disadvantage with ASDIC; the minimum range of ASDIC left a 'hole' immediately ahead of the ship where submarines could not be tracked. A U-boat skipper could wait for this hole, then manoeuvre out of the path of the approaching destroyer. Gravity-dropped depth charges were large, slow-sinking and could only be dropped directly astern. A technique developed during the First World War had been to 'throw' charges sideways, with powered launchers, such as the Thornycroft mortar. By firing enough charges, a large pattern could be fired in the hope that the target would still be somewhere within it. The charges were so heavy that few reloads could be carried and the manual reloading time was so long that any submarine would have escaped before a second salvo. By firing these mortars ahead instead and by using a smaller, streamlined and faster-sinking projectile, the hope was to destroy a target submarine before ASDIC contact had been lost.

The mortar used two racks of ten tubes, mounted on the forecastle. The tubes were in line fore-and-aft, mounted on a swinging frame. Based on their work with ASDIC, this was roll-stabilised against the ship's motion and could also be used to lay the mortar onto the ASDIC bearing. The initial Fairlie projectile was lightweight, limited by the power of the propellant charge and the strength of the deck to support the mortar. This was recognised to be too light for service use and a developed version would need to be heavier, more powerful and with a more robust mounting on the ship. A similar problem beset the Thornycroft projector which used heavy charges and was limited to only five, an inadequate pattern, if they were to be thrown far enough to still be ahead of the ship when they detonated. Fairlie's mortar bombs carried only 20 lb (9.1 kg) of explosive filling and used a lead ballast weight to keep them nose-down for faster sinking. A production bomb was expected to need around 60 lb (27 kg) of filling and to avoid the 'wasted' mass of pure ballast. They were detonated by a nose impact fuze, needing to sink near-vertical if this was to be triggered reliably.

The Fairlie Mortar was unsuccessful, as much due to politics as to technical failings. Although it may have been tested on Kingfisher, the Fairlie team's regular trials ship since their time at Portland, these trials seem to have been cut short. There was a conflict between teams: the Vernon and Thornycroft team who favoured mortars (like Fairlie) but wanted them to be very heavy and the DMWD that had no faith in any ability to aim such a weapon and so favoured quantity over quality with large numbers of small Hedgehog projectiles. Fairlie were caught between these, in an offensive field to which they were supposedly not taking part. They had faith in their ASDIC detection and the ability to aim a small number of powerful weapons close to a target but lacked political support to develop this further. The Thornycroft weapon was too heavy to be automatically controlled and Hedgehog believed it to be unnecessary. Eventually the Director of Naval Ordnance became embroiled and B. S. Smith was removed from control in 1942.

== Hedgehog ==
Hedgehog took the opposing view to Fairlie's vision: it used a large number of lightweight projectiles, and a 'scatter-gun' approach to targeting. This was much simpler to achieve; the projectiles were contact-fuzed, requiring a direct hit to explode. Even then there were concerns that the projectiles might fail seriously to damage the target, if they hit a non-critical casing or sail, rather than the pressure hull. To counteract this, their 30 lb (14 kg) TNT charge was increased to 35 lb (16 kg) of the more powerful aluminised Torpex.

There was also distrust by the crews of their Hedgehogs, after incidents like that on HMS Escapade in September 1943, when a Hedgehog misfired and killed 16 of the crew, causing extensive damage.

== Parsnip ==
Parsnip or 'Mortar A' was a response to the concerns over the small size of Hedgehog and was a revival of the Fairlie Mortar, now with two rows of ten mortar tubes, each projectile carrying a 60 lb (27 kg) charge. Parsnip's tubes were aligned to fire a circular pattern, half from each row, and were fired in pairs from each side, with a 0.1 second automatic delay between pairs firing, to reduce the recoil load on the mount. The launcher was well thought out for ease of operation and could be tilted horizontally, to allow re-loading with a simple trolley, rather than the vertical lift on davits that the Thornycroft had required, and which would have made it impossible to reload in most mid-Atlantic conditions. The propellant, at least for the trials, was a separate breech-loading cartridge, being easier to store separately from the less-sensitive but heavier projectiles, and allowing for easier trials of different propellant charges and projectile weights.

The apparatus was tested on HMS Ambuscade in February 1943. Performance was thought to be adequate but Hedgehog was already well-established and the next generation, Squid, was almost ready for its trials on Ambuscade in May. Fairlie's main work up to this time had returned to ASDIC, with the Type 144Q ASDIC in late 1942, then the Type 147. The Q attachment gave a paper recording of the target bearing, with a much narrower beam in plan view than the 144 set. The 147 set with its beamforming 'sword' transducer produced a horizontal 'fan' beam that could give a depth estimate. Both of these improved targeting for a weapon, unlike Hedgehog, capable of making use of this information.

== Squid and Limbo ==
The Fairlie Mortar's legacy was as a concept for small numbers of powerful, well-aimed weapons and as a step towards the development of Squid or 'Mortar B' and in turn Limbo, the dominant anti-submarine mortar of the Cold War period. These were one or two installations of three-barrelled forward-throwing heavy mortars. They were controlled directly by the ASDIC system, first the Type 147 sonar and tracked the target continuously. When the target was at the optimum location, they were fired automatically. They were controllable in bearing, depth and (for Limbo) range. The three mortars had a fixed relationship to each other, giving a triangular pattern around the target. The projectile was a heavy depth charge, of around 400 lb (180 kg) weight with 200 lb (91 kg) of Minol filling. They were shaped to sink quickly and predictably and had a clockwork time fuze, which was set automatically between loading and firing. This was better synchronised than a hydrostatic fuze and the charges were intended to detonate simultaneously around the target, giving a combined shock wave.

== Bibliography ==
- Brown, David K. (2007). Atlantic Escorts: Ships, Weapons & Tactics in World War II. Seaforth Publishing. ISBN 978-1-84-415702-0.
- DiGiulian, Tony (2019). "Britain ASW Weapons". navweaps.com.
- Friedman, Norman (2012). British Destroyers & Frigates: The Second World War & After. Seaforth Publishing. ISBN 978-1-84-832015-4.
- Henry, Chris (2005). Depth Charge!: Mines, Depth Charges and Underwater Weapons, 1914–1945. Casemate Publishers. ISBN 978-1-84-415174-5.
- Lavery, Brian (2012). Shield of Empire. Birlinn. ISBN 978-0-85-790542-0.
