= 53 cm/52 (21") Gerät 36 naval gun =

German prototype naval gun

53 cm/52 (21") Gerät 36
- Type: Naval gun (experimental)
- Place of origin: Germany

Service history
- In service: Never operational (test firing c. 1941)

Production history
- Designer: Krupp (attributed)
- Designed: 1938
- Manufacturer: Krupp
- No. built: Prototype

Specifications
- Mass: 329.8 t (including breech)
- Length: 27.700 m
- Barrel length: 26.040 m (bore)
- Caliber: 53.34 cm (21 in)
- Action: Horizontal sliding breech block
- Rate of fire: <1 round per minute (estimated)
- Muzzle velocity: 820 m/s (APC/HE), 1,040 m/s (light HE)
- Maximum firing range: 47,500 m (standard), 65,000 m (light HE)
- Feed system: Separate loading bagged charges

The 53 cm/52 (21") Gerät 36 was a German experimental naval gun developed in 1938 for the Kriegsmarine. It is considered one of the largest artillery pieces ever constructed. Although test firings were reportedly conducted on a prototype gun and cradle, the weapon was never completed for operational service.

== Design and development ==
The Gerät 36 was ordered in 1938 during a period of German naval rearmament. It was developed as part of experimental studies into ultra-heavy naval artillery. The project remained at prototype stage and was never integrated into any operational warship design.

The weapon employed a built-up barrel construction consisting of four layers: a shrunk loose liner, an A tube, and two outer reinforcing tube layers. It used a horizontal sliding breech block, consistent with other Krupp artillery systems.

== Description ==
The gun had a bore diameter of 53.34 cm (21 in). The prototype gun and cradle were reportedly fired on several occasions, although the proof mounting was never fully completed. It is considered unlikely that the weapon was intended for operational deployment, as even the projected H-class battleship design (H-44) was planned to carry 50.8 cm guns.

== Specifications ==
The Gerät 36 had the following technical characteristics:

- Gun weight: 329.8 tonnes (including breech)
- Overall length: 27.700 m
- Bore length: 26.040 m
- Rifling length: 21.417 m
- Number of grooves: 110
- Chamber volume: 1,250 dm³
- Working pressure: 3,000 kg/cm^{2}
- Rate of fire: less than one round per minute (estimated)

== Ammunition ==
The weapon was designed to fire separate-loading bagged charges with multiple projectile types:

- Armour-piercing capped (APC L/4.9): 2,200 kg projectile
- High-explosive (HE L/4.9): 2,200 kg projectile
- Coastal light HE: 1,400 kg projectile

Propellant charges reached up to 1,457 kg in total depending on configuration.

== Performance ==
- Muzzle velocity: 820 m/s (APC/HE), 1,040 m/s (light HE)
- Maximum range: 47,500 m (standard projectiles), up to 65,000 m (light HE at 50° elevation)

== Fate ==
The Gerät 36 project was abandoned before entering service. Its cancellation was likely due to the impracticality of ultra-heavy naval artillery and changing strategic requirements during the Second World War.

== See also ==
- List of naval guns by caliber
