= BL 7.5-inch naval howitzer =

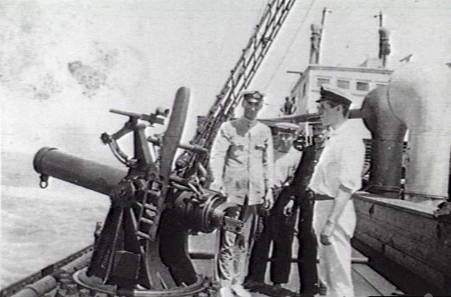
- On SS Boonah
- Type: Anti-submarine mortar
- Place of origin: United Kingdom

Service history
- In service: 1917–192?
- Used by: British Empire
- Wars: World War I

Specifications
- Mass: Gun & breech 812 pounds (368 kg)
- Barrel length: Bore 63.75 inches (1.619 m)
- Shell: HE 100 pounds (45.4 kg)
- Calibre: 7.5-inch (191 mm)
- Breech: single-motion interrupted screw
- Muzzle velocity: 480 feet per second (146 m/s)
- Maximum firing range: 2,100 yards (1,920 m)
- Filling: TNT
- Filling weight: 43 pounds (19.5 kg)

The BL 7.5-inch howitzer (naval) was a British anti-submarine mortar developed during World War I.

== History ==
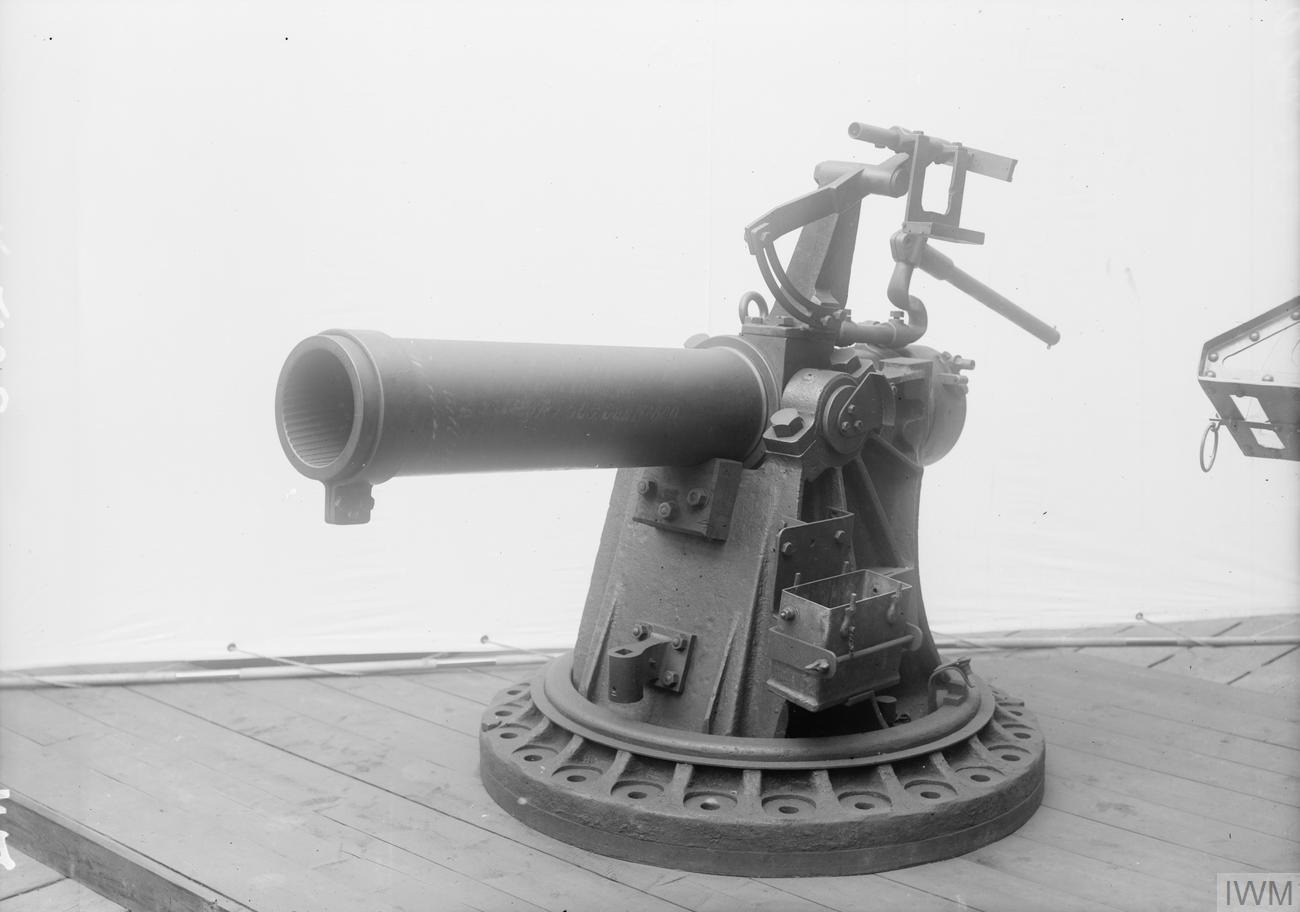
7.5-inch howitzer used on HMS Vindictive during the Zeebrugge Raid

The weapon was developed together with other similar devices early in 1917 and went into service in June 1917 in response to German unrestricted submarine warfare. It was mounted on merchant ships and patrol vessels. By 10 December that year, 377 were in service.

The shell was fired at the submarine either on the surface or submerged - hence it had attributes of both armour-piercing shell and depth charge. It was designed to first penetrate the submarine's outer hull without breaking up, and then detonate against the inner hull after a 2-second delay, destroying the submarine. However the small weight of the shell limited its effectiveness, and the anti-submarine mortar did not become a truly successful weapon until the advent of the multiple-projectile Hedgehog during World War II.

Nonetheless Admiral John Jellicoe, writing a few years after the gun had gone into service, commented: "This weapon, although not very popular at first, soon, however, proved its value, when employed both from patrol craft and from merchant ships."

Two were mounted on HMS Vindictive and used to bombard German defences during her participation in the Zeebrugge raid of 23 April 1918.

== Similar weapons ==
- 12 cm/12 short naval gun—A Japanese anti-submarine gun used during World War II.
- 20 cm/12 short naval gun—A Japanese anti-submarine gun used during the latter half of World War II.
- 8-inch Mark 7 & Mark 8—Two American anti-submarine guns designed late in World War I that never entered service.

== General and cited references ==
- I. V. Hogg & L.F. Thurston, British Artillery Weapons & Ammunition 1914–1918. London: Ian Allan, 1972
- Admiral John Jellicoe, The Crisis of the Naval War, published 1920
