= Type 2 12 cm mortar =

Japanese Type 2 12 cm mortar
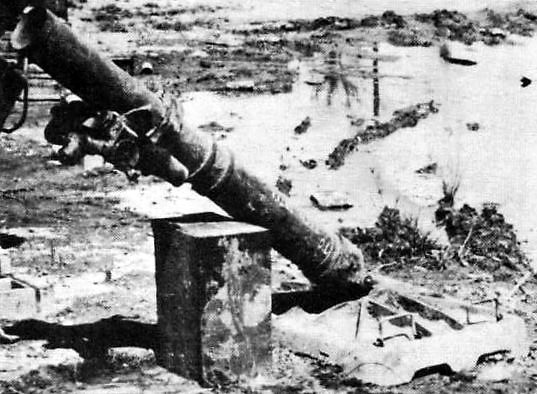
- A captured Type 2 mortar missing its bipod.
- Place of origin: Empire of Japan

Service history
- Used by: Imperial Japanese Army
- Wars: World War II

Production history
- Produced: 1943-1945
- No. built: 695

Specifications
- Mass: 260 kg (573.20 lb)
- Length: 1.535 m (5 ft 0.4 in)
- Barrel length: 1.36 m (4 ft 6 in)
- Caliber: 120 mm (4.72 in)
- Action: Manual
- Elevation: +45° to +80°
- Muzzle velocity: 239 m/s (780 ft/s)
- Effective firing range: 4,200 m (4,600 yd)

The Type 2 12 cm mortar is a smooth bore, muzzle-loading type mortar which, except for the firing mechanism, closely resembles the conventional Stokes-Brandt 81 mm (3.2 in) mortar. The Type 2 120 mm (4.7 in) mortar was the final standardized armament for Japanese trench mortar battalions, effectively replacing less powerful 90 mm (3.5 in) trench mortars and heavier 150 mm (5.9 in) trench mortars.

Only one type of ammunition was produced, the Type 2 HE round, which had more than twice the explosive fill of Japanese 90 mm (3.5 in) rounds. The Type 2 120 mm (4.7 in) mortar was considered an effective and modern design by the Imperial Japanese Army; however, it only saw wide-scale dissemination during the last of the year.

Japanese 90 mm (3.5 in), 120 mm (4.7 in), and 150 mm (5.9 in) mortars were labeled as "trench mortars" and were effectively controlled by Imperial Japanese Army artillery units instead of infantry units. Initially Japanese trench mortars where primarily developed as chemical-delivery weapons, but would mainly see service in conventional roles during the Greater East Asia War.

== Design ==
The mortar examined was manufactured at Osaka Arsenal in 1943. This mortar is described by the Japanese as having an overall length of 152.1 centimetres (4 ft 11.9 in), and a bore length of 136.1 centimetres (4 ft 5.6 in). The total weight of the weapon is reported to be 248.8 kg (549 lb), of which 80 kg (180 lb) represent the weight of the tube, 45 kg (99 lb) the bipod, and 94.3 kg (208 lb) the base plate. The weapon allegedly can be fired by dropping the shell down the tube to strike a fixed firing pin, or it can be trigger fired. Elevation of the piece, accomplished by adjustment of the bipod legs, ranges from 800 to 1,422 mils; traverse, at a 45-degree elevation, is 180 mils and at 70 degrees 210 mils. Maximum range of the piece is reported to be 4,500 metres (4,900 yd).

The base plate is very heavy and is fitted with four carrying handles. The sight bracket fits the standard mortar sight. The barrel is heavily reinforced at the muzzle and has two raised ribs midway of the barrel, between which the barrel clamping collar is held. The firing mechanism is similar to that used on the Type 99, 81 mm short mortar. After the weapon has been loaded, a plunger, which projects upward from the mortar breech, is struck with a mallet or similar instrument, thus camming out the firing pin and firing the mortar. A safety lock is fitted on this firing plunger.

== Ammunition ==
The ammunition is of the conventional streamlined, fin-stabilized type. It uses the ignition cartridge and powder-increment type of propellant. The round uses the standard type 100 mortar fuze and weighs 12 kg (26 lb). Two rounds of ammunition are packed in a wooden box, lined with asphalt impregnated paper. The ignition cartridges are assembled into the rounds as packed, the fuzes are packed in tear-top cans, and the doughnut-type increments are packed in tar-paper bags.
