= 20 cm/12 short naval gun =

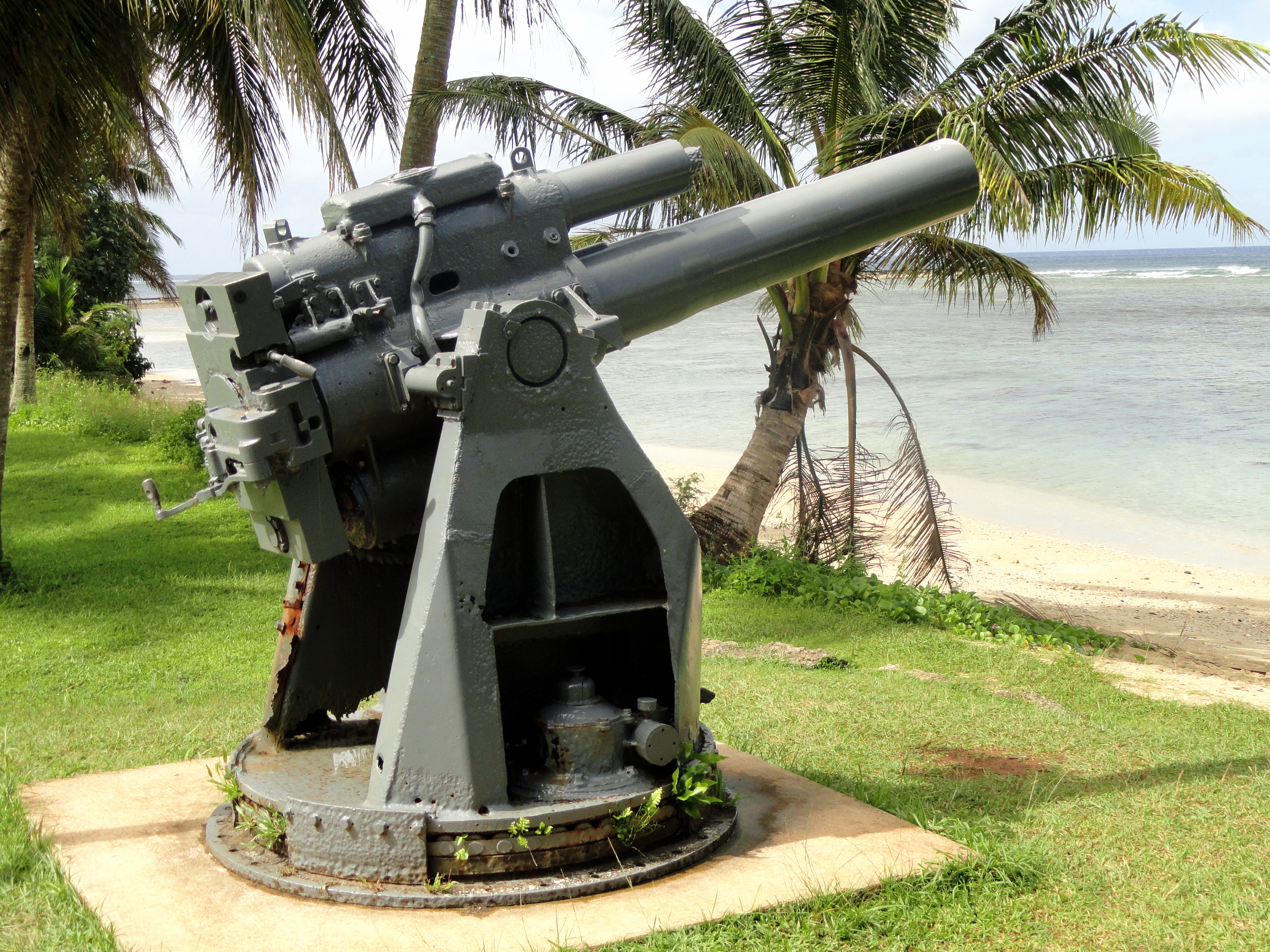
- A 20 cm/12 short naval gun at the War in the Pacific National Historical Park (Ga'an Point), Agat, Guam, USA.
- Type: Naval gun Coastal artillery Anti-aircraft gun Anti-submarine gun
- Place of origin: Empire of Japan

Service history
- In service: 1943–1945
- Used by: Imperial Japanese Navy
- Wars: World War II

Production history
- Designer: Kure Naval Arsenal
- Manufacturer: Kure Naval Arsenal
- Produced: 1943
- No. built: 250

Specifications
- Mass: Total: 4,000 kg (8,800 lb); Barrel: 630 kg (1,390 lb)
- Barrel length: 2.43 m (8 ft) L/12
- Shell: Separate loading cased charges and projectile
- Shell weight: 47–55 kg (103–122 lb)
- Caliber: 203 mm (8 in)
- Action: Manual
- Breech: Interrupted screw
- Recoil: Hydro-spring
- Carriage: Center pivot H/A L/A
- Elevation: -15° to +75°
- Traverse: 360°
- Rate of fire: 5 rounds per minute
- Muzzle velocity: 305 m/s (1,000 ft/s)
- Effective firing range: 3,300 m (10,800 ft) at 75° AA
- Maximum firing range: 6,300 m (20,700 ft) Horizontal

The 20 cm/12 short naval gun was a naval gun used by the Imperial Japanese Navy to defend merchant ships and land bases during World War II.

== History ==
Since Japan is an island nation with relatively few resources it relied upon a large merchant fleet to import the resources needed for its industry and economy. As Japanese shipping losses mounted during the latter half of World War II the Japanese began to organize their shipping into escorted convoys and they began arming their merchant ships to defend against attacks from Allied surface combatants, submarines and carrier-based aircraft. The 20 cm/12 short naval gun was a multi-purpose gun introduced during 1943 which combined the roles of naval gun, anti-aircraft gun, coastal defense gun, and anti-submarine gun.

== Design ==
The 20 cm/12 short naval gun was an autofretted monoblock gun with an interrupted screw breech that fired separate loading cased charges and projectiles. The trunnioned gun barrel had a hydro-spring recoil mechanism above and below the barrel and was mounted on a center pivot H/A L/A gun mount. The gun was normally mounted on merchant ships above 5,000 GRT and its large projectile would have been capable of destroying an enemy submarine making a surface attack.

The gun also saw use on land as a coastal defense gun on hills overlooking Japanese harbors and installations or as an anti-aircraft gun. In the anti-aircraft role, a group of four guns shared a central range and height finder for barrage fire against level bombers. It was described as heavy and its 8° a second elevation/traverse was considered slow so its ability to track small fast moving targets such as dive bombers, torpedo bombers, and fighters was probably limited. It is credited with being able to fire five rounds per minute but that is probably optimistic because the projectiles were heavy and the gun needed to be loaded at +10° between shots.

== Ammunition ==
The projectiles were propelled by a 2 kg (4 lb 7 oz) bagged charge inside a separate loading brass or steel cartridge case. In addition to the types listed below there may have been anti-submarine, armor-piercing, illumination, and incendiary ammunition.

Type	Length	Weight	Explosive weight	Explosive
Anti-Aircraft	56 cm (1 ft 10 in)	55 kg (122 lb)	?	Trinitroanisole
High Explosive	56 cm (1 ft 10 in)	50 kg (111 lb)	12.9 kg (28 lb 8 oz)	Trinitroanisole
Incendiary-Shrapnel	56 cm (1 ft 10 in)	47 kg (103 lb)	14 kg (30 lb)	?

== Similar weapons ==
- 12 cm/12 short naval gun - A similar Japanese anti-submarine gun which fired fixed QF ammunition.
- BL 7.5-inch naval howitzer - A British anti-submarine gun used during the latter half of World War I.
- 8 inch Mark 7 & Mark 8 - Two American anti-submarine guns designed late in World War I that never entered service.

== Gallery ==
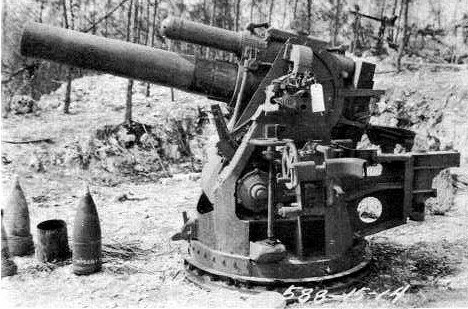
A captured 20 cm short gun with its ammunition.

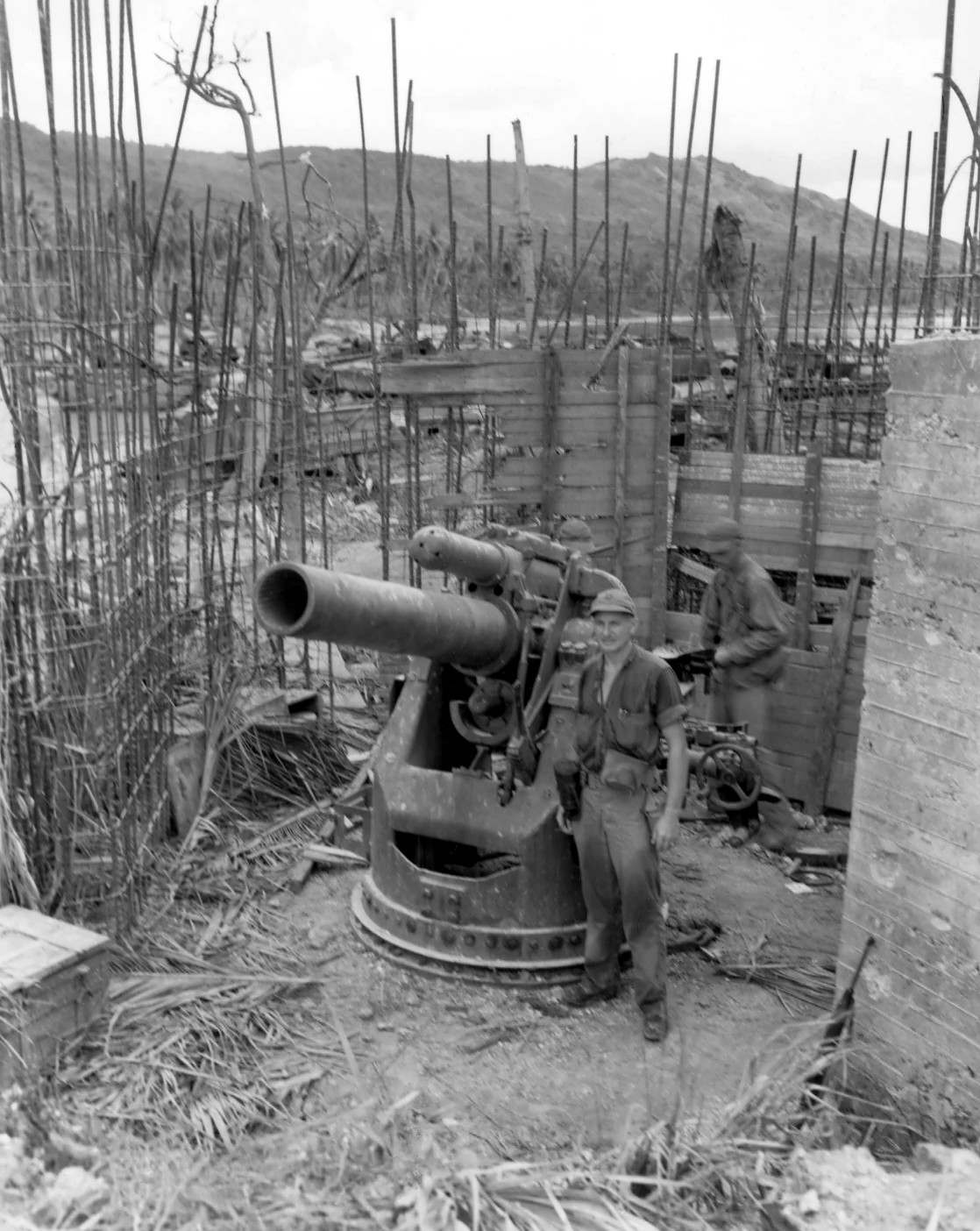
Two 20 cm short guns captured on Guam.

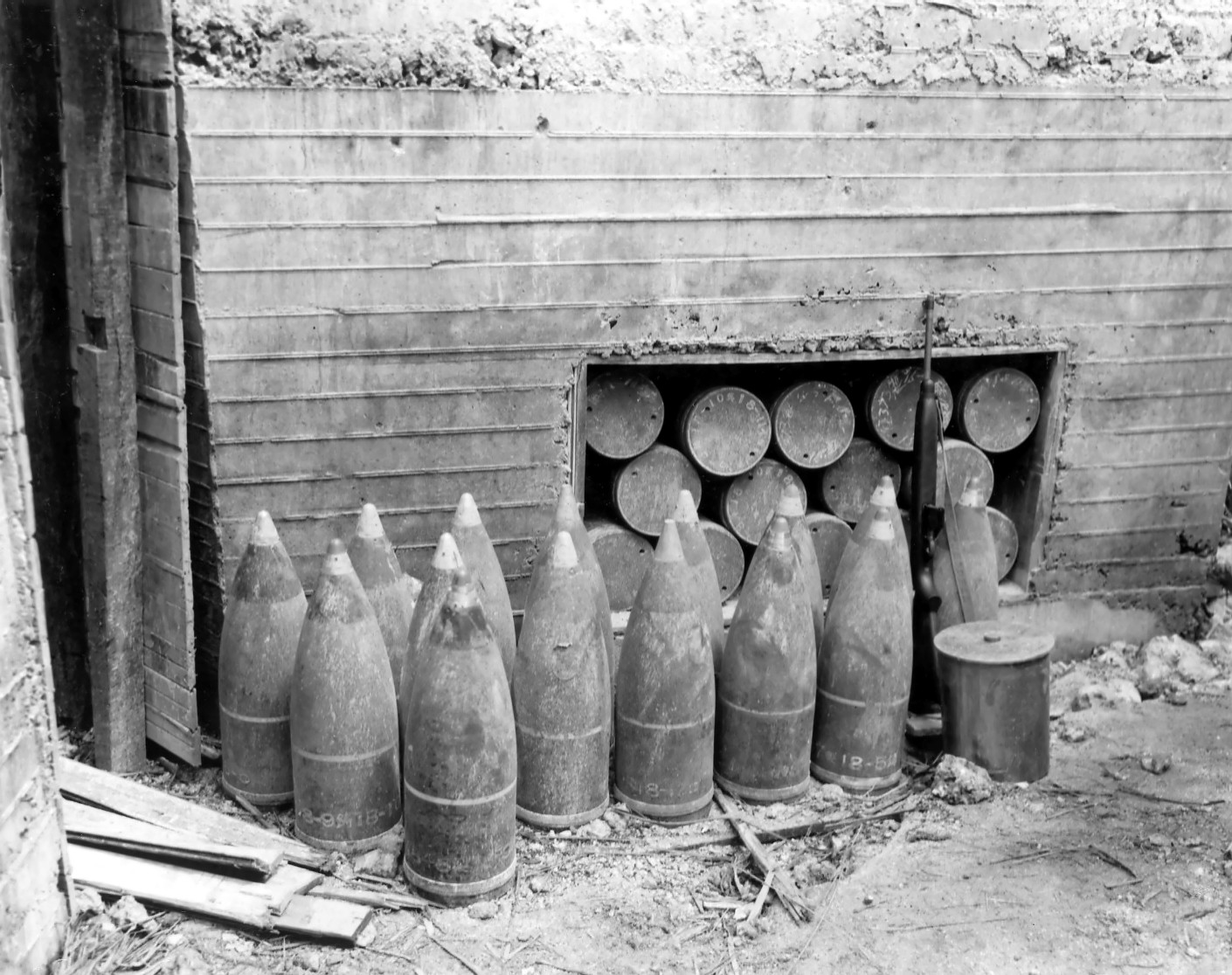
A captured ammunition bunker with 20 cm projectiles and shell cases on Guam.

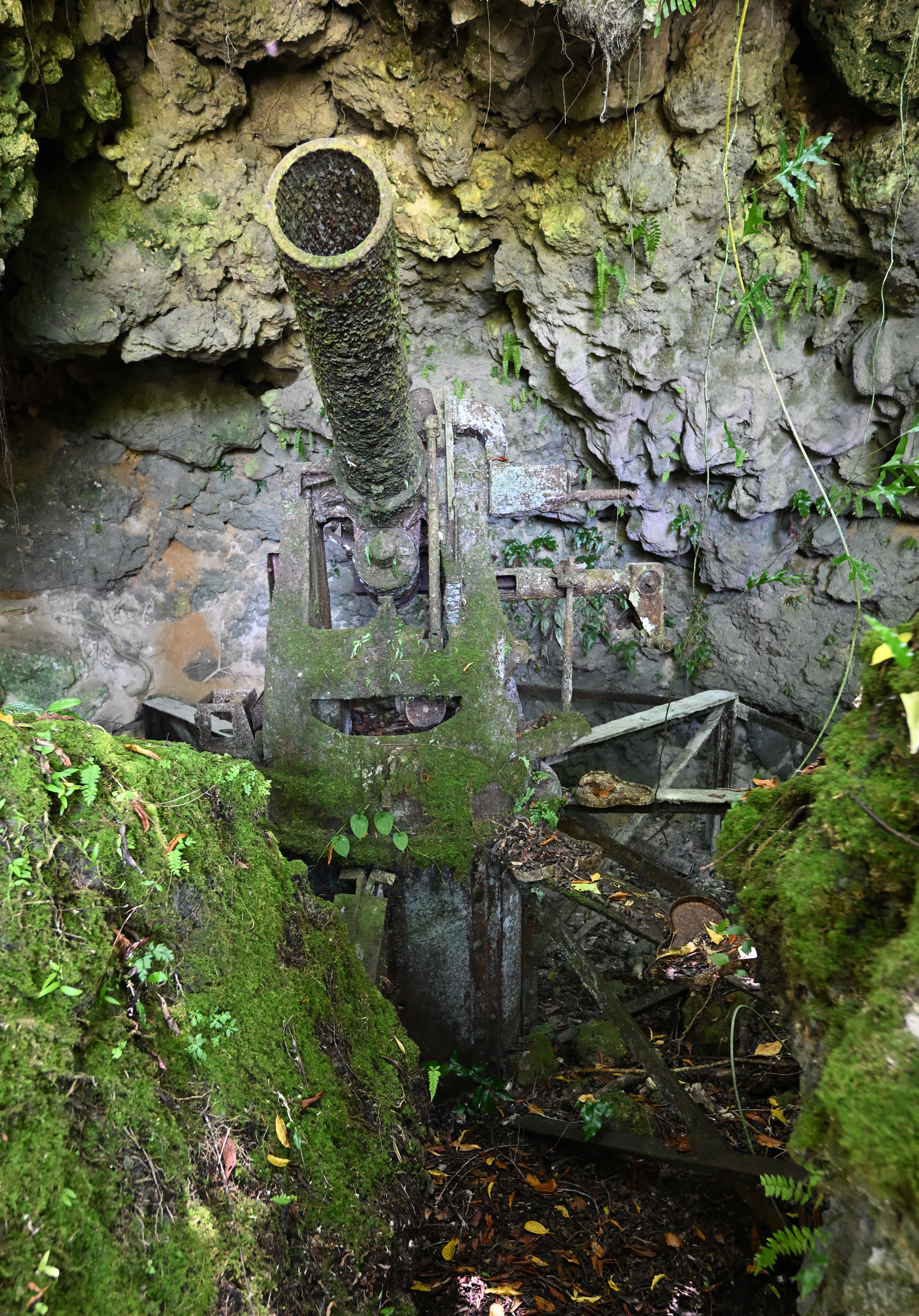
An abandoned 20 cm short gun at a cave in Peleliu Island, Palau.

== Bibliography ==
- Campbell, John (1985). Naval Weapons of World War Two. Annapolis, Maryland: Naval Institute Press. ISBN 0-87021-459-4.
