= 12 cm/12 short naval gun =

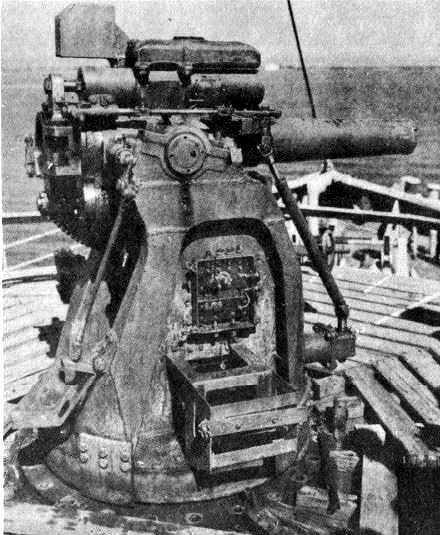
- Type: Naval gun (Note: Mainly used as an anti-submarine gun, but also as coastal artillery and anti-aircraft gun.)
- Place of origin: Empire of Japan

Service history
- In service: 1941–1945
- Used by: Imperial Japanese Army; Imperial Japanese Navy
- Wars: World War II

Production history
- Designer: Kure Naval Arsenal
- Designed: 1941
- Manufacturer: Yokosuka Naval Arsenal
- No. built: 550

Specifications
- Mass: Total: 1,890 kg (4,170 lb); Barrel: 218 kg (481 lb)
- Length: 1.5 m (4 ft 11 in)
- Barrel length: 1.4 m (4 ft 7 in) L/12
- Shell: Fixed QF 120×284mmR
- Shell weight: 13 kg (28 lb 10 oz)
- Caliber: 120 mm (4.7 in)
- Action: Manual
- Breech: Interrupted screw
- Recoil: Hydro-spring
- Carriage: Center pivot H/A L/A
- Elevation: -15° / +75°
- Traverse: 360°
- Rate of fire: 8 rounds/min
- Muzzle velocity: 290 m/s (950 ft/s)
- Effective firing range: 2,800 m (9,200 ft) at +75° AA
- Maximum firing range: 5.3 km (3.3 mi) Horizontal

The 12 cm/12 short naval gun was a naval gun used by the Imperial Japanese Navy to defend merchant ships and land bases during World War II.

== History ==
Since Japan is an island nation with relatively few resources it relied upon a large merchant fleet to import the resources needed for its industry and economy. As Japanese shipping losses mounted during World War II the Japanese began to organize their shipping into escorted convoys and they began arming their merchant ships to defend against attacks from Allied surface combatants, submarines and carrier-based aircraft. The 12cm/12 short naval gun was a multi-purpose gun introduced during 1941 which combined the roles of naval gun, anti-aircraft gun, coastal defense gun, and anti-submarine gun.

== Design ==
The 12 cm/12 short naval gun was an autofretted monobloc gun with an interrupted screw breech that fired fixed QF ammunition. The trunnioned gun barrel had a hydro-spring recoil mechanism above and below the barrel and was mounted on a center pivot HA/LA gun mount. The gun was normally mounted on merchant ships below 5,000 GRT and also saw use on land as a coastal defense gun on hills overlooking Japanese harbors and installations or as an anti-aircraft gun. It was described as being a light and easy to handle hand trained weapon that could be loaded at any angle by inexperienced gun crews. However, its rate of elevation/traverse 13° a second was considered too slow for effective anti-aircraft use.

== Ammunition ==
- Anti-aircraft
- Anti-submarine
- High explosive - Length: 13 in (33 cm), Weight: 13 kg (28 lb 10 oz), Explosive weight: 2.5 kg (5 lb 8 oz), Explosive: TNA.
- Illumination
- Incendiary
- Shrapnel

== Similar weapons ==
- 20 cm/12 short naval gun — A similar Japanese anti-submarine gun used during the latter half of World War II.
- BL 7.5-inch naval howitzer — A British anti-submarine gun used during the latter half of World War I.
- 8 inch Mark 7 & Mark 8 — Two American anti-submarine guns designed late in World War I that never entered service.
