= List of cruisers of Spain =

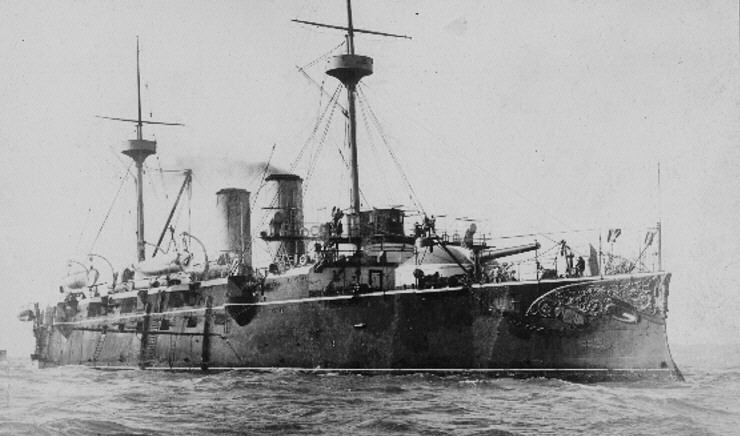
Vizcaya

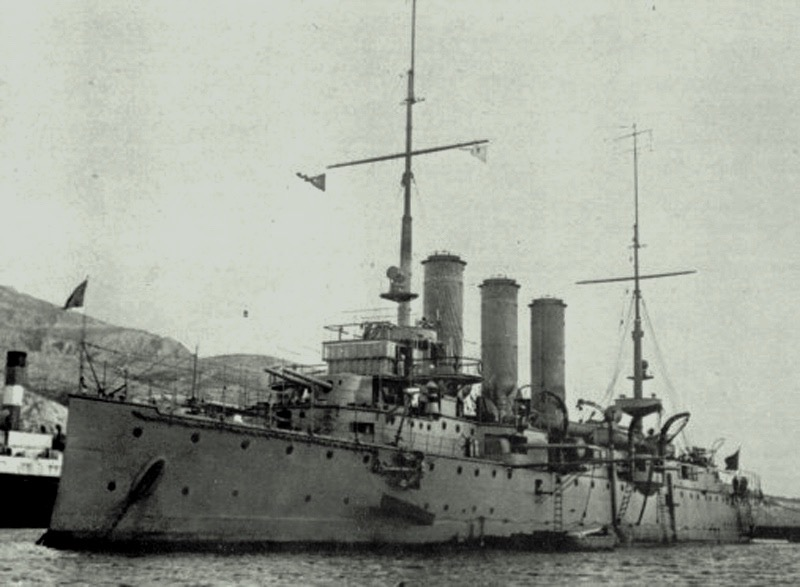
Reina Regente

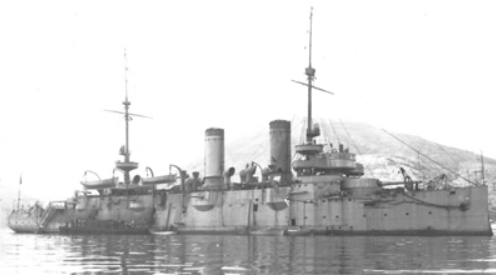
Princesa de Asturias

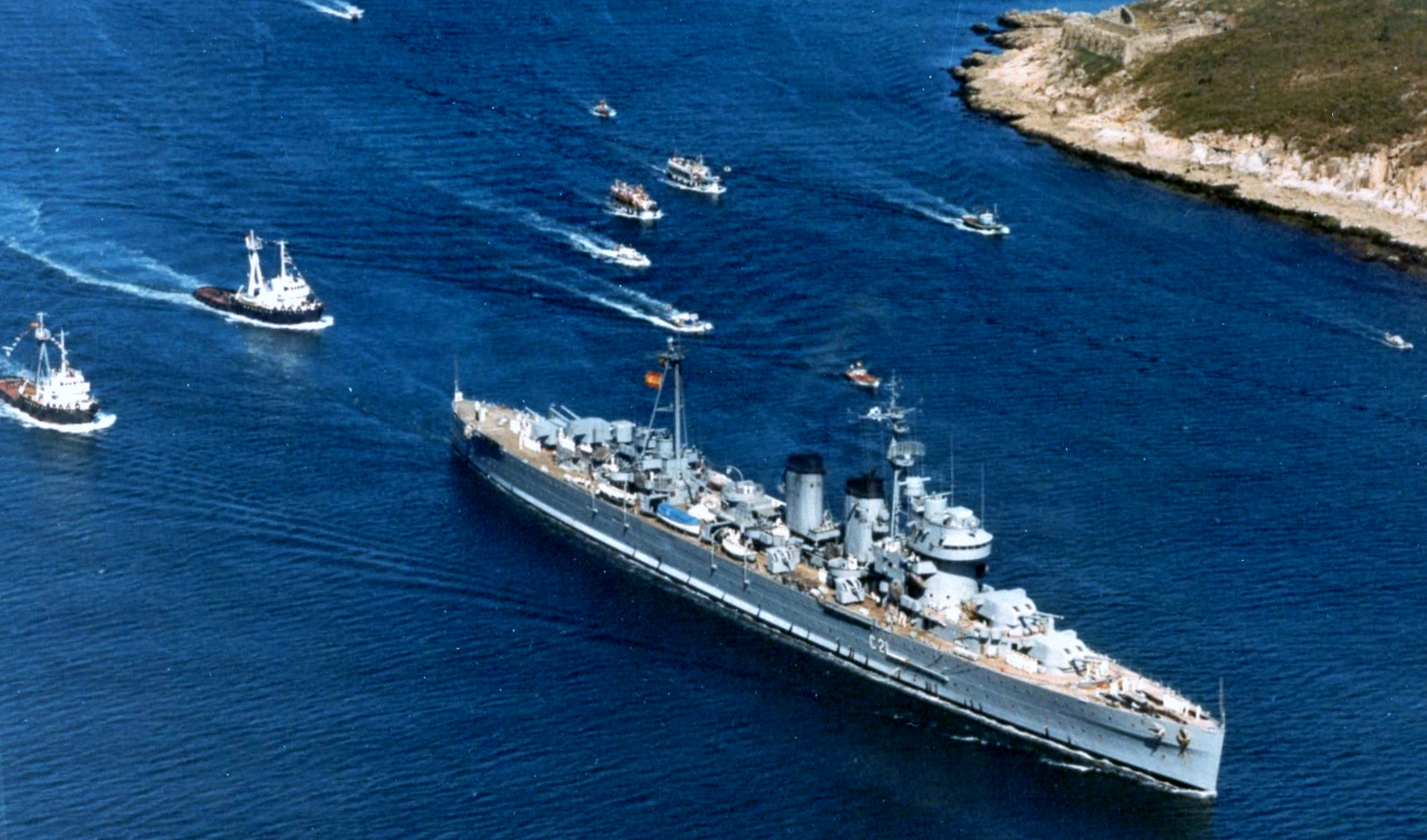
Canarias

== Unprotected cruisers ==
- Aragon class
  - Aragón (1879) - Hulked 1896
  - Navarra (1881) - Either hulked 1896 or became cadet training ship 1900 (sources differ)
  - Castilla (1881) - Sunk at the Battle of Manila Bay, 1898
- Alfonso XII class
  - Alfonso XII (1887) - Sold 1907
  - Reina Cristina (1887) - Sunk at the Battle of Manila Bay, 1898
  - Reina Mercedes (1887) - Scuttled 1898; salvaged by United States Navy; became USS Reina Mercedes (IX-25)
- Velasco class
  - Velasco (1881) - Sunk at the Battle of Manila Bay 1898
  - Gravina (1881) - Sank 1885
  - Infanta Isabel (1885) - Stricken c. 1927
  - Isabel II (1886) - Stricken c. 1905
  - Cristóbal Colón (1887) - Sank 1895
  - Don Juan de Austria (1887) - Sunk at the Battle of Manila Bay, 1898, refloated
  - Don Antonio de Ulloa (1887) - Sunk at the Battle of Manila Bay, 1898
  - Conde del Venadito (1888) - Stricken c. 1905

== Protected cruisers ==
- Isla de Luzón class
  - Isla de Luzón (1886) - Captured by the United States at the Battle of Manila Bay, 1898; became USS Isla de Luzon (1886)
  - Isla de Cuba (1886) - Captured by the United States at the Battle of Manila Bay, 1898; became USS Isla de Cuba (1886)
  - Marques de la Ensenada (1890)
- Reina Regente class
  - Reina Regente (1887) - Sank 1895
  - Alfonso XIII (1891) - Scrapped early 1900s
  - Lepanto (1893)
- Río de la Plata (1898) — Based on the French D'Entrecasteaux but larger at 422 feet (129 m) long.
- Extremadura (1900)
- Reina Regente (1906)

== Armoured cruisers ==
- Infanta Maria Teresa class
  - Infanta Maria Teresa (1890) - Sunk at the Battle of Santiago de Cuba, 1898
  - Vizcaya (1891) - Sunk at the Battle of Santiago de Cuba 1898
  - Almirante Oquendo (1891) - Sunk at the Battle of Santiago de Cuba, 1898
- Emperador Carlos V (1895)
- Italian Giuseppe Garibaldi class
  - Cristóbal Colón (1897) - Sunk at the Battle of Santiago de Cuba, 1898
- Princesa de Asturias class
  - Princesa de Asturias (1896)
  - Cardenal Cisneros (1897) - Wrecked 1905
  - Cataluña (1900)

== Light and scout cruisers ==
- Navarra (ex-Republica, ex-Reina Victoria Eugenia) (1923)
- Blas de Lezo class
  - Blas de Lezo (1925) - Sank 1932
  - Méndez Núñez (1924) - converted to an anti-aircraft cruiser
- Almirante Cervera class
  - Almirante Cervera (1928)
  - Galicia (ex-Libertad, ex-Principe Alfonso) (1927)
  - Miguel de Cervantes (1930)

== Heavy cruisers ==
- Canarias class
  - Canarias (1936)
  - Baleares (1936) - Sunk at the Battle of Cape Palos, 1938
