= Spanish cruiser Cristóbal Colón (1887) =

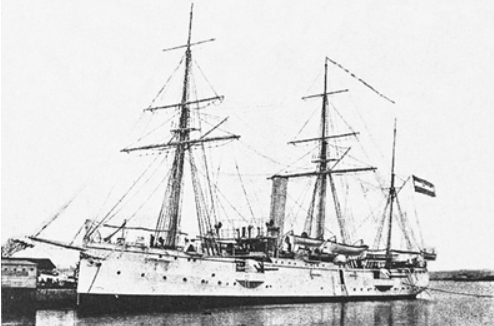

History

Spain
- Name: Cristóbal Colón
- Namesake: Christopher Columbus (1451–1506), Genoese explorer for Spain
- Builder: Arsenal de La Carraca, San Fernando, Spain
- Laid down: 13 June 1884
- Launched: 23 January 1887
- Completed: 1889
- Fate: Wrecked 29 September 1895

General characteristics
- Class & type: Velasco-class unprotected cruiser
- Displacement: 1,152 tons
- Length: 64.01 m (210 ft 0 in)
- Beam: 9.75 m (32 ft 0 in)
- Height: 5.33 m (17 ft 6 in)
- Draft: 4.17 m (13 ft 8 in) maximum
- Depth: 3.86 m (12 ft 8 in)
- Installed power: 1,500 ihp (1,119 kW)
- Propulsion: Horizontal compound steam engine, 4-cylinder boilers, one shaft, 200 to 220 tons coal (normal)
- Sail plan: Barque-rigged; 1,132 m^{2} (12,185 sq ft) of sail (as built); 823 m^{2} (8,859 sq ft) of sail (later)
- Speed: 13 knots (24 km/h; 15 mph); made 15 knots (28 km/h; 17 mph) on sea trials
- Complement: 173 officers and enlisted men
- Armament: 4 × 4.7-inch (120 mm) guns; 2 × 6 pounder guns; 1 × machine gun; 2 × 14 in (356 mm) torpedo tubes

Cristóbal Colón was a Velasco-class unprotected cruiser of the Spanish Navy. She was commissioned in 1889 saw mostly colonial service before her loss in 1895.

== Characteristics and construction ==
Cristóbal Colón was an iron-hulled unprotected cruiser designed for colonial service in the Spanish Empire. She was barque-rigged, with three masts and a bowsprit, and she had one rather tall funnel. She was one of the Infanta Isabel series of ships of her class, six ships built in Spain which were an improved version of the first two ships, Velasco and Gravina, both built in the United Kingdom. The ships of the Infanta Isabel series were slightly faster than and had a different armament from the two ships of the Velasco series.

Cristóbal Colón was built at the Arsenal de La Carraca in San Fernando, Spain. Her keel was laid on 13 June 1884 and was launched on 23 January 1887. Completed in 1889, she made 15 knots (28 km/h; 17 mph) on sea trials, probably the highest speed attained by a Velasco-class cruiser.

== Operational history ==
Shortly after Cristóbal Colón entered service in 1889, she anchored at San Sebastián, Spain, where the Spanish royal family spent its summers. Members of the royal family visited the cruiser on several occasions.

In June 1890, Cristóbal Colón deployed to the Bay of Cádiz so that a technical committee could observe trials of the submarine Peral. Cristóbal Colón embarked some 200 military and civilian guests on 25 June 1890 to watch Peral attempt two simulated attacks on the cruiser, one during daylight and the other at night. Peral was unable to make the daylight attack, but the simulated night attack was successful.

Shortly after her operations with Peral, Cristóbal Colón transported the Spanish ambassador from Spain to Morocco. Subsequently, she was stationed at Fernando Po for a short time. She then received orders to replace her sister ship Infanta Isabel at the Río de la Plata naval station in South America and arrived at Montevideo, Uruguay, on 14 November 1890 to begin this service.

An insurrection began on Cuba in February 1895, and Cristóbal Colón was assigned to the naval base at Havana in the Captaincy General of Cuba for operations against rebel forces. While Cristóbal Colón patrolled the northwestern coast of Cuba to the north and south of Cape San Antonio to prevent weapons and supplies from reaching the rebels, a hurricane struck the area on 29 September 1895. Cristóbal Colón sought shelter in the Bahia Guadiana to the north of the cape. Contemporary press reporting provided two accounts of subsequent events. According to one, the storm gradually drove her toward the coast of Cuba, an attempt to anchor her failed when she dragged her anchor, and she finally ran aground on Colorado Reef south of Mantua. Another version of events held that after she entered the bay in darkness her commanding officer believed that she was a safe distance offshore, but she subsequently ran onto the reef. Her crew — an estimated 203 men — abandoned ship, and all survived, some reaching shore by swimming or clinging to wreckage and others in her boats. Infanta Isabel and the unprotected cruisers Conde de Venadito and Reina Cristina came to the scene and salvaged Cristóbal Colón′s safe and torpedo tubes and some of her guns. The wreck broke up on 1 October 1895 in another passing hurricane, a total loss.
