= Spanish cruiser Infanta Isabel =

Spanish Navy cruiser of 1887–1926

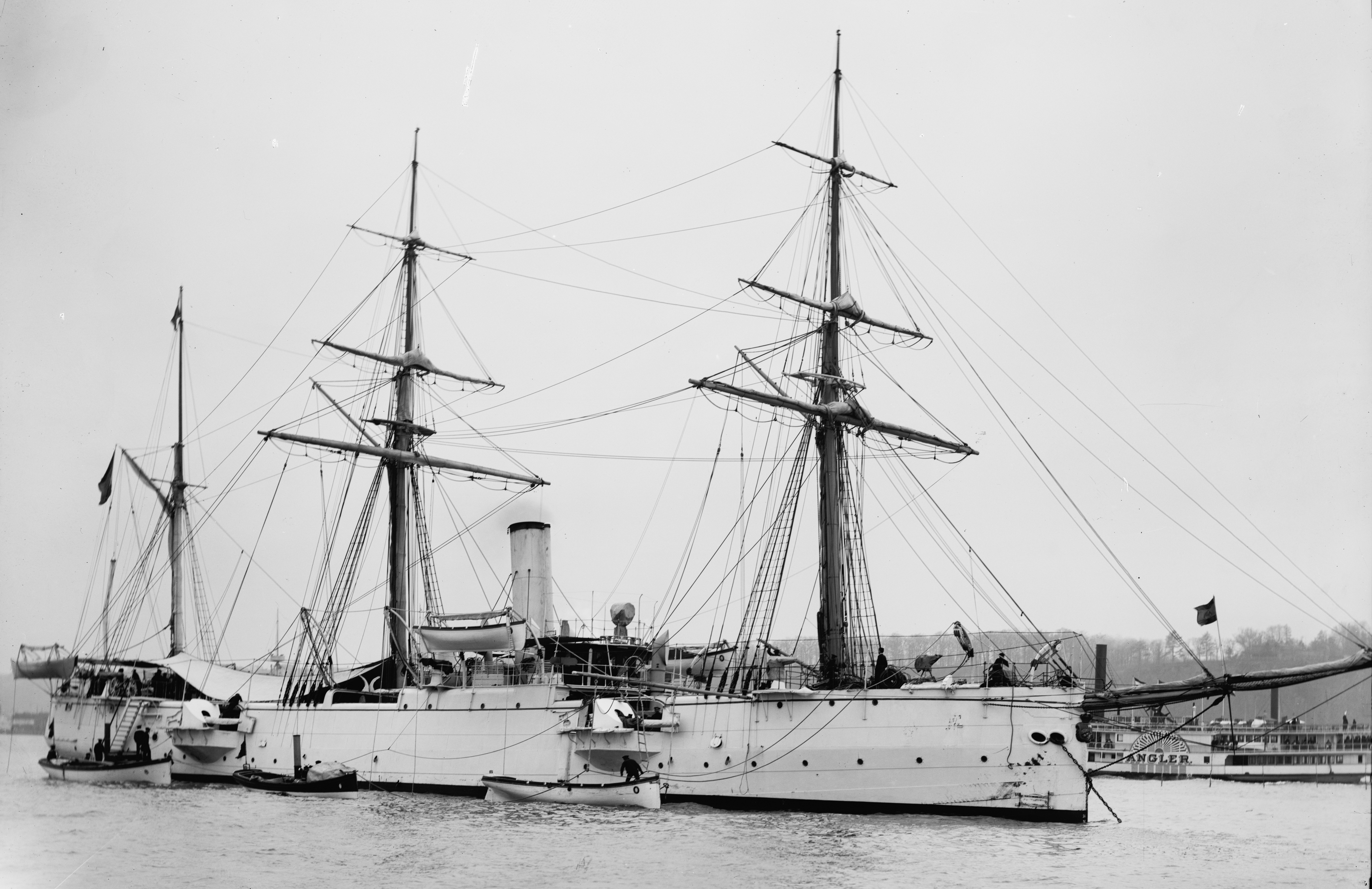
- Infanta Isabel at New York City in May 1893.

History

Spain
- Name: Infanta Isabel
- Namesake: Infanta Isabel, Countess of Girgenti (1851–1931)
- Ordered: 1 July 1882
- Builder: Arsenal de La Carraca, San Fernando, Spain
- Cost: 1,150,000 pesetas.
- Laid down: 19 August 1883
- Launched: 24 June 1885
- Completed: 1887
- Decommissioned: 1926
- Stricken: 1927
- Fate: Scrapped 1927

General characteristics
- Class & type: Velasco-class unprotected cruiser
- Displacement: 1,152 tons
- Length: 64.01 m (210 ft 0 in)
- Beam: 9.75 m (32 ft 0 in)
- Height: 5.33 m (17 ft 6 in)
- Draft: 4.17 m (13 ft 8 in) maximum
- Installed power: 1,500 ihp (1,119 kW)
- Propulsion: Horizontal compound steam engine, 4-cylinder boilers, 1 shaft; 200 to 220 tons coal (normal), 240 tons coal (maximum)
- Sail plan: Barque-rigged; Sail area: 1,132 m^{2} (12,185 sq ft) (as built); 823 m^{2} (8,859 sq ft) (later)
- Speed: 14 knots (26 km/h; 16 mph)
- Range: 2,000 nmi (3,700 km; 2,300 mi)
- Complement: As built: 173 officers and enlisted men; By 1921: 194 officers and enlisted men
- Armament: As built: 4 × 4.7-inch (120 mm) guns; 4 × 6 pdr guns; 1 × machine gun; 2 × 14 in (356 mm) torpedo tubes (removed 1900); 1911: 1 × 70 mm (2.8 in) Skoda gun; 10 × 57 mm (2.2 in) guns; By 1921: 1 × 66 mm (2.6 in) gun; 10 × 57 mm (2.2 in) guns

Infanta Isabel was a Velasco-class unprotected cruiser of the Spanish Navy in commission from 1887 to 1926. Her 39 years in commission made her the longest-lived ship of the Velasco class. She was the first metal-hulled cruiser built in Spain.

Infanta Isabel was named for Infanta Isabel, Countess of Girgenti and Princess of Asturias (1851–1931), oldest daughter of Queen Isabella II of Spain and her husband Francisco de Asís, Duke of Cádiz, and heiress presumptive to the Spanish throne from 1851 to 1857.

== Characteristics ==
Isabel II was a Velasco-class iron-hulled unprotected cruiser designed for colonial service in the Spanish Empire. She had an unarmored iron hull and was rigged as a barque, with three masts and a bowsprit. She had one rather tall funnel. The first metal-hulled cruiser built in Spain, she was one of six ships of her class built in Spain, which were armed differently from and slightly faster than the first two ships of the class, both of which were built in the United Kingdom.

Infanta Isabel displaced 1,190 tons. She was 64 metres (210 ft 0 in) long and 9.70 metres (31 ft 10 in) in beam, 5.33 metres (17 ft 6 in) in height, and 3.86 metres (12 ft 8 in) in draft. She had a double-pressure steam engine with four boilers that generated 1,500 horsepower (1,119 kW). She had a sail area of 1,132 square metres (12,185 sq ft), later reduced to 823 square metres (8,859 sq ft). She could reach a maximum speed of 14 knots (26 km/h; 16 mph). She could carry up to 240 tons of coal and had a range of 2,000 nautical miles (3,700 km; 2,300 mi). Her armament consisted of four 120-millimetre (4.7 in) Hontoria guns, two 70-millimetre (2.8 in) guns, four machine guns, and two torpedo tubes. She had a crew of 180 men. Her construction cost was 1,150,000 pesetas.

== Construction and commissioning ==
Infanta Isabel′s construction was authorized on 1 July 1882, and her keel was laid at the Arsenal de La Carraca in San Fernando, Spain, on 19 August 1883. She was launched on 24 June 1885 and completed and commissioned in 1887.

== Service history ==
=== 1887–1890 ===
In 1887, Infanta Isabel received orders to proceed to the South American Station at the Río de la Plata (River Plate) and replace the screw corvette Africa there. She arrived at Montevideo, Uruguay, on 17 June 1887. On 10 July 1887, she collaborated with local authorities at Buenos Aires, Argentina, during disastrous flooding and evacuated people from Recreo Island in the Riachuelo River, saving 27 lives. Grateful Argentinians held numerous celebrations in her honor and presented her with a commemorative plaque. She returned to Montevideo on 25 July 1887, but returned to Buenos Aires several times and steamed up the Uruguay River, providing various services.

Infanta Isabel′s commanding officer submitted a request on 21 June 1888 to be relieved of command due to illness and because he already had commanded her for two years. On 25 December 1888 Capitán de fragata (Frigate Captain) Ramón Auñón y Villalón, a future Minister of the Navy, reported aboard as her new commander. On 25 April 1890 the President of Uruguay, Julio Herrera y Obes, visited the ship.

The Revolution of the Park broke out in Argentina on 25 July 1890 and several rebel ships of the Argentine Navy bombarded the government palace and other public buildings. Infanta Isabel was the flagship of an international squadron which also included the British Royal Navy screw sloop HMS Beagle and gunboat HMS Bramble, the United States Navy armed sidewheel paddle steamer USS Tallapoosa, and the Uruguayan Navy gunboat General Rivera that anchored in the southern basin of the Río de la Plata and threatened to attack the rebel ships if they did not halt the bombardment. Auñón then boarded the Argentine torpedo ram Maipu to negotiate with rebel Lieutenant Eduardo O'Connor. The revolt was crushed by 29 July and the ringleaders were imprisoned.

On 18 September 1890 Auñón received orders for Infanta Isabel to return to Spain. She began her homeward voyage when she departed Montevideo on 12 October 1890, setting course for Cádiz. Her sister ship Cristóbal Colón arrived at Montevideo on 14 November 1890 to replace her.

=== 1891–1897 ===
On 12 October 1892, Infanta Isabel participated in a naval review held at New York City on the 400th anniversary of Christopher Columbus′s discovery of the Americas. As celebrations of the quadricentennial of the discovery continued, another major event at New York, the International Columbian Naval Rendezvous and Review, was scheduled for 1893. In February 1893, replicas of Christopher Columbus's three ships, the caravels Niña and Pinta and the carrack Santa Maria, left Huelva, Spain, bound for Havana in the Captaincy General of Cuba. They departed Havana on 15 April 1893 under the overall command of Infanta Isabel′s commanding officer bound for the United States, with Infanta Isabel towing the replica of Pinta, the protected cruiser Reina Regente towing the replica of Santa María, and the gunboat Nueva España towing the replica of Niña. They arrived at dawn on 21 April at Hampton Roads, Virginia, where a U.S. Navy squadron and other foreign warships were waiting for them. Accompanied by the U.S. Navy squadron and the other foreign warships, they set out at dawn on 23 April for New York City, where they arrived that night and anchored in the Lower Bay of New York Harbor. They took part in the Columbian Naval Review on the Hudson River at New York on 27 April 1893. Reina Regente remained behind at New York for drydock work, but Infanta Isabel and Nueva España got underway from New York on 2 May for Havana, which they reached on 8 May 1893.

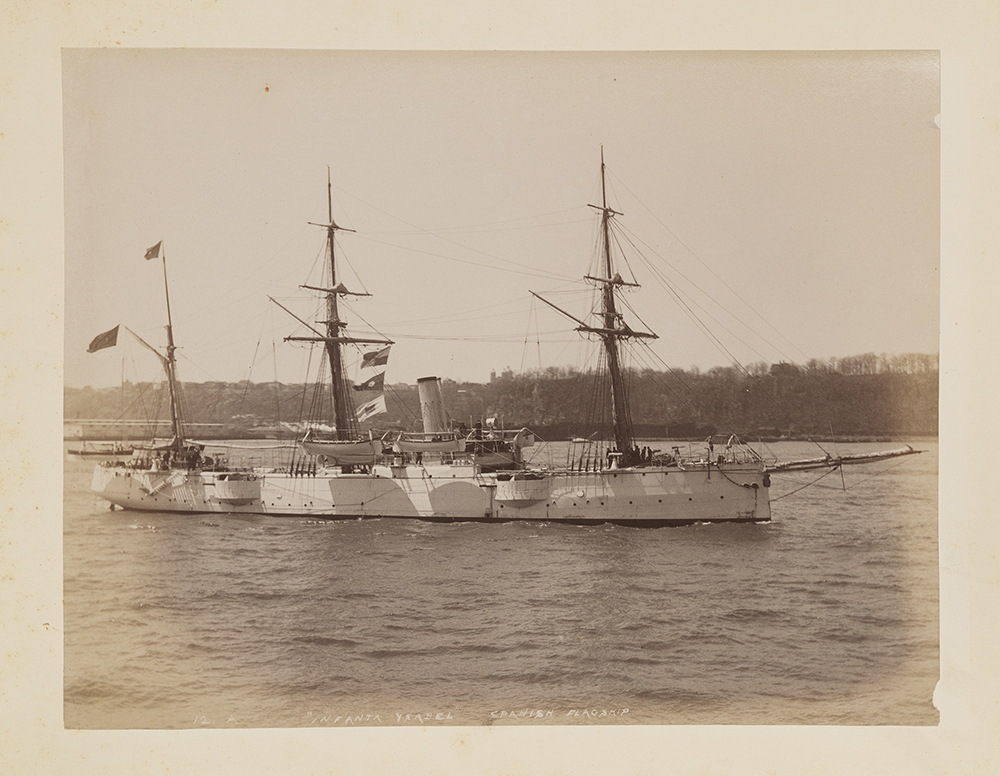
Infanta Isabel in 1893.

Meanwhile, on 19 April 1893, Princess Eulalia of Spain boarded the screw steamer Reina Maria Cristina at Santander, Spain, for a visit to the Caribbean and the United States as Spain's representative to the 1893 Columbian Exposition in Chicago, Illinois. She stopped first at Puerto Rico on 5 May, then at Havana from 8 to 15 May, before arriving in New York Harbor on 18 May 1893. There Eulalia and her entourage transferred from Reina Maria Cristina to Infanta Isabel, from which they made their official landing at Sandy Hook, New Jersey, where U.S. officials greeted them. Eulalia subsequently visited Washington, D.C., where President Grover Cleveland received her at the White House, before heading to Chicago for the exposition.

After her sister ship Cristóbal Colón sank off Cuba on 29 September 1895, Infanta Isabel, her sister ship Conde de Venadito, and the unprotected cruiser Reina Cristina engaged in salvage efforts at the scene of the wreck. They succeeded in recovering Cristóbal Colón′s safe and torpedo tubes and some of her guns.

By 1897, Infanta Isabel was part of the Training Squadron. To represent Spain at ceremonies in the United States recognizing what would have been the 75th birthday of the late President Ulysses S. Grant and celebrating the opening of Grant's Tomb in New York City, Infanta Isabel got underway from Mahón on Menorca in the Balearic Islands on 3 April 1897 in company with the armored cruiser Infanta Maria Teresa and proceeded to New York, which the two ships reached on the day of the tomb's dedication, 27 April 1897. After completing their participation in the planned events, the two cruisers departed New York on 11 May 1897. They arrived at Mahón at the end of June 1897 and rejoined their squadron.

=== 1898–1927 ===
The Spanish-American War broke out when the United States declared war on Spain on 25 April 1898, stipulating that the declaration was retroactive to 21 April. Infanta Isabel was at Havana when the war began. Her machinery required repairs, preventing her from putting to sea, and she remained inactive at Havana throughout the conflict. The war ended on 13 August 1898. After the war, Spain and the United States signed the Treaty of Paris, which in its Article V stated that "[...] Flags and standards, warships not captured, portable weapons, cannons of all calibers will be the property of Spain..." Under this provision, Infanta Isabel returned to Spain in company with Conde de Venadito.

In accordance with a Ministry of the Navy decree of 18 May 1900, 25 Spanish Navy ships were decommissioned because of their lack of combat value. Regarding Infanta Isabel, however, the decree stated "The Infanta Isabel, also of no military value, is suitable for service in the Canary Islands, the Gold Coast, and the possessions of Guinea, and her conservation, as long as there is no other of military efficiency, seems unavoidable. [...] Art. 2. Of the remaining ships, the Numancia, the Vitoria, and the Infanta Isabel will be decommissioned when they require the replacement of their current boilers or other important repairs or careening." Unlike her two surviving sister ships, Conde de Venadito and Isabel II, which were decommissioned in 1900, Infanta Isabel had her torpedo tubes removed, was converted into a gunboat, and remained in service.

Infanta Isabel was in the Bay of La Concha off San Sebastián, Spain, when she suffered a boiler explosion on 3 August 1900. The explosion killed two men and injured 22 others.

In 1902, Infanta Isabel steamed to the Canary Islands to rendezvous with the torpedo boats Ariete, Azor, and Rayo, which had been stationed there since they were separated from Contralmirante (Counter Admiral) Pascual Cervera y Topete's squadron in April 1898 when it deployed to the Caribbean during the Spanish-American War. She escorted the three torpedo boats back to Spain. In early January 1903, she deployed to Morocco to protect Spanish citizens and interests during unrest there. On 15 September 1904, she arrived at Mahón with a crew of 188 on board. From 8 to 10 April 1907, she was part of a Spanish Navy squadron that assembled at Cartagena, Spain, on the occasion of the visit of the British King Edward VII.

Infanta Isabel was modernized between 1910 and 1911, during which her flanking redoubts were removed and her armament was altered to a single 70-millimetre (2.8 in) Skoda gun on her forecastle and ten 57-millimetre (2.2 in) guns on her broadsides, with five on each side. During the following years, Infanta Isabel served along the coasts of the Gulf of Guinea, Spanish Sahara, and Morocco. By 1921 her armament had become one 66-millimetre (2.6 in) and ten 57-millimetre (2.2 in) guns and her complement had risen to 194. She finally was decommissioned in 1926 after 39 years of service, by far the longest-lived ship of her class. She was stricken and scrapped in 1927.
