= SMS Don Juan d'Austria =

The Austro-Hungarian Navy operated a pair of ironclad warships named SMS Don Juan d'Austria:

- SMS Don Juan d'Austria (1862), an armored frigate launched in 1862
- SMS Don Juan d'Austria (1875), a center battery ship launched in 1875

== See also ==
- USS Don Juan de Austria
- Spanish cruiser Don Juan de Austria
