= Don Antonio de Ulloa =

Don Antonio de Ulloa may refer to:

- Antonio de Ulloa, a Spanish general, explorer, author, astronomer, and colonial administrator.
- Don Antonio de Ulloa, a Spanish Navy cruiser that fought at the Battle of Manila Bay during the Spanish–American War.
