= Spanish cruiser Isabel II =

Spanish Navy cruiser of 1887–1907

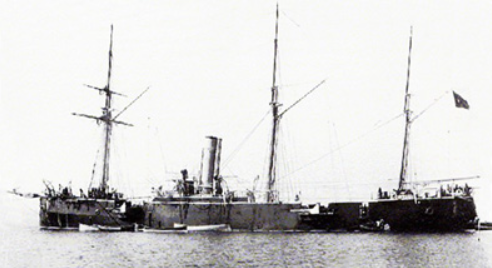

History

Spain
- Name: Infanta Isabel
- Namesake: Princess Isabella of Spain
- Ordered: 11 September 1883
- Builder: Reales Astilleros de Esteiro, Ferrol, Spain
- Laid down: October 1883
- Renamed: Isabel II 31 December 1883
- Namesake: Queen Isabella II of Spain.
- Launched: 19 February 1886
- Completed: 1887
- Commissioned: 1887
- Decommissioned: 18 May 1900
- Fate: Hulked 1900
- Stricken: 1907 or 1935 (see test)

General characteristics
- Class & type: Velasco-class unprotected cruiser
- Displacement: 1,152 tons
- Length: 64.01 m (210 ft 0 in)
- Beam: 9.75 m (32 ft 0 in)
- Draft: 4.17 m (13 ft 8 in) maximum
- Installed power: 1,500 ihp (1,119 kW)
- Propulsion: Horizontal compoundsteam engine, 4-cylinder boilers, 1 shaft; 200 to 220 tons of coal (normal); 250 tons coal (maximum)
- Sail plan: Barque-rigged
- Speed: 13 knots (24 km/h; 15 mph)
- Range: 1,600 nmi (3,000 km; 1,800 mi)
- Complement: 173 officers and enlisted
- Armament: 4 × 4.7-inch (119 mm) guns; 1 × 66 mm gun; 4 × 6 pdr guns; 1 × machine gun; 2 × 14 in (356 mm) torpedo tubes

Isabel II was a Velasco-class unprotected cruiser of the Spanish Navy in commission from 1887 to 1900. She fought at San Juan, Puerto Rico, during the Spanish–American War. She named after Queen Isabella II of Spain.

== Characteristics and construction ==
Isabel II was a Velasco-class iron-hulled unprotected cruiser designed for colonial service in the Spanish Empire. She was barque-rigged, with three masts and a bowsprit, and she had one rather tall funnel. She was one of the six ships of the class built in Spain, which were armed differently from and slightly faster than the first two ships of the class, both of which were built in the United Kingdom.

The construction of a Velasco-class unprotected cruiser to be named Infanta Isabel was authorized by a Royal Order of 11 September 1883. Her keel was laid at the Reales Astilleros de Esteiro shipyard in Ferrol, Spain in October 1883. Her construction soon was suspended, and on 31 December 1883 a Royal Order changed her name to Isabel II. Construction resumed in June 1884, and the ship was launched on 19 February 1886. Isabel II was completed in and commissioned in 1887.

== Operational history ==
=== 1887–1897 ===
Isabel II was assigned to duty at Fernando Po in the Bight of Biafra off the coast of West Africa, where she replaced the screw schooner Ligera. The protected cruiser Marqués de la Ensenada replaced her early in 1893, and Isabel II began her return to Spain, setting course for Cádiz. During her voyage, her rudder broke while she was off Dakar on the coast of Senegal on 27 February 1893, forcing her to put into port at Dakar to await the arrival of her sister ship Conde de Venadito. Conde de Venadito took her under tow, and the two ships anchored in the Bay of Cádiz on 27 March 1893.

Isabel II was part of the Training Squadron in August 1895 when the squadron — which also included the battleship Pelayo (which was the squadron's flagship), the armored cruiser Vizcaya, the unprotected cruiser Alfonso XII, and Marqués de la Ensenada — received orders to proceed to Tangier to register a protest with the Sultan of Morocco over numerous attacks on merchant ships and fishing vessels. When the squadron anchored at Tangier, it found three Imperial German Navy and six British Royal Navy warships there. The squadron returned to Spain with its arrival at Algeciras on 17 August 1895.

Isabel II was assigned to the Captaincy General of Cuba in 1896. Among the missions she carried out in the Caribbean was a visit to Port-au-Prince, Haiti, to pressure the Government of Haiti not to support rebels in Cuba fighting against the Spanish in the Cuban War of Independence.

=== Spanish-American War ===
The Spanish–American War began on 25 April 1898 when the United States declared war on Spain, stipulating that the declaration was retroactive to 21 April. Isabel II was at San Juan, Puerto Rico, with the destroyer Terror, the gunboats General Concha and Ponce de León, and several smaller vessels when the war broke out. In May 1898, several United States Navy ships appeared at the entrance to the port, among them the auxiliary cruisers USS Saint Paul and USS Yosemite. The United States Navy established a permanent blockade of San Juan on 18 June 1898.

On 22 June 1898, Isabel II and Terror sortied from San Juan to attack Saint Paul, beginning the Second Battle of San Juan. However, the poor condition of Isabel II′s boilers limited her to a speed of 6 knots (11 km/h; 6.9 mph), and it soon became apparent that she would have to retire to San Juan. Terror attempted to cover Isabel II′s withdrawal by making a torpedo attack, but Saint Paul thwarted it by putting Terror′s rudder out of action. This caused Terror to turn in a manner which allowed St. Paul to score direct hits near Terror′s waterline, disabling one of Terror's steam engines. Taking on a list, Terror withdrew toward the coast and beached herself to keep from sinking. Terror suffered two men killed and several wounded, the only casualties either side sustained during the battle, but Terror did not return to action during the war.

On 16 June 1898, a Spanish blockade runner carrying a cargo of food, ammunition, and 12 artillery pieces for Spanish forces on Puerto Rico, the merchant steamer Antonio Lopez got underway from Cádiz with the Philippines-bound squadron of Contralmirante (Counter Admiral) Manuel de la Cámara, then parted company with Cámara to proceed independently to San Juan. The Third Battle of San Juan began on 28 June 1898 when Yosemite sighted Antonio Lopez as she approached San Juan. Antonio Lopez put on her best speed in an attempt to find shelter under the guns of Fort San Felipe del Morro and El Cañuelo and Yosemite gave chase, firing at Antonio Lopez as she ran and setting her on fire. Antonio Lopez ran hard aground on a reef, and her crew abandoned ship as the forts sought to protect her by opening fire on Yosemite, which continued to close with Antonio Lopez while zigzagging to spoil the forts' aim. Meanwhile, Isabel II, General Concha, and Ponce de Leon sortied to save Antonio Lopez. Isabel II′s gunfire temporarily drove off Yosemite, but Yosemite soon returned with Saint Paul and the protected cruiser USS New Orleans. The Spanish and American warships exchanged long-range gunfire and, although neither side scored any hits, the Americans forced Isabel II and General Concha to withdraw under the guns of the forts and Ponce de Leon to take cover behind the burning Antonio Lopez. The Spaniards managed to salvage almost all of Antonio Lopez's cargo, losing only one artillery piece overboard, before New Orleans returned on 16 July to sink her wreck with gunfire.

After the Third Battle of San Juan, Isabel II and the rest of the Spanish ships at San Juan remained in port through the end of the war on 13 August 1898. The war ended in a decisive defeat of Spain.

=== Later service ===
On September 14, 1898, Isabel II left Puerto Rico bound for Spain with Terror, General Concha, and Ponce de León. Deemed lacking in combat value and not worth the cost of further maintenance or repair, she was decommissioned on 18 May 1900 and hulked as a floating jetty and torpedo boat school at Cartagena. One source claims she was stricken from the Spanish Navy list in 1907, another that she did not disappear from the navy list until 1935.
