= Cristobal Colon =

Cristobal Colon may refer to:

- The Spanish name of the explorer known in English as Christopher Columbus
- Spanish cruiser Cristóbal Colón (1887), an unprotected Spanish cruiser that foundered off Cuba in 1895
- Spanish cruiser Cristóbal Colón, a Spanish armoured cruiser that fought in the Battle of Santiago de Cuba during the Spanish–American War in 1898
- Spanish frigate Cristóbal Colón, a 2010 Spanish air defence frigate of the Álvaro de Bazán class
- Cristóbal, Colón, a port on the Atlantic side of the Panama Canal
- Pico Cristóbal Colón, the highest mountain in Colombia
- Cristóbal Colón Ruiz (born 1954), Puerto Rican politician
