= Princesa de Asturias-class cruiser =

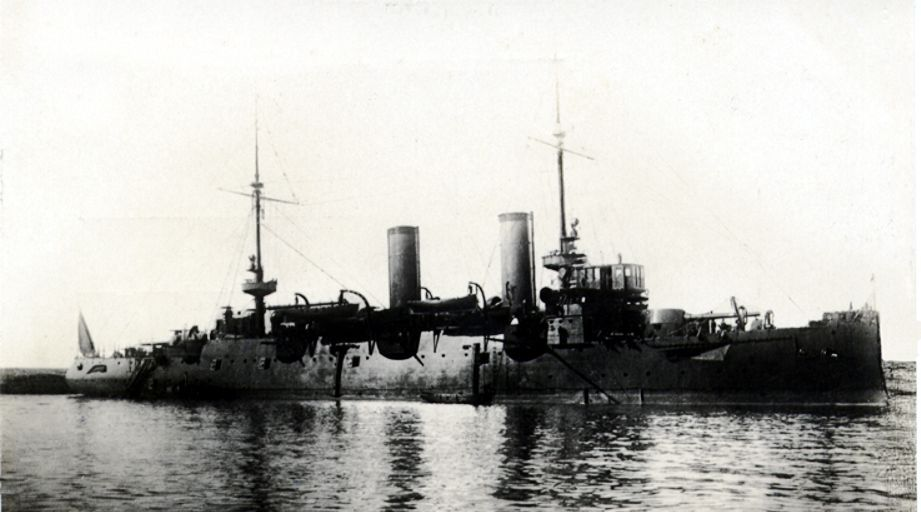
- Cataluña in 1914

Class overview
- Name: Princesa de Asturias class
- Builders: La Carraca Shipyard; Cartagena Navy Yard; Ferrol Dockyard
- Operators: Spanish Navy
- Built: 1890–1904
- In commission: 1902–1929
- Completed: 3
- Lost: 1
- Retired: 2

General characteristics
- Type: Armoured cruiser
- Displacement: 6,888 tons
- Length: 110.97 m (364 ft 1 in)
- Beam: 18.59 m (61 ft 0 in)
- Draught: 6.61 m (21 ft 8 in)
- Propulsion: 14,800 hp (11,000 kW), two shafts
- Speed: 20 knots (37 km/h; 23 mph)
- Complement: 542
- Armament: 2 × 9.4 in (24 cm) (2 × 1); 8 × 5.5 in (14 cm) (8 × 1); 8 × 57 mm (2.2 in)/42
- Armour: 11.88 in (30.2 cm) belt; 7.88 in (20.0 cm) barbette; 7.88 in (20.0 cm) conning tower; 3.88 in (9.9 cm) turret; 2.25 in (5.7 cm) deck

The Princesa de Asturias class was a class of armoured cruisers of the Spanish Navy during the late 19th and early 20th centuries. The class comprised three ships, Princesa de Asturias, Cataluña and Cardenal Cisneros. With construction beginning on the lead ship of the class in 1890, it was considered to be essentially a repeat of the three Infanta Maria Teresa-class cruisers but with more modern and balanced armament. Cardenal Cisneros was wrecked in 1905 and the other two ships were discarded in the late 1920s.

== Design ==
=== Dimensions and machinery ===
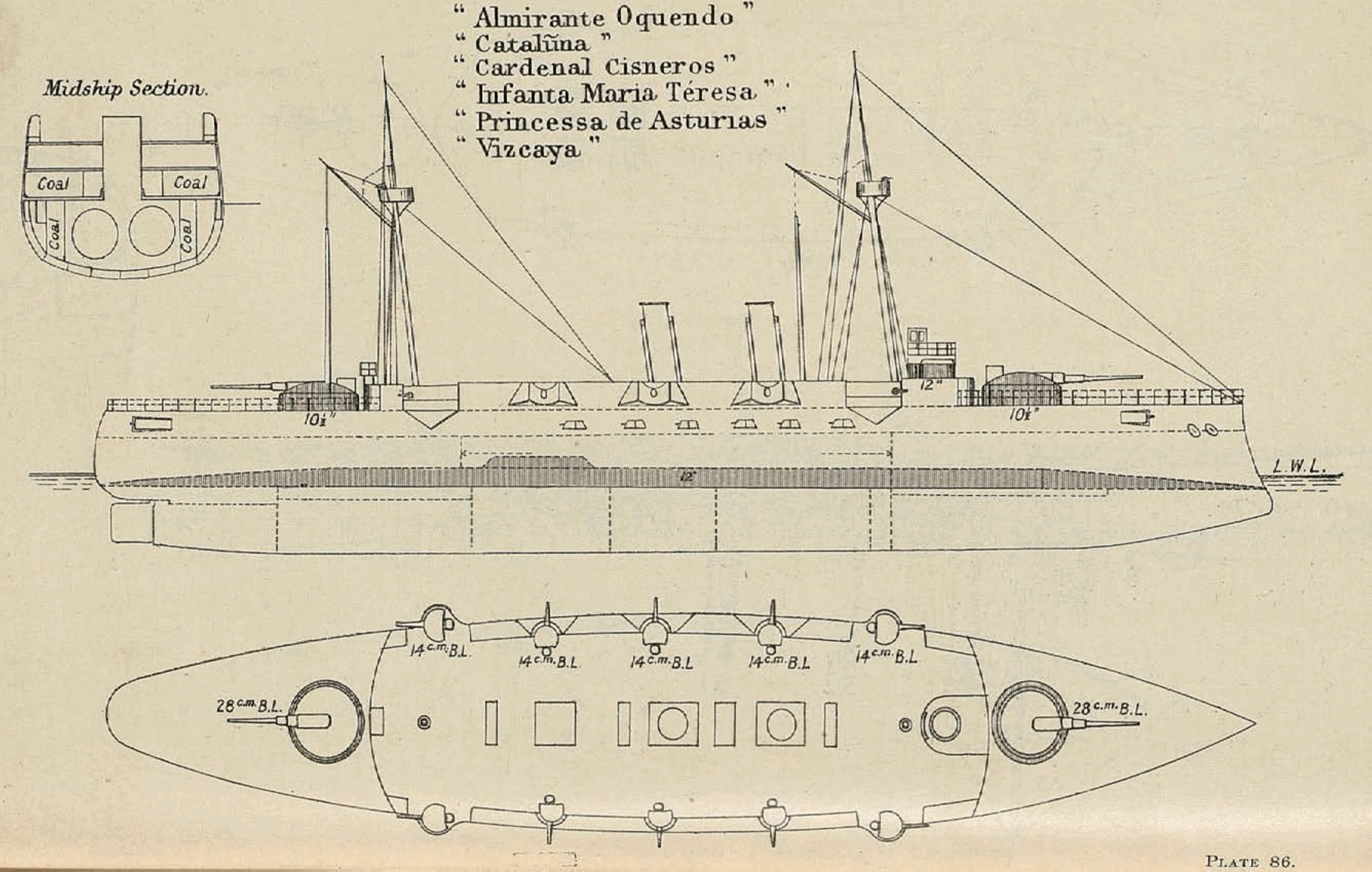
Plan and profile of the Cardenal Cisneros class, which was an improvement of the Infanta Maria Teresa class

The ships of the class were 110.97 metres (364 ft 1 in) long, had a beam of 18.59 metres (61 ft 0 in), a draught of 6.61 metres (21 ft 8 in), and had a displacement of 6,888 ton. The ships were equipped with two-shaft reciprocating engines, which were rated at 14,800 ihp (11,000 kW) and produced a top speed of 20 knots (37 km/h; 23 mph).

=== Armour ===
The ships had belt armour of 11.88 in (30.2 cm), conning tower and barbette armour of 7.88 in (20.0 cm), 3.88 in (9.9 cm) turret armour and 2.25 in (5.7 cm) deck armour. However, as these ships were fundamentally modernized Infanta Maria Teresa-class cruisers, the armour coverage was not comprehensive, and thus the ships were poorly armoured by standards of the day.

=== Armament ===
The main armament of the ships were two 9.4 in (24 cm) single turret guns. Secondary armament included eight single 5.5 in (14 cm) guns.

== Ships ==
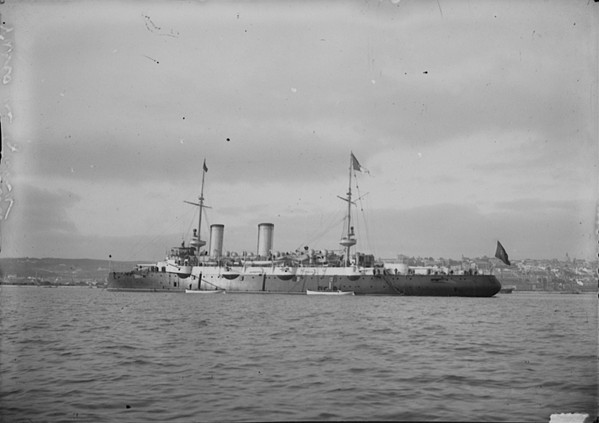
An unidentified Cardenal Cisneros-class vessel

- Princesa de Asturias was ordered September 1889 and laid down at the La Carraca shipyard in San Fernando in 1890. She was launched on 17 October 1896, after an unsuccessful launch attempt on 9 October, and commissioned in 1902. She was discarded in 1927.
- Cataluña was laid down at Cartagena Navy Yard in 1890 and launched on 24 September 1900. She was commissioned in 1903. Cataluña was discarded in 1929.
- Cardenal Cisneros was laid down at the Ferrol dockyard in 1890. She was launched on 19 March 1897 and commissioned in 1902. She was lost when she ran aground on 28 October 1905.

== See also ==
- List of cruisers of Spain

== Sources ==
- Chesneau, Roger, and Eugene M. Kolesnik, Eds. Conway's All The World's Fighting Ships 1860–1905. New York, New York: Mayflower Books Inc., 1979. ISBN 0-8317-0302-4.
- Fitzsimmons, Bernard. "Carnenal Cisneros". Purnell's Illustrated Encyclopedia of Modern Weapons and Warfare. 2.
