= Spanish cruiser Aragón =

Spanish Navy Aragon-class cruiser

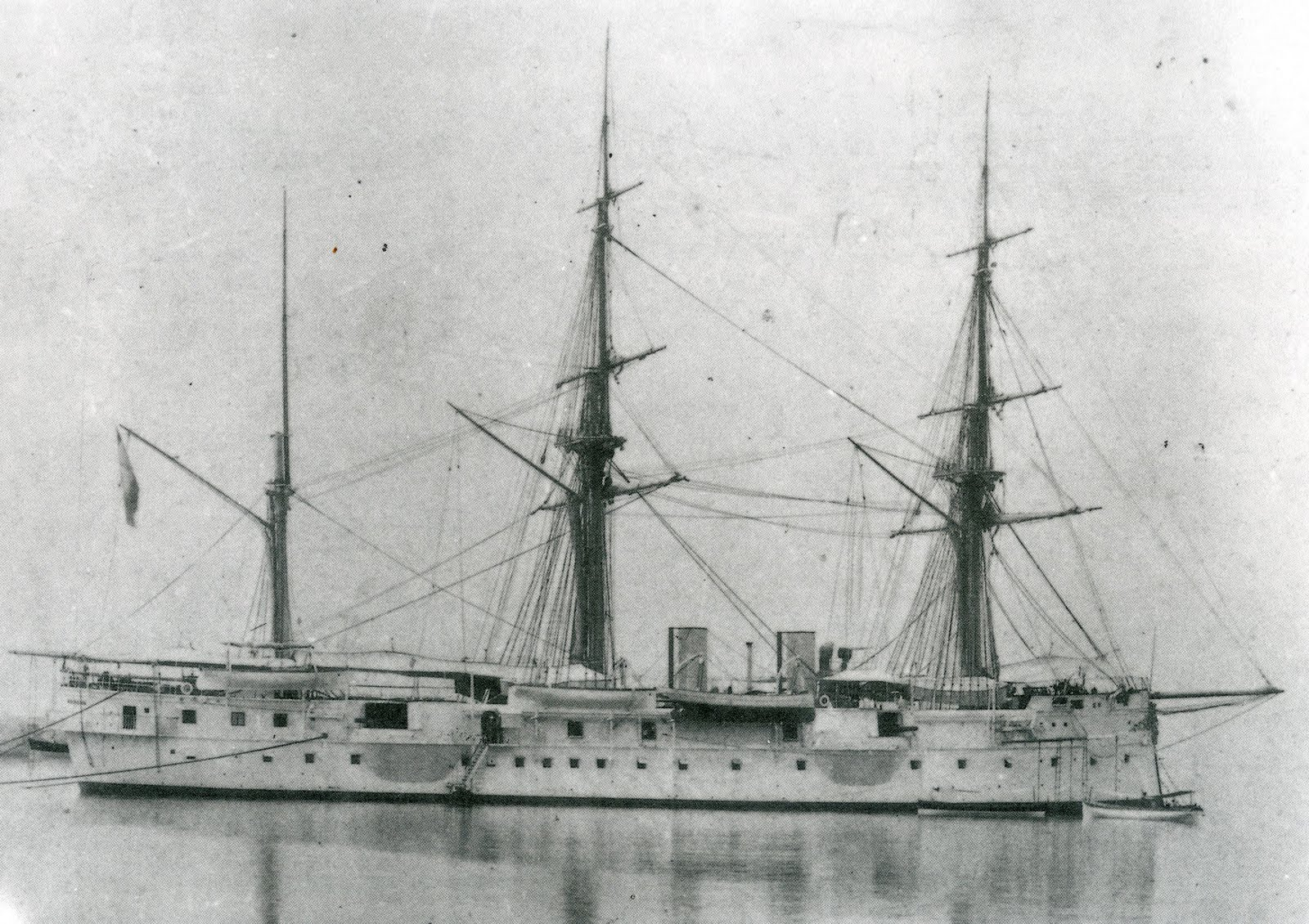
- Aragón

History

Spain
- Name: Aragon
- Namesake: The Kingdom of Aragon
- Ordered: January 1869
- Builder: Arsenal de Cartagena, Cartagena, Spain
- Laid down: 2 May 1869
- Launched: 31 July 1879
- Completed: 1880
- Commissioned: 1880
- Decommissioned: December 1898
- Fate: Hulked 1896 or 1897 (see text); Either sold for scrap 1900 or stricken c. 1905 (see text)

General characteristics
- Class & type: Aragon-class unprotected cruiser
- Displacement: 3,289 tons
- Length: 236 ft 0 in (71.93 m)
- Beam: 44 ft 0 in (13.41 m)
- Draft: 23 ft 6 in (7.16 m) maximum
- Installed power: 1,400 ihp (1,000 kW)
- Propulsion: 1-shaft, 3-cylinder, horizontal compound
- Sail plan: barque-rigged
- Speed: 14 knots (26 km/h; 16 mph)
- Range: 1,660 nmi (3,070 km; 1,910 mi)
- Complement: 392 officers and enlisted
- Armament: As completed, included 8 × 8 in (203 mm) 180-pounder rifled muzzle-loading guns; In 1885: 6 × 6.4 in (163 mm) guns; 2 × 87 mm (3 in) guns; 4 × 75 mm (3 in) guns; 10 × machine guns; 2 × 14 in (356 mm) torpedo tubes
- Notes: 460 tons of coal (normal)

Aragón was a Spanish Navy Aragon-class unprotected cruiser in commission from 1880 to 1898. After early service in home waters she spent time on colonial duties in the Philippines before she was relegated to auxiliary service in Spain.

== Technical characteristics ==
Aragón was built at the naval shipyard at Cartagena, Spain. Her construction as an armored corvette with a central battery ironclad design began on 2 May 1869, with plans to give her 890 tons of armor and 500 millimetres (20 in) of armor at the waterline. Political events delayed her construction. In 1870, her design was changed to that of an unprotected cruiser or wooden corvette, and she finally was launched in this form on 31 July 1879 and completed in 1880 Her original conception as an armored ship and the change to an unarmored one during construction left her with an overly heavy wooden hull that was obsolescent by the time of her launch.

Designed for colonial service, Aragón had two funnels and was rigged as a barque. Her machinery was manufactured by the John Penn Company of Greenwich, United Kingdom. The original main battery of Armstrong-built 8-inch (203 mm) guns was obsolescent when she was completed, and were quickly replaced with more modern Hontoria-built 6.4-inch (163 mm) guns (a heavier main battery than that carried by her two sisters Castilla and Navarra), at least four of which were mounted in sponsons.

== Operational history ==
On 1 July 1882 Aragón got underway from Cartagena, Spain, on a training voyage for midshipmen in European waters.

With her arrival at Manila on Luzon in the autumn of 1882, Aragón began a deployment in the Philippines in the Spanish East Indies. On 26 October 1882, a Spanish squadron composed of Aragón, the unprotected cruisers Gravina and Velasco, the screw corvette Vencedora, the screw schooner Sirena, and the gunboats Arayak and Paragua 2 got underway from Manila for operations against the Jolo pirates, carrying a landing force consisting of 490 Spanish Marine Infantry personnel and naval infantrymen, 105 men of the Iberia Infantry Regiment, 111 men of the Jolo Infantry Regiment, and 100 men of a Manila disciplinary company. After the squadron reconnoitered the coast, fighting began when the landing force went ashore at Looc on 29 October 1882. On 30 October the Spanish force landed at Padang-Padang. After conducting several raids, the troops returned to the ships and landed at Boal on 8 November 1882. The squadron and troops returned to Manila in mid-November 1882.

During 1883, Aragón made several voyages to Japan, including a visit to Nagasaki in May 1883. Aragón, Gravina, Sirena, Vencedora, and Paragua 2 mounted another expedition against pirates in Jolo in November 1883, with Aragón serving as flagship. On 7 November, the ships bombarded Looc and the vicinity of Tapucan and Panlau-Panlau, then landed a force composed of two companies of Spanish Army soldiers totaling 810 men, a disciplinary company of 150 men, 70 convicts, Spanish marine infantrymen, and 400 sailors from the ships' crews. On 8 November the Spanish operations expanded to Boad. The Spanish force suffered two dead and 10 wounded. After reembarking the landing force, the ships returned to Zamboanga on 9 November 1883.

Aragón was flagship of the Cavite naval station in Manila Bay in 1886 during a diplomatic crisis between Spain and the German Empire over the status of the Caroline Islands, although in the end no conflict broke out. In 1886, Aragón participated in operations against Moro pirates on the Rio Grande de Mindanao, also known as the Mindanao River, on Mindanao, along with Sirena, the schooner Valiente, the gunboats Basco, Bulusan, Gardoqui, Pampanga, Panay, Paragua, Samar, and Urdaneta, and the transport San Quintín. The ships carried 3,400 Spanish Army soldiers, 10 field guns, and other equipment to Mindanao. The campaign failed to achieve its objectives, so on 19 January 1887 Aragón, several smaller warships, two transports, and five merchant ships launched a new offensive operation in Mindanao which concluded in March 1887.

Replaced in the Philippines by her sister ship Castilla, Aragón departed Manila on 5 April 1890 to return to Spain. After passing through the Suez Canal, she arrived at Barcelona, Spain, on 3 June 1890. Thereafter she was relegated to duties as an auxiliary ship and became the training ship for the Cádiz naval department. She was hulked as a floating depot in either 1896 or 1897, according to different sources.

== Decommissioning and disposal ==
Aragón was decommissioned in December 1898. Sources differ on her ultimate fate, stating that she was sold for scrap in 1900 and that she was stricken c. 1905
