= USS Don Juan de Austria =

Gunboat of the United States Navy

History

United States
- Name: Don Juan de Austria
- Namesake: John of Austria (Spanish Navy name retained)
- Builder: Naval shipyard at Cartagena, Spain
- Launched: 23 January 1887
- Acquired: Captured 1 May 1898
- Commissioned: 11 April 1900
- Decommissioned: 16 June 1919
- Fate: Sold 16 October 1919
- Notes: Served in Spanish Navy from 1887 to 1898

General characteristics
- Class & type: Velasco-class
- Type: Gunboat (ex-unprotected cruiser)
- Displacement: 1,015 tons
- Length: 215 ft 6 in (65.68 m)
- Beam: 32 ft 0 in (9.75 m)
- Draft: 12 ft 6 in (3.81 m) mean
- Installed power: 1,200 ihp (forced draft)
- Propulsion: 1-shaft horizontal compound, 4-cylinder boilers
- Sail plan: barque-rigged
- Speed: 12 knots
- Complement: 153 officers and enlisted
- Armament: 4 × 5 in (127 mm) guns; 4 × 6-pounder quick-firing guns; (5-inch (127 mm) guns later replaced by 4 × 4-inch (102 mm) guns)
- Armor: none
- Notes: Coal 225 tons

USS Don Juan de Austria was a U.S. Navy gunboat. Formerly a Spanish Navy Velasco class unprotected cruiser, she was captured in 1898 during the Spanish–American War and commissioned into the U.S. Navy.

For her technical characteristics and operational history as a Spanish ship, see Spanish cruiser Don Juan de Austria.

== Technical characteristics ==
Don Juan de Austria was built in 1887 at Cartagena, Spain, for the Spanish Navy. Sunk in shallow water on 1 May 1898 in the Battle of Manila Bay during the Spanish–American War, she was raised from Manila Bay under contract and overhauled and refitted at Hong Kong. The 4.7-inch (120-mm) guns she had in Spanish service were replaced with 5-inch (127-mm) guns mounted in sponsons on her main deck. In later years, these in turn were replaced with four 4-inch (102-mm) guns. She was rigged as a barque and had one funnel.

== Operational history ==
USS Don Juan de Austria commissioned at Hong Kong on 11 April 1900. From 5 June 1900 to 18 October 1900 Don Juan de Austria was anchored off Canton, China, to protect American interests during the Boxer Rebellion.

She sailed from Hong Kong 25 November 1900 and arrived at Cavite in the Philippine Islands on 28 November 1900. She was employed in the Philippines in general duties in connection with taking possession of the newly acquired territory, supporting U.S. Army operations against the insurgent native forces (see Philippine Revolution), transporting troops and stores, blockading insurgent supply routes, and seizing and searching various towns to ensure American control. Aside from a visit to Yokohama, Japan, from 1 June 1902 to 27 July 1902, she continued her duty in the pacification of the islands until 19 April 1903.

After repairs at Yokohama, Japan, from 27 April 1903 to 1 June 1903, Don Juan de Austria cruised along the Chinese coast for maneuvers with the U.S. fleet, an indication of intensified American interest in the Far East after the acquisition of Pacific island territories. She departed Hong Kong 16 December 1903 for the United States, sailing by way of Singapore, Ceylon, India, the Suez Canal, and Mediterranean ports to arrive at Portsmouth Navy Yard, Kittery, Maine, on 21 April 1904. She was out of commission for repairs from 5 May 1904 to 10 December 1905.

Joining the Third Squadron, Atlantic Fleet, Don Juan de Austria sailed from Norfolk, Virginia, on 28 February 1906 to patrol off the Dominican Republic to protect American interests there. She returned to Portsmouth Navy Yard on 21 February 1907 and was placed out of commission there on 7 March 1907.

Loaned to the Michigan Naval Militia, she sailed from Portsmouth 28 July 1907 by way of the St. Lawrence River to Detroit, Michigan, serving there on training duty until the American entry into World War I in April 1917.

Don Juan de Austria was recommissioned on 6 April 1917, and left Detroit on 17 July 1917 for Newport, Rhode Island, arriving there on 6 August 1917. She patrolled inshore and at sea off New England's coast. On 12 November 1917 she went ashore near Woods Hole, Massachusetts. Refloated and returned to service. She arrived at New York, New York, on 7 August 1918 to escort two U.S. Army tugs and their barge tows to Bermuda.

She then returned to Newport 1 October 1918 and towed the sailing schooner USS Charles Whittemore to Charleston, South Carolina, before revisiting Bermuda to escort a group of American and French submarines to Newport, arriving 1 November 1918. The war ended on 11 November 1918.

On 3 April 1919, Don Juan de Austria arrived at Boston, Massachusetts, to join the special escort for the transports returning members of the 26th Division, U.S. Army, from Europe.

She was decommissioned at Portsmouth, New Hampshire, on 18 June 1919, and sold 16 October 1919.
