= Spanish cruiser Don Antonio de Ulloa =

Spanish Velasco-class cruiser

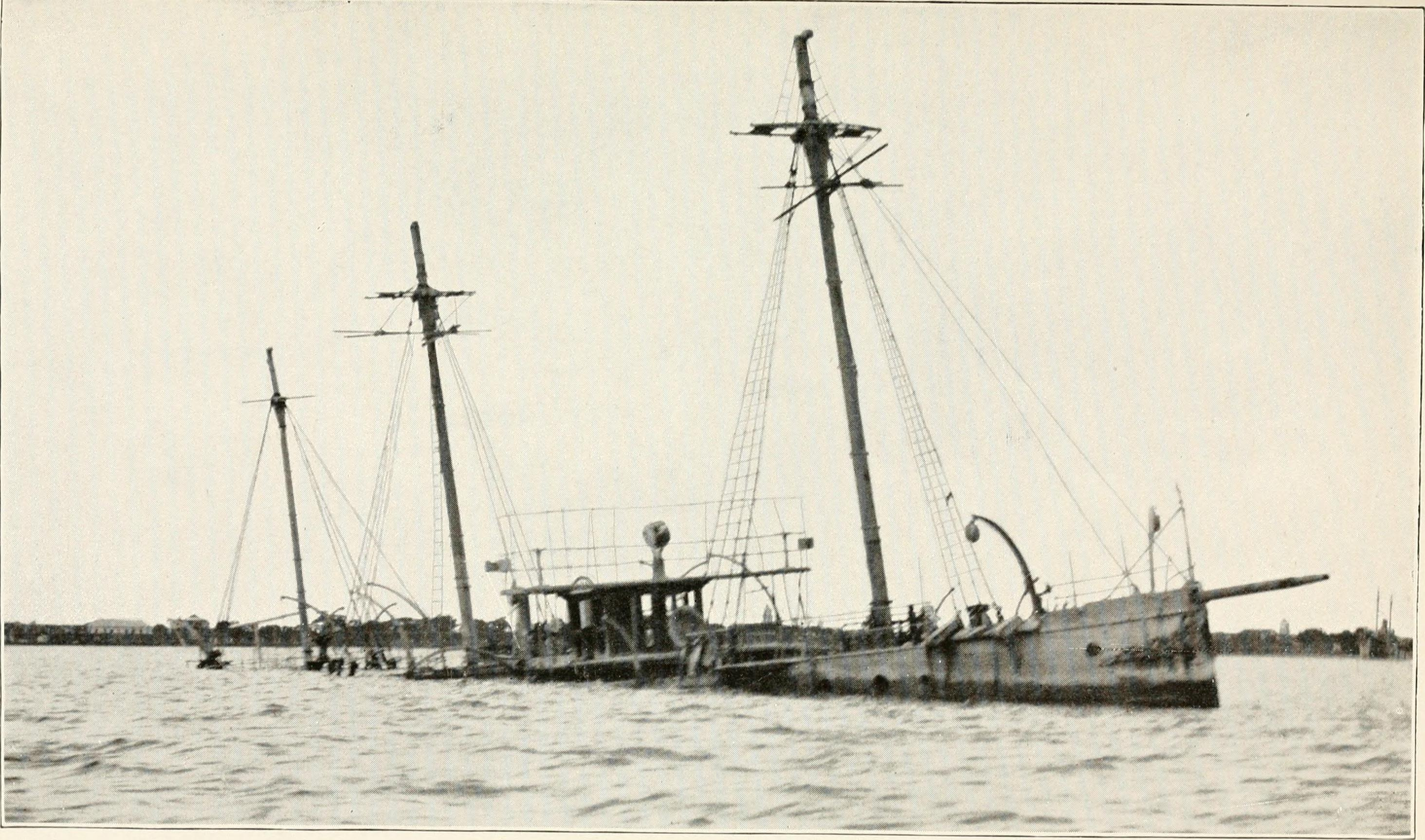
- Don Antonio de Ulloa, at the Battle of Manila Bay, 1 May 1898

History

Spain
- Name: Don Antonio de Ulloa
- Namesake: Antonio de Ulloa
- Builder: La Carraca shipyard, Cádiz, Spain
- Laid down: 1883
- Launched: 23 January 1887
- Completed: 1889
- Fate: Sunk 1 May 1898

General characteristics
- Class & type: Velasco-class unprotected cruiser
- Displacement: 1,152 tons
- Length: 210 ft 0 in (64.01 m)
- Beam: 32 ft 0 in (9.75 m)
- Draft: 13 ft 8 in (4.17 m) maximum
- Installed power: 1,500 ihp (1,100 kW)
- Propulsion: 1-shaft, horizontal compound, 4-cylinder boilers
- Sail plan: Barque-rigged
- Speed: 13 knots (24 km/h; 15 mph)
- Complement: 173 officers and enlisted
- Armament: 4 × 120-millimetre (4.7 in) guns; 4 × 6 pdr guns; 1 × machine gun; 2 × 14 in (356 mm) torpedo tubes
- Notes: 200 to 220 tons of coal (normal)

Don Antonio de Ulloa was a Velasco-class unprotected cruiser of the Spanish Navy that fought in the Battle of Manila Bay during the Spanish–American War. She was built at La Carraca shipyard, Cádiz, Spain. Her keel was laid in 1883 and the vessel was launched on 23 January 1887. Don Antonio de Ulloa took an active part in Spanish military action against Philippine insurgents during the "Tagalog Revolt" (1896–1897), the Spanish name for the first two years of the Philippine Revolution. During her overhaul in Manila bay whilst part of the squadron of Rear Admiral Patricio Montojo y Pasarón, the Battle of Manila Bay occurred. With her reduced complement, armament, and inability to maneuver she was sunk with little resistance.

== Technical characteristics ==
Don Antonio de Ulloa was built at La Carraca shipyard, Cádiz, Spain. Her keel was laid in 1883 and the vessel was launched on 23 January 1887. The ship was completed in 1889. She had one rather tall funnel. The cruiser had an iron hull and was rigged as a barque.

== Operational history ==
On 7 March 1890, Capitán de navío (ship-of-the-line captain) Manuel de la Cámara took command of the Philippine Division, a naval force composed of Don Antonio de Ulloa and the unprotected cruisers Castilla and Don Juan de Austria designated to reinforce the Spanish Navy's Asiatic Squadron in the Philippines. The division departed Cádiz on 9 April 1890. Transiting the Mediterranean Sea, Suez Canal, and Indian Ocean, the division encountered rough weather during its journey only in the Gulf of Lyons. It called at Barcelona, Port Said, Suez, Aden, and Colombo before arriving at Singapore on 2 June 1890. The three cruisers resumed their voyage the next day and arrived at Manila on 17 June 1890. In the Philippines, the division became known as the "Black Squadron" because its ships were painted black instead of white, as other Asiatic Squadron ships were. Although a captain, Cámara commanded the division with the title of "commodore" of the division.

Don Antonio de Ulloa was sent from the Philippines to the Caroline Islands in 1890 to counter threats by the German Empire to those Spanish-owned islands. Later that year she returned to the Philippines and was based there to replace her sister ship Gravina, which had been lost in a typhoon in 1884.

In December 1890, illness forced Cámara to relinquish command of the "Black Squadron." After his departure, Don Antonio de Ulloa stayed on in the Philippines. She took an active part in Spanish military action against Philippine insurgents during the "Tagalog Revolt" (1896–1897), the Spanish name for the first two years of the Philippine Revolution. Among her more notable contributions was the transportation of Spanish Army landing forces to Zamboanga in 1897.

Don Antonio de Ulloa′s machinery was in such bad condition by the spring of 1898 that it was removed to be overhauled. With her immobilized off Cavite in Manila Bay, her port battery was also removed for use in reinforcing shore batteries. She was left with only her starboard battery aboard, and only about half of her crew, which was enough to man that battery.

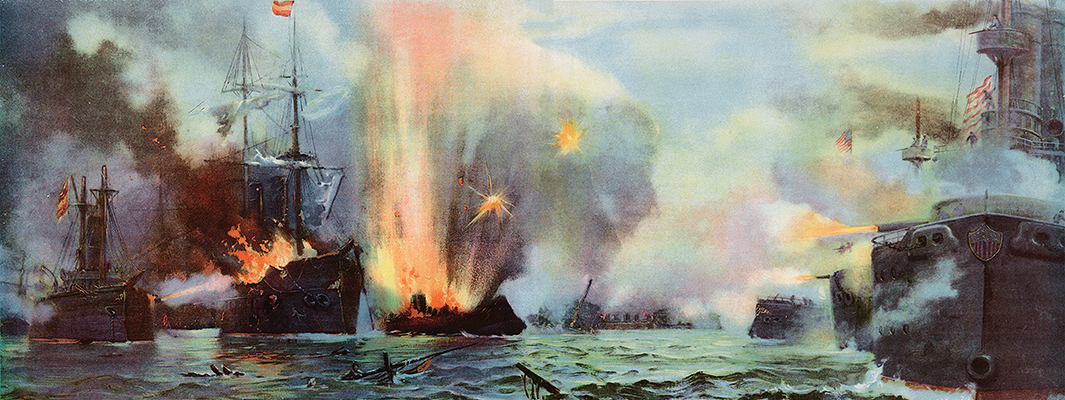
Don Antonio de Ulloa is at far left in this 1898 painting of the Battle of Manila Bay by J. G. Tyler.

She was in this condition when the Spanish–American War broke out in April 1898, and was anchored as part of the squadron of Rear Admiral Patricio Montojo y Pasarón in Manila Bay. Her anchorage was behind Sangley Point, where the Spanish hoped that the low, sandy point would provide some protection to her hull if the U.S. Navy attacked the anchorage.

The U.S. Navy's Asiatic Squadron under Commodore George Dewey did attack, early on the morning of 1 May 1898, making a series of slow firing passes at the Spanish squadron in the Battle of Manila Bay. During Dewey's first pass, Don Antonio de Ulloa took a few hits, the most destructive being a large shell that burst on the upper deck and killed nine men—among them her commanding officer—and wounded another ten, leaving almost no one aboard to man her remaining guns. There was also no one able to strike her colors; when Dewey's squadron reversed course and made a second firing pass, they assumed the still-flying battle ensign meant that Don Antonio de Ulloa was still in action. The U.S. squadron riddled the helpless ship, and she sank in shallow water; after the battle, her hull alone was found to have been holed by four 8-inch (203 mm), three 6-inch (152 mm), one 5-inch (127 mm), and 25 47 mm (1.9 in) and 37 mm (1.5 in) shells.

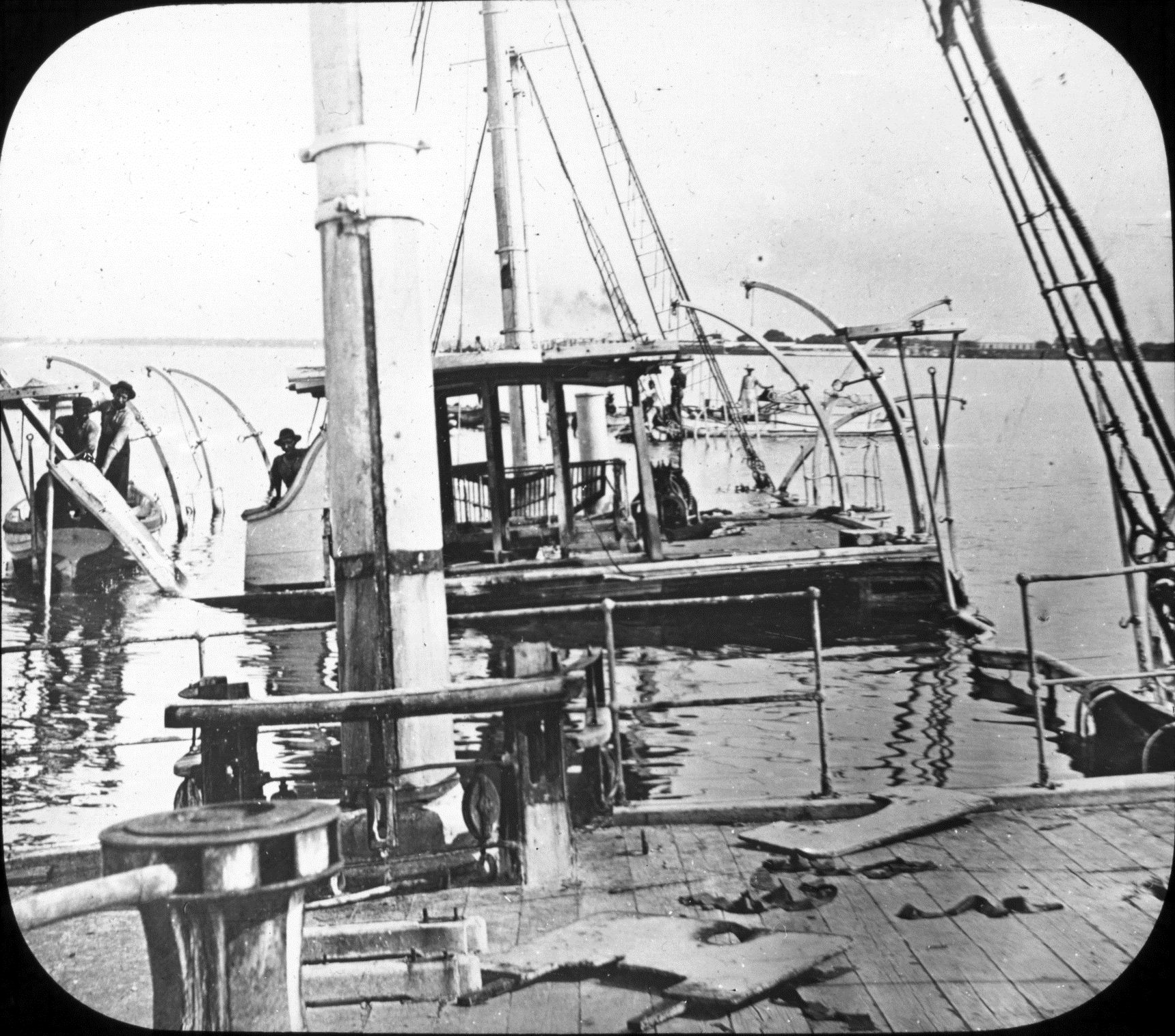
The wreck of Don Antonio de Ulloa.

After the battle, a boarding party from gunboat USS Petrel went aboard and set the wreck of Don Antonio de Ulloa on fire. Postwar, a U.S. Navy survey team found her to be beyond salvage, and her wreck was broken up for scrap.
