= Spanish cruiser Velasco =

Spanish Navy cruiser of 1882–1898

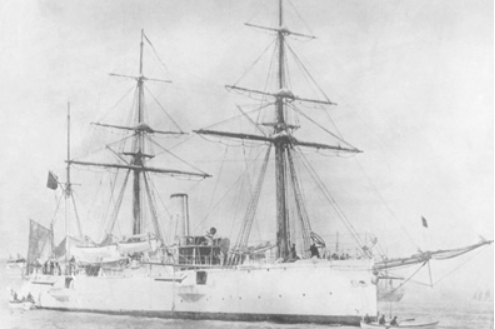

History

Spain
- Name: Velasco
- Namesake: Luis Vicente de Velasco (1711–1762), Spanish naval commander
- Ordered: 1880
- Builder: Thames Ironworks & Shipbuilding & Engineering Co. Ltd., Leamouth, London, England
- Launched: 27 August 1881
- Commissioned: 1882
- Fate: Sunk 1 May 1898

General characteristics
- Class & type: Velasco-class unprotected cruiser
- Displacement: 1,152 tons
- Length: 64.01 m (210 ft 0 in)
- Beam: 9.75 m (32 ft 0 in)
- Height: 5.33 m (17 ft 6 in)
- Draft: 4.17 m (13 ft 8 in) maximum
- Depth: 3.86 m (12 ft 8 in)
- Installed power: 1,500 ihp (1,100 kW)
- Propulsion: Horizontal compound steam engine, 4-cylinder boilers, one shaft, 200 to 220 tons coal (normal)
- Sail plan: Barque-rigged; 1,132 m^{2} (12,185 sq ft) of sail
- Speed: 13 knots (24 km/h; 15 mph)
- Complement: 173 officers and enlisted men
- Armament: 4 × 6 in (152 mm) guns; 2 × 3 in (76 mm) guns; 2 × machine guns; 2 × 14 in (356 mm) torpedo tubes

Velasco was a Velasco-class unprotected cruiser which entered service in the Spanish Navy in 1882. She operated in the Spanish East Indies, taking part in expeditions against the Jolo pirates in the Philippines and a rebellion on Ponape, as well as operations against Philippine rebels during the Philippine Revolution. She was sunk in the Battle of Manila Bay during the Spanish–American War in 1898.

== Characteristics and construction ==
Velasco was built as the lead ship of a new class of iron-hulled unprotected cruisers designed for colonial service in the Spanish Empire. The ships were barque-rigged, with three masts and a bowsprit, and had one rather tall funnel. Velasco and the next ship of the class, Gravina, both built in the United Kingdom, were differently armed and slightly faster than the final six ships of the class, all of which were built in Spain. Velasco and Gravina were the first Spanish warships to be painted white.

In 1880, the Spanish government signed a contract for the construction of Velasco with the Thames Ironworks & Shipbuilding & Engineering Co. Ltd. of Leamouth, London, in the United Kingdom. Her keel was laid in 1881 and she was launched on 27 August 1881. After fitting out and completion, she was delivered to the Spanish Navy.

== Operational history ==
=== 1880s ===
Velasco completed her delivery voyage to Spain with her arrival at Ferrol in March 1882. On 3 June 1882, she departed Spain for the Philippines.

On 26 October 1882, a Spanish squadron composed of Velasco, Gravina, the unprotected cruiser Aragón, the screw corvette Vencedora, the screw schooner Sirena, and the gunboats Arayak and Paragua 2, got underway from Manila for operations against the Jolo pirates, carrying a landing force consisting of 490 Spanish Marine Infantry personnel and naval infantrymen, 105 men of the Iberia Infantry Regiment, 111 men of the Jolo Infantry Regiment, and 100 men of a Manila disciplinary company. After the squadron reconnoitered the coast, fighting began when the landing force went ashore at Looc on 29 October 1882. On 30 October the Spanish force landed at Padang-Padang. After conducting several raids, the troops returned to the ships and landed at Boal on 8 November 1882. The squadron and troops returned to Manila in mid-November 1882.

Velasco, Vencedora, Sirena, and Arayak began another expedition against the Jolo pirates on 17 December 1882. With the consent of the Sultan of Jolo, the squadron occupied Tataan on Tawi-Tawi Island, located between Jolo and Bongao Island in an area with heavy pirate activity. The Spanish Navy established a naval station there.

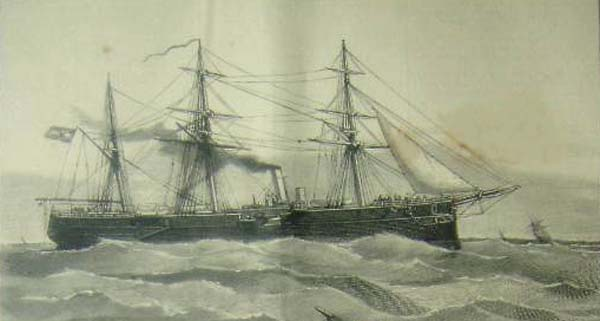
Velasco in an 1885 woodcut.

Velasco conducted a cruise in the Caroline Islands from January to March 1885. Spain considered the islands to be a part of the Spanish East Indies but had not actually occupied them, and Velasco′s cruise was intended to gather information to support an intended colonization of the islands as well as Spanish plans to establish two naval divisions there, based on Ponape in the Eastern Carolines and Yap in the Western Carolines. After Velasco returned to the Philippines, her commanding officer provided a report on the cruise and its findings to the commander of the naval base at Cavite on Luzon on 2 April 1885.

In January 1886 Velasco visited Hong Kong to have her boilers cleaned. In June 1886, she conducted another reconnaissance of the Caroline Islands in company with the steamer Manila. The cruise gathered information which confirmed the decision to establish two naval divisions in the islands.

=== 1890s ===
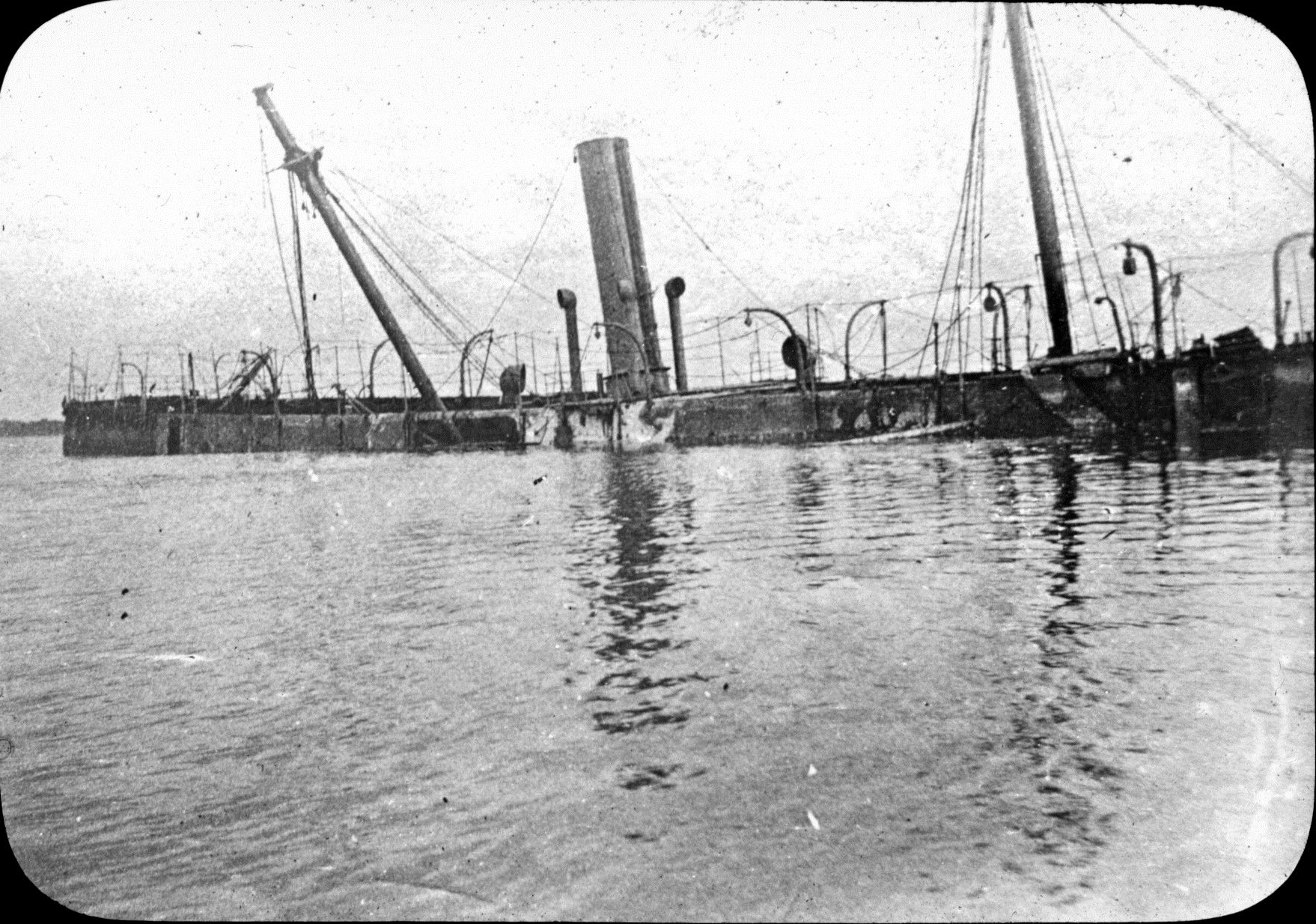
The wreck of Velasco after the Battle of Manila Bay in 1898

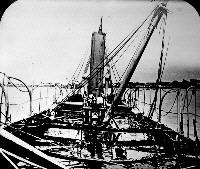
The view looking forward from the poop deck of the wreck of Velasco

On 25 June 1890, a group of natives attacked and killed an officer and 27 Spanish Army soldiers on Ponape. Velasco and the unprotected cruiser Don Antonio de Ulloa arrived at Ponape from Manila three months later, transporting a Spanish Army landing force of 500 soldiers and two field guns. Additional Spanish troops arrived days later. After the Spanish Army colonel commanding the landing force committed suicide, the commanding officer of Velasco took command of the operation. The Spanish force succeeded in putting down the rebellion by the end of 1890.

In 1891 Velasco conducted a patrol along the northern coast of Luzon and the neighboring Babuyan Islands to investigate and guard against activities of Japanese merchant ships the Spaniards viewed as suspicious.

The Philippine Revolution, known to the Spanish as the "Tagalog Revolt," began on 23 August 1896 with an uprising on Luzon in which Philippine rebels seized control of the Arsenal of Cavite. Velasco was at Manila and was one of the few Spanish warships available to respond to the revolt, which the Spanish did not put down until May 1897.

The Spanish–American War began when the United States declared war on Spain on 25 April 1898, stipulating that its declaration was retroactive to 21 April. At the time, Velasco was anchored in Manila Bay off the Cavite Peninsula as part of Rear Admiral Patricio Montojo y Pasaron's Pacific Squadron. Her boilers were ashore under repair, and all of her guns were removed and installed in the artillery battery on Caballo Island at the entrance to Manila Bay. She was so far from operational readiness that the Spaniards made no effort to get her ready for war service.

The United States Navy's Asiatic Squadron attacked Montojo's squadron on 1 May 1898 in the Battle of Manila Bay. At anchor off Cavite throughout the battle and lacking her guns, Velasco was unable to move or fire at the American ships and was sunk. During the battle, part of her crew served aboard the unprotected cruiser Reina Cristina, which also was sunk.
