= Spanish cruiser Don Juan de Austria =

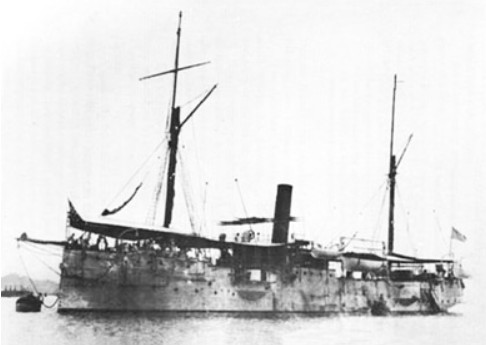

History

Spain
- Name: Don Juan de Austria
- Namesake: John of Austria
- Builder: Arsenal de Cartagena, Cartagena, Spain
- Laid down: 1883
- Launched: 23 January 1887
- Completed: 1888 or 1889
- Fate: Sunk 1 May 1898; captured and salvaged by U.S. Navy

General characteristics
- Class & type: Velasco-class unprotected cruiser
- Displacement: 1,152 tons
- Length: 210 ft 0 in (64.01 m)
- Beam: 32 ft 0 in (9.75 m)
- Draft: 13 ft 8 in (4.17 m) maximum
- Installed power: 1,500 ihp (1,100 kW)
- Propulsion: 1-shaft, horizontal compound, 4-cylinder boilers
- Sail plan: Barque-rigged
- Speed: 13 knots (24 km/h; 15 mph)
- Complement: 173 officers and enlisted
- Armament: 4 × 4.7-inch (119 mm) guns; 4 × 6 pdr guns; 1 × machine gun; 2 × 14 in (356 mm) torpedo tubes
- Notes: 200 to 220 tons of coal (normal)

Don Juan de Austria was a Velasco-class unprotected cruiser of the Spanish Navy that fought in the Battle of Manila Bay during the Spanish–American War.

== Technical characteristics ==
Don Juan de Austria was built at the Arsenal de Cartagena at Cartagena, Spain. Her keel was laid in 1883 and the ship was launched on 23 January 1887. The cruiser was completed in 1888 or 1889. She had one rather tall funnel. The vessel had an iron hull and was rigged as a barque.

== Operational history ==
On 7 March 1890, Capitán de navío (ship-of-the-line captain) Manuel de la Cámara took command of the Philippine Division, a naval force composed of Don Juan de Austria and the unprotected cruisers Castilla and Don Antonio de Ulloa designated to reinforce the Spanish Navy's Asiatic Squadron in the Philippines. The division departed Cádiz on 9 April 1890. Transiting the Mediterranean Sea, Suez Canal, and Indian Ocean, the division encountered rough weather during its journey only in the Gulf of Lyons. It called at Barcelona, Port Said, Suez, Aden, and Colombo before arriving at Singapore on 2 June 1890. The three cruisers resumed their voyage the next day and arrived at Manila on 17 June 1890. In the Philippines, the division became known as the "Black Squadron" because its ships were painted black instead of white, as other Asiatic Squadron ships were. Although a captain, Cámara commanded the division with the title of "commodore" of the division until December 1890, when illness forced him to relinquish command.

Don Juan de Austria remained in the Philippines after Cámara's departure. When the Spanish–American War broke out in April 1898, part of the Pacific Squadron of Rear Admiral Patricio Montojo y Pasarón in Manila Bay. At 1100 hours on 25 April 1898, Don Juan de Austria and five other ships of the squadron set out for Subic Bay, where Montojo hoped to take advantage of minefields and shore batteries in the likely event of an attack by U.S. Navy forces on his squadron. Arriving there, Montojo found that few of the mines had been laid and the shore batteries had not yet been mounted. At 1030 hours on 29 April 1898, Don Juan de Austria and Montojo's other ships departed Subic Bay to return to Manila Bay, where shore batteries could support Montojo's squadron and where the shallow water might reduce the loss of life if the Spanish ships were sunk. The squadron anchored later that day in Cañacao Bay off Sangley Point, in the lee of the Cavite Peninsula, about eight miles southeast of Manila. Don Juan de Austria made a quick trip to Manila to procure small craft, such as lighters, small boats, and barges, to be tied up alongside cruiser Castilla to protect her wooden hull from hostile gunfire.

When the U.S. Navy's Asiatic Squadron under Commodore George Dewey attacked, early on the morning of 1 May 1898 in the Battle of Manila Bay, Don Juan de Austria was at the extreme end of Montojo's line and at 0445 hours was the first Spanish ship to sight the approaching American warships. Dewey's squadron made a series of slow firing passes at the Spanish squadron.

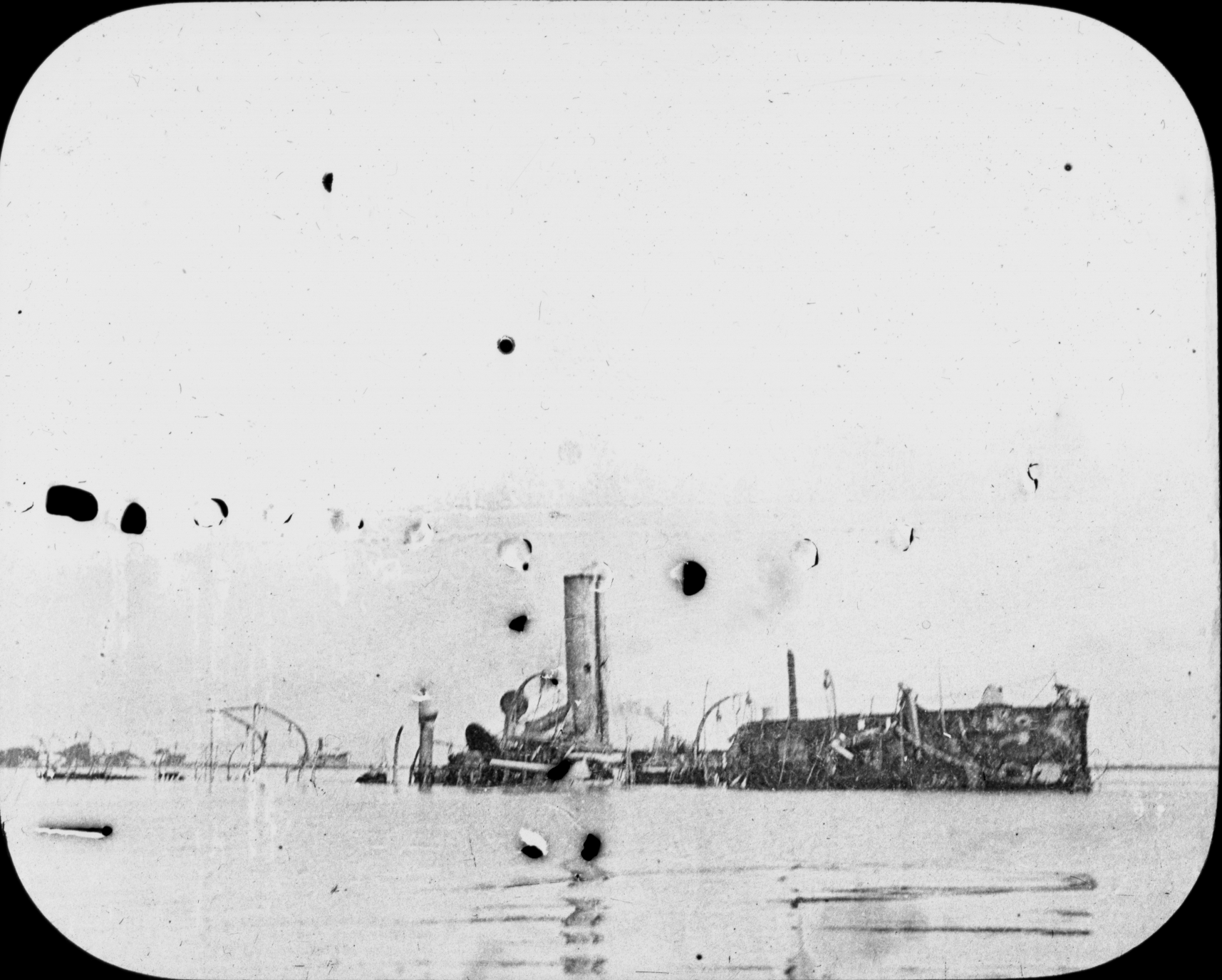
The wreck of Don Juan de Austria after the Battle of Manila Bay in 1898.

Don Juan de Austria got underway in an unsuccessful attempt to close with the American warships. Although suffering increasing damage as more and more American shells struck her, she came to the aid of Castilla when Castilla was burning out of control and had to be abandoned. When Montojo's flagship, unprotected cruiser Reina Cristina, also was knocked out of action, Dewey's squadron concentrated its fire on Don Juan de Austria. With her hull riddled and her steering wrecked, she was scuttled in shallow water, coming to rest on the bottom with her upper works above water. After the battle, a boarding party from gunboat USS Petrel went aboard and set the wreck of Don Juan de Austria on fire.

After the war, the U.S. Navy raised and salvaged Don Juan de Austria and commissioned her into the U.S. Navy in 1900 as gunboat USS Don Juan de Austria.
