= Spanish cruiser Conde de Venadito =

Velasco-class

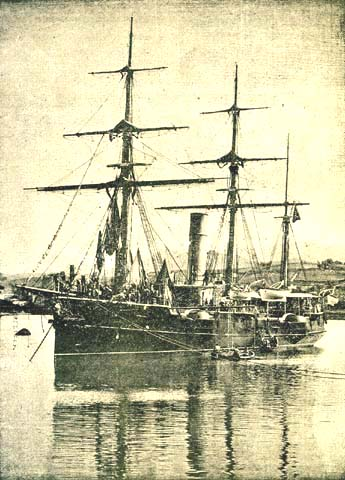
- Conde de Venadito in 1895

History

Spain
- Name: Conde de Venadito
- Namesake: Count of Venadito
- Builder: Naval shipyard Cartagena
- Laid down: 1883
- Launched: 15 August 1888
- Completed: 1888 or 1889
- Stricken: 1907
- Fate: Sunk as target 1936

General characteristics (as built)
- Class & type: Velasco-class unprotected cruiser
- Displacement: 1,190 long tons (1,210 t)
- Length: 210 ft (64 m)
- Beam: 32 ft (9.8 m)
- Draft: 13 ft 8 in (4.17 m) maximum
- Installed power: 1,500 hp (1,100 kW); 4 cylindrical boilers
- Propulsion: 1 shaft; 1 Compound-expansion steam engine
- Sail plan: barque-rigged
- Speed: 14 knots (26 km/h)
- Complement: 173 officers and enlisted men
- Armament: 4 × 4.7-inch (119 mm) guns; 4 × 6-pounder (57 mm) guns; 1 × machine gun; 2 × 14 in (356 mm) torpedo tubes
- Notes: Powered by 200–220 tonnes (220–240 short tons) of coal (normal)

Conde de Venadito was a Velasco-class unprotected cruiser of the Spanish Navy. It was built at the naval shipyard at Cartagena, Spain, in 1883, and was completed and launched five years later. In 1895, she unsuccessfully attempted to sink the American merchant ship Allianca off Cape Maisi, Cuba, under the suspicion that she was smuggling arms to the Cuban insurgents. She was stricken from the register in 1907 and was finally sunk in 1936 as a target ship.

== Construction and design ==
Conde de Venadito was built at the naval shipyard at Cartagena, Spain. Her keel was laid in 1883, she was launched on 15 August 1888, and she was completed in 1888 or 1889. The vessel displaced 1,190 long tons (1,210 t) of water and was 210 ft (64 m) long (length between perpendiculars) with a 32 ft (9.8 m) beam, while still maintaining a draft of 13 ft 8 in (4.17 m). She was powered by one-shaft, horizontal compound, four-cylindrical boilers (normally containing 200–220 tonnes (220–240 short tons) of coal), which helped her reach a speed of 14 knots (26 km/h). Her armament consisted of four 4.7-inch (119 mm) guns, four 6-pounder (57 mm) guns, one machine gun and two 14 in (356 mm) torpedo tubes operated by a crew of 173 officers and enlisted men. She had one rather tall funnel, an iron hull and was rigged as a barque.

== Service history ==
She participated in the quadcentennial of Christopher Columbus's discovery of the "New World". The royal family of the United Kingdom used the ship for the large reception. The Monday after the celebration (at 8 AM), when the ships of other nations were leaving, the ship with the royal family passed the line of ships as they waved goodbye. During 1894, she was part of the "training and evolutionary" squadron of the Spanish navy, which was located off the cost of Cuba, which was announced by the Spanish Minister of Marine earlier that year.

=== Allianca incident ===
In March 1895, Conde de Venadito was involved in an incident with the American merchant ship Allianca off Cape Maisí, Cuba. The Spanish ship attempted to stop Allianca for search on suspicion of filibustering, or smuggling arms to the insurgents in Cuba. The American ship failing to stop, the Spanish vessel fired several solid shots at the merchant ship during an unsuccessful chase of about 20 miles (32 km). This touched off much sensational reporting in the American press and is credited by many with crystallizing anti-Spanish sentiment in the American public in the years preceding the Spanish–American War.

=== Spanish–American War ===
In the Spanish–American War Conde de Venadito was first recorded at the port of Santiago de Cuba on 20 April. She first saw real action in the war when defending Havana. She first steamed out of the harbor alongside Nueva España on 14 May at 4:20 PM. She manovered in reaction to the U.S. gunboats, while firing two shots 17 km (11 mi) from the U.S. ships, which retreated to 20 km (12 mi) from her. She and Nueva España retreated with Aguila and Flecha at dusk. At night, the U.S. vessels occupied the harbor. Whether the shots had any effect is not known, due to the distance from which they were fired.

On 10 June at 8:30 AM, the Conde de Venadito, Nueva España, Flecha, and the Yanéz Pinzon, appeared 1 km (0.62 mi) offshore, and soon fired at Battery No. 1. from 3.8 km (2.4 mi). The U.S. vessels started firing at the four ships from a distance of 10 km (6.2 mi). The fire was accurate at first, until the four Spanish boats backed up to 15 km (9.3 mi) from the U.S. ships, and, at 1:30 PM, the U.S. ships entered the harbor.

=== Fate ===
She was stricken from the register in 1907. Her hull was later sunk as a target ship in 1936.
