= Gonzalez Hontoria de 12 cm mod 1883 =

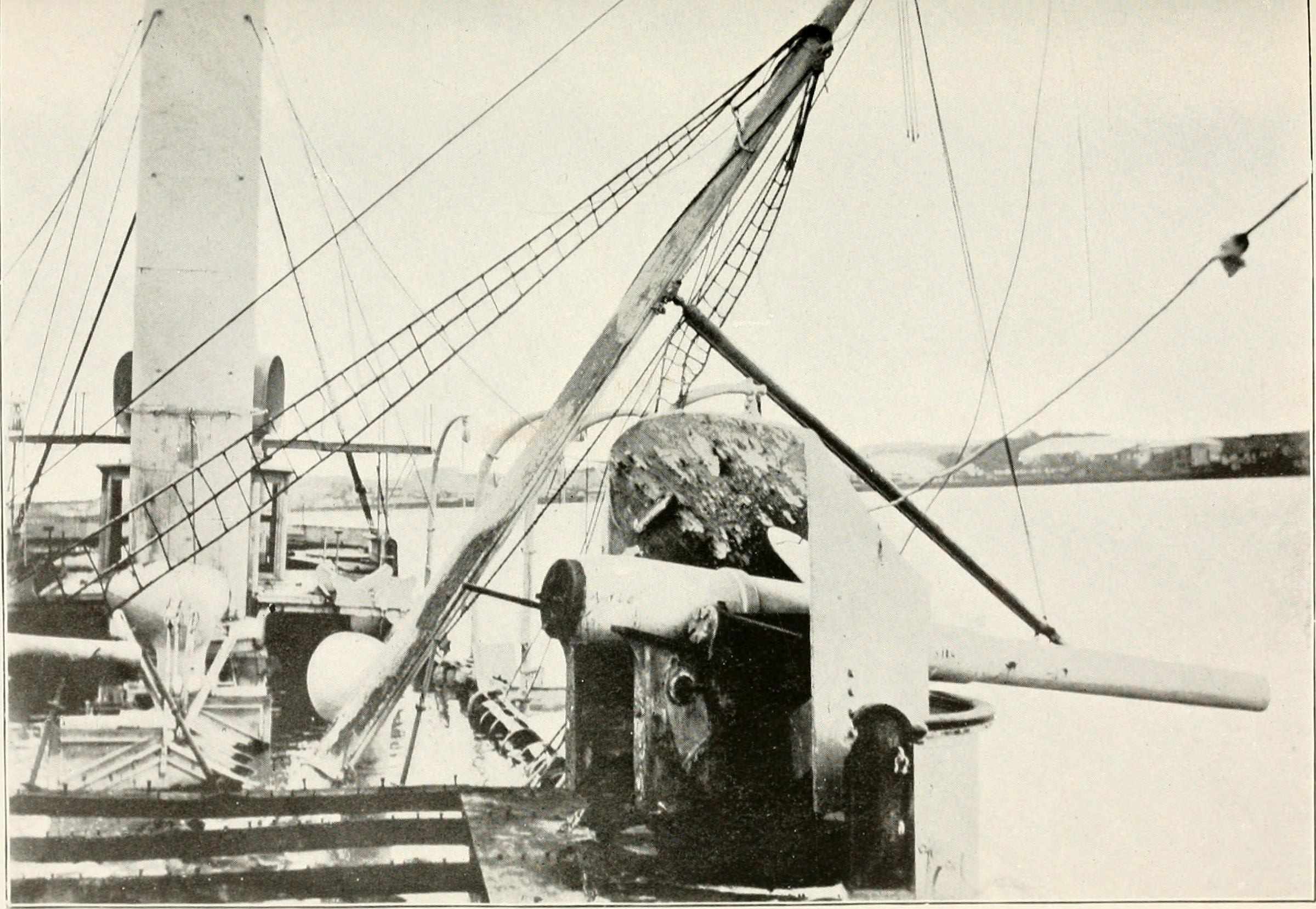
- A 12 cm Hontoria 1883 gun aboard the Spanish protected cruiser Isla de Cuba
- Type: Naval gun Coastal artillery
- Place of origin: Spain

Service history
- In service: 1886-1930
- Used by: Spain
- Wars: Spanish–American War

Production history
- Designed: 1883
- Produced: 1886

Specifications
- Mass: 2.6 t (2.9 short tons)
- Length: 4.4 m (14 ft 5 in)
- Barrel length: 4.2 m (13 ft 9 in) 35 caliber
- Height: 2.5 m (8 ft 2 in)
- Shell: Separate loading 13 kg (29 lb) smokeless powder bagged charge and projectile
- Shell weight: 24 kg (53 lb)
- Caliber: 120 mm (4.7 in)
- Breech: Interrupted screw
- Muzzle velocity: 612 m/s (2,010 ft/s)
- Maximum firing range: 10 km (6.2 mi) at +25°

The Gonzalez Hontoria de 12 cm mod 1883 was a Spanish naval gun developed in the late 1800s that armed a variety of warships of the Spanish Navy during the Spanish–American War.

== History ==
The Hontoria guns were designed by José González Hontoria a Spanish inventor, field marshal of marine infantry and brigadier of the navy. During the 1800s Spain lagged behind other European powers in industrialization and Spain imported weapons from Krupp, Armstrong Whitworth and Schneider et Cie. During the 1860s and 1870s, Hontoria studied explosives, metallurgy, and industrial production with the aim of developing an indigenous arms industry.

== Construction ==
In 1879 Hontoria designed a series of naval guns ranging from 20 cm (7.9 in) to 7 cm (2.8 in) which would lay the foundation for his later guns. The 1879 series like Ordóñez guns of the same period were breech loading, black powder, built up guns, with steel A tube and cast iron reinforcing hoops. The 1883 series was a step forward in that they were breech loading, built up guns, with forged steel A tube and forged steel reinforcing hoops. The Hontoria 1883 series ranged in size from 32 cm (12.6 in) to 12 cm (4.7 in) and were 35 calibers in length. They were produced by the Arsenal de La Carraca in San Fernando in Cádiz and the Royal Ordnance Works at Trubia in Asturias. During the 1890s some 12 cm, 14 cm (5.5 in) and 16 cm (6.3 in) guns were converted to quick-firing guns with assistance from Schneider et Cie.

Criticisms of the 1883 series guns:

- Outdated design - Some argue that the 1883 series production methods were outdated compared to its European rivals. The counter argument is Spain only recently switched to producing steel weapons and purchasing a foreign design would do nothing to promote self-sufficiency in weapons design and production. Also that the cost of retooling to produce another design would have meant that recent infrastructure improvements were a wasted investment.
- Slow rate of fire - Some argue that the 1883 series should have been designed as quick firing weapons from the beginning and that attempts to convert them to quick firing were unsuccessful. The counter argument is that Spain didn't have that experience and it would have meant delaying production schedules when they were already delayed due to insufficient industrial capacity.
- Short barrel length - Some argue that the 35-caliber length was too short when compared to its European rivals who were producing 45-caliber guns and that the short barrel length did not leverage the power of new smokeless powders efficiently. The counterargument is that Spanish industry did not have the capacity to produce longer barrels, having only recently switched to steel production and that the powders of the time needed reformulation to increase efficiency and increasing barrel length was only a partial fix.

== Naval use ==
Gonzalez Hontoria de 12 cm mod 1883 guns armed a variety of ships such as ironclads, protected cruisers, torpedo gunboats and unprotected cruisers of the Spanish Navy.

=== Ironclad battleships ===
- Pelayo — This ship had a tertiary armament of twelve casemated 12 cm guns in single mounts amidships. Pelayo saw no action during the Spanish–American War.

=== Protected cruisers ===
- Isla de Luzon-class — The three ships of this class had a primary armament of six 12 cm guns in single shielded mounts. Two were mounted forward, two amidships, and two aft. Two ships of this class, Isla de Cuba and Isla de Luzón, were scuttled in the Battle of Manila Bay during the Spanish–American War and later raised, repaired, and commissioned into the United States Navy under their Spanish names.
- Reina Regente-class — The three ships of this class had a secondary armament of six 12 cm guns in sponsons amidships.

=== Torpedo gunboats ===
- Maria de Molina class - The three ships of this class had a primary armament of two 12 cm guns in single shielded mounts fore and aft of the superstructure.
- Temerario class - The six ships of this class had a primary armament of two 12 cm guns in single shielded mounts fore and aft of the superstructure.

=== Unprotected cruisers ===
- Velasco-class — Six of the eight ships of this class had a primary armament of four 12 cm guns in single shielded mounts amidships. Three ships of this class (Don Antonio de Ulloa, Don Juan de Austria, and Velasco) were sunk in the Battle of Manila Bay during the Spanish–American War. Don Juan de Austria was raised, repaired and commissioned into the U.S. Navy under her Spanish name.

== Ammunition ==
The gun used separate loading, bagged smokeless powder charges weighing 13 kg (29 lb) and projectiles which weighed 24 kg (53 lb). The gun could fire arrmor-piercing and common rounds.

== Photo gallery ==
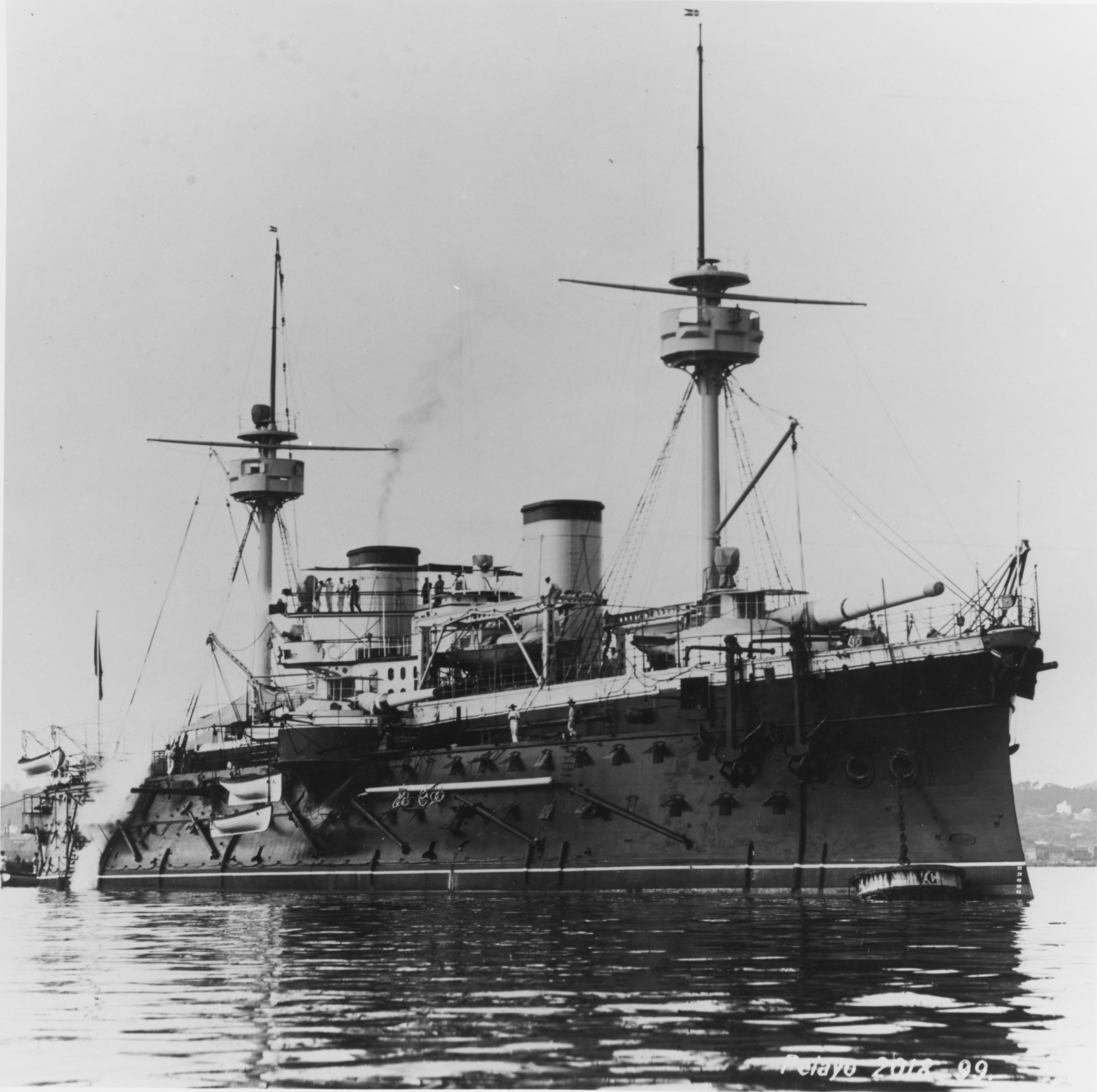
The Spanish battleship Pelayo

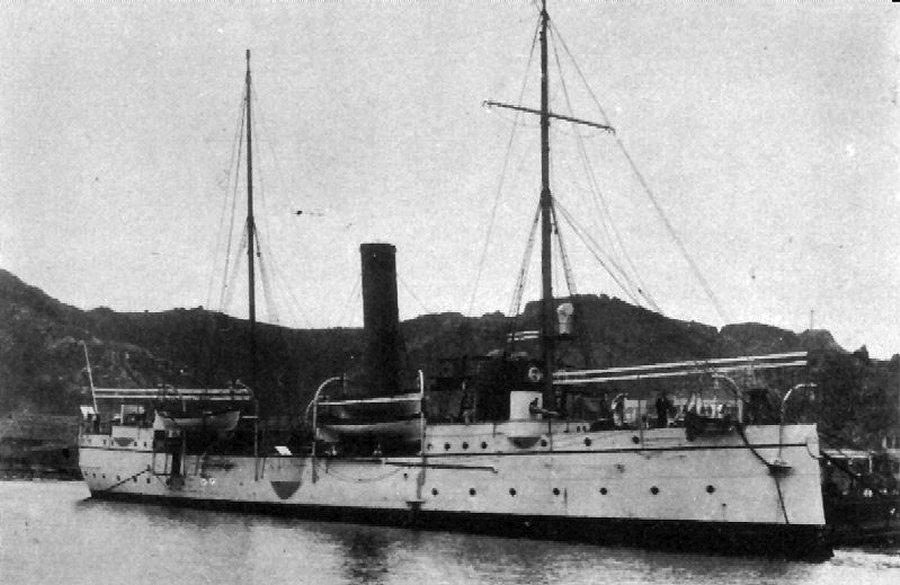
The war prize USS Isla de Luzon

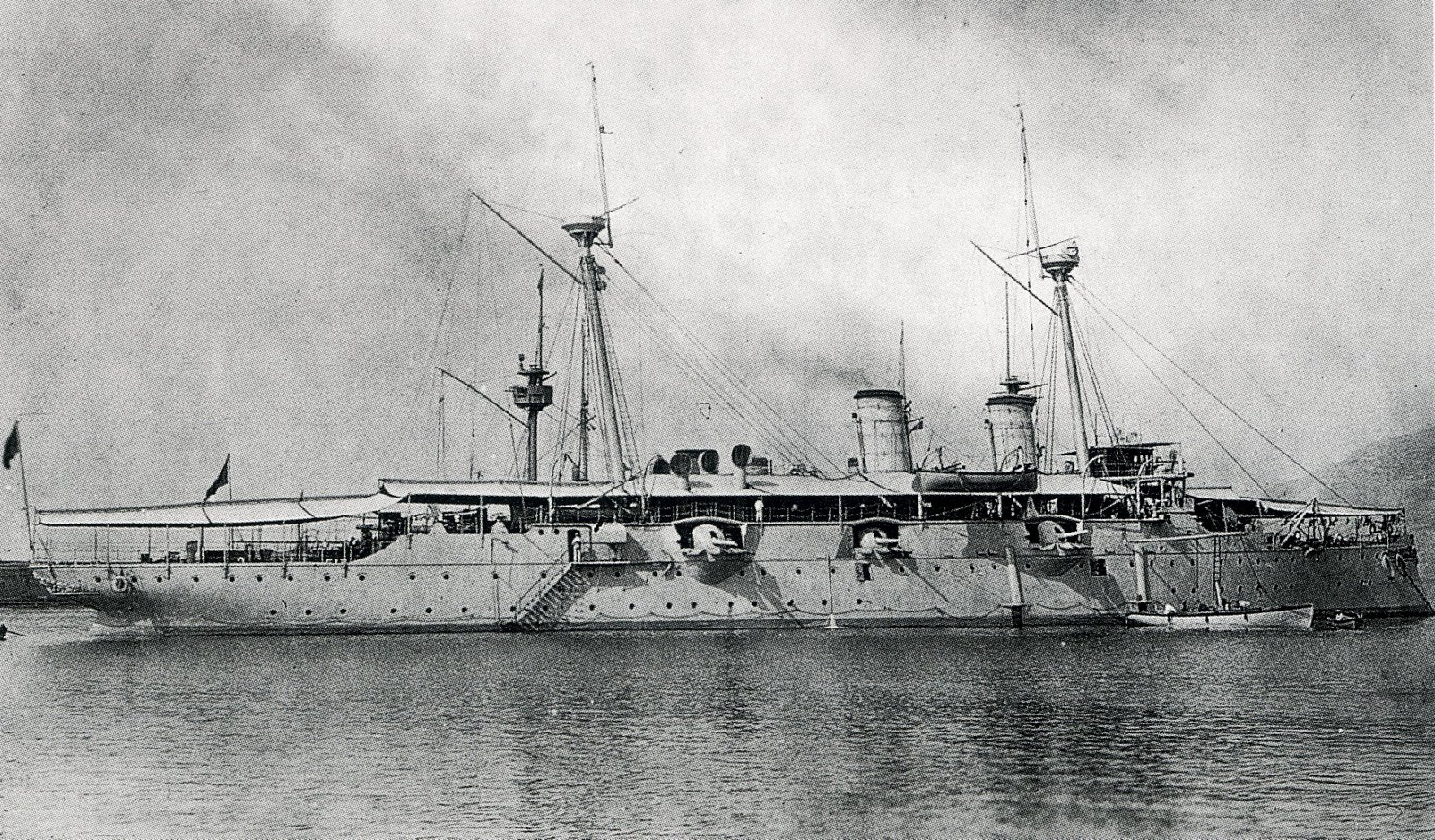
The Spanish protected cruiser Lepanto

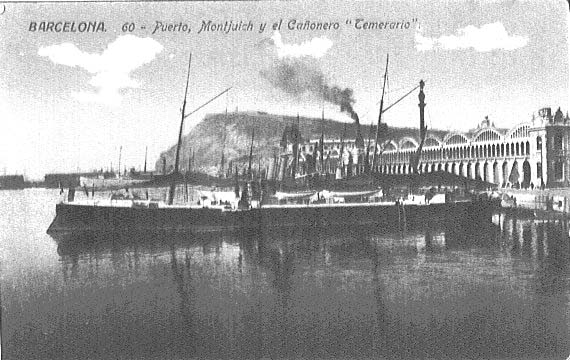
The torpedo gunboat Temerario

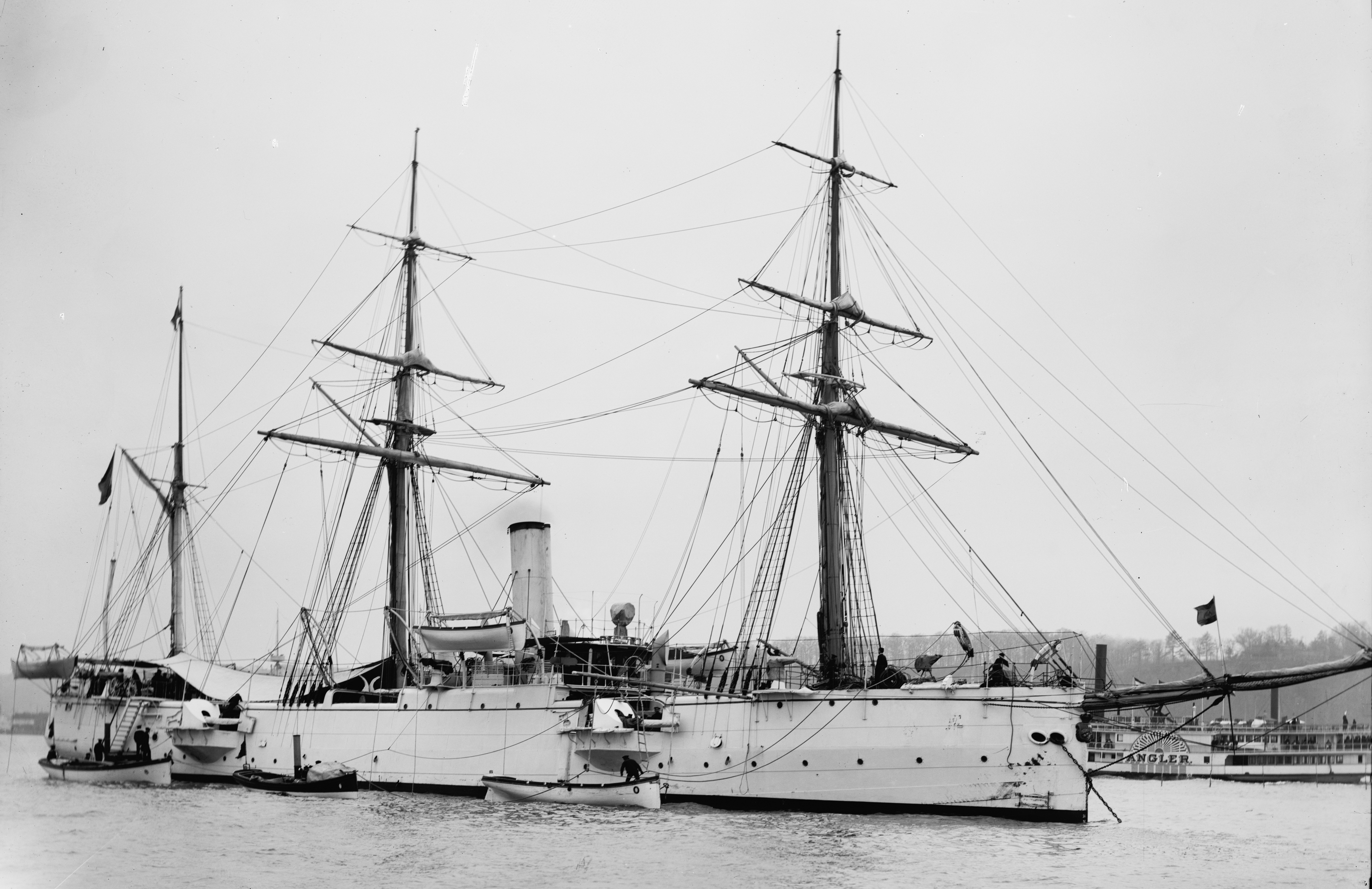
A Velasco-class unprotected cruiser
