= Velasco-class cruiser =

Spanish Navy Cruisers

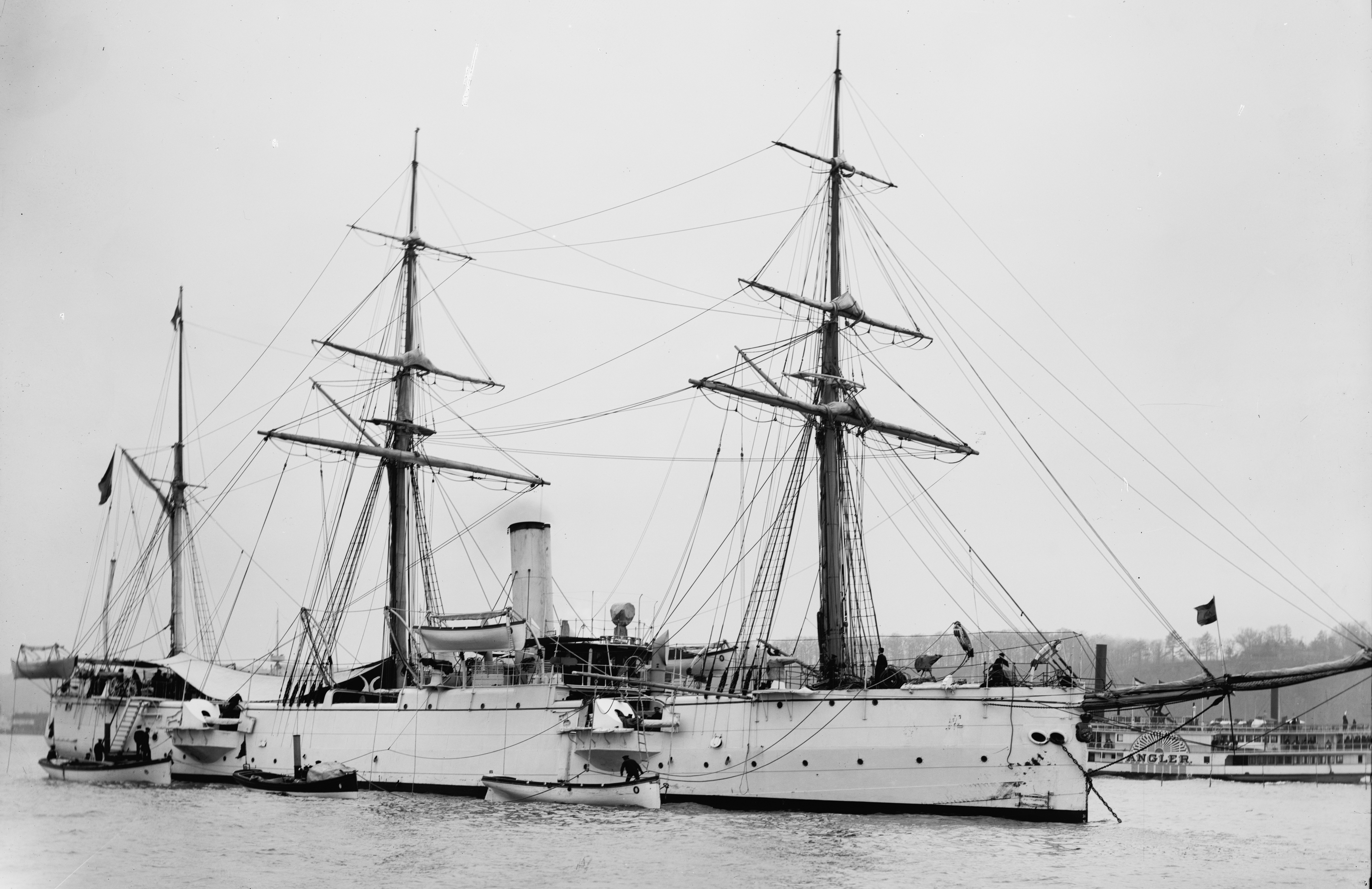
- An unidentified Velasco-class (here called "Infanta Isabel-class") cruiser in U.S. waters during the 1880s or 1890s

Class overview
- Name: Velasco
- Builders: Thames Ironworks & Shipbuilding & Engineering Co. Ltd. Leamouth, London, United Kingdom; Cádiz, Cartagena, and Ferrol, Spain
- Built: 1881–1889
- In commission: 1881–1927
- Planned: 8
- Completed: 8
- Lost: 5
- Retired: 3

General characteristics
- Class & type: Velasco
- Type: unprotected cruiser
- Displacement: 1,152 tons
- Length: 210 ft (64 m)
- Beam: 32 ft (9.8 m)
- Draft: 13 ft 8 in (4.17 m) maximum
- Sail plan: barque-rigged
- Speed: 13 knots (24 km/h)
- Complement: 173; Infanta Isabel 194 by 1921.
- Armament: Velasco and Gravina: 2 × 6-inch (152 mm) guns; 2 × 3-inch (76 mm) guns; 2 × machine guns; 2 × 14-inch (356 mm) torpedo tubes; Others as built: 4 × 120-millimetre (4.7 in) guns; 4 × 57 mm 6-pounder guns; 1 × machine gun; 2 × 14-inch (356 mm) torpedo tubes; Infanta Isabel by 1921: 1 × 66 mm gun; 10 × 57 mm 6-pounder guns
- Armor: none
- Notes: 200 to 220 tons of coal (normal)

The Velasco class of unprotected cruisers was a series of eight cruisers built during the 1880s for service with the Spanish Navy. They were named after Luis Vicente de Velasco.

== Description ==
The Velasco class consisted of two slightly different subclasses. The first two ships, Velasco and Gravina, built by the Thames Ironworks & Shipbuilding & Engineering Co. Ltd. at Leamouth, London in the United Kingdom, had fewer but heavier guns and were slightly faster than the next six, which were built at various yards in Spain. The class took a long time to complete, with the two British-build ships being laid down in 1881 and the last Spanish built one not being completed until 1889. The ships had one rather tall funnel, an iron hull, and barque rigging. They were unarmored.

== History ==
The Velasco-class cruisers generally were assigned to colonial service. They were an ill-fated class, with two lost at sea and three more sunk during the Spanish–American War. The three survivors lasted into the early 20th century, with the last one stricken in 1927.

== Ships in class ==
=== Velasco ===
Completed in 1881, Velasco was in the Philippines at the outbreak of the Spanish–American War in April 1898 and was sunk in the Battle of Manila Bay on 1 May 1898.

=== Gravina ===
Completed in 1881, Gravina was sent to the Philippines, where she sank in a typhoon in 1884.

=== Infanta Isabel ===
Completed in 1885, Infanta Isabel was the longest lived of the class, undergoing a reconstruction in 1911 and not being stricken until 1927.

=== Isabel II ===
Completed in 1887, Isabel II saw action during the Spanish–American War in the Second and Third Battles of San Juan, and was stricken in 1907.

=== Cristóbal Colón ===
Completed in 1889, Cristóbal Colón was lost off Cuba in October 1895.

=== Don Juan de Austria ===
Completed in 1887, Don Juan de Austria was in the Philippines at the outbreak of the Spanish–American War in April 1898 and was sunk in the Battle of Manila Bay on 1 May 1898. Salvaged, repaired and in 1900 commissioned into American Navy.

=== Don Antonio de Ulloa ===
Completed in 1886, Don Antonio de Ulloa was in the Philippines at the outbreak of the Spanish–American War in April 1898 and was sunk in the Battle of Manila Bay on 1 May 1898.

=== Conde del Venadito ===
Completed in 1888, Conde del Venadito was stricken around 1905
