= Spanish cruiser Gravina =

Spanish cruiser of 1881–1884

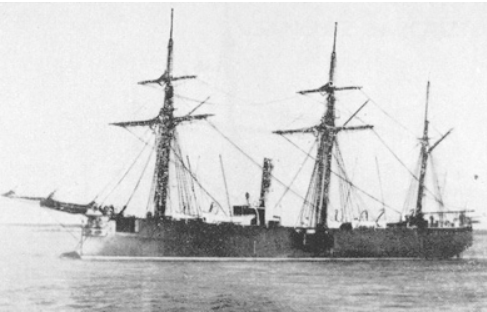

History

Spain
- Name: Gravina
- Namesake: Federico Carlos Gravina y Nápoli (1756–1806), Italian-Spanish admiral
- Awarded: 1880
- Builder: Thames Ironworks & Shipbuilding & Engineering Co. Ltd., Leamouth, London, England
- Laid down: 1881
- Launched: 27 July 1881
- Completed: 1881
- Fate: Wrecked 10 July 1884

General characteristics
- Class & type: Velasco-class unprotected cruiser
- Displacement: 1,152 tons
- Length: 64.01 m (210 ft 0 in)
- Beam: 9.75 m (32 ft 0 in)
- Height: 5.33 m (17 ft 6 in)
- Draft: 4.17 m (13 ft 8 in) maximum
- Depth: 3.86 m (12 ft 8 in)
- Installed power: 1,500 ihp (1,119 kW)
- Propulsion: 1-shaft, horizontal compound, 4-cylinder boilers, 200 to 220 tons coal (normal)
- Sail plan: Barque-rigged; 1,132 m^{2} (12,185 sq ft) of sail
- Speed: 13 knots (24 km/h; 15 mph)
- Range: 2,000 nmi (3,700 km; 2,300 mi)
- Complement: 173 officers and enlisted men
- Armament: 4 × 6 in (152 mm) guns; 2 × 3 in (76 mm) guns; 2 × machine guns; 2 × 14 in (356 mm) torpedo tubes

Gravina was a Velasco-class unprotected cruiser of the Spanish Navy in service from 1881 to 1884. She operated in the Philippines, taking part in the Spanish-Moro conflict, until she was wrecked in a typhoon in 1884.

== Characteristics and construction ==
Gravina was an iron-hulled unprotected cruiser designed for colonial service in the Spanish Empire. She was barque-rigged, with three masts and a bowsprit, and she had one rather tall funnel. She and the lead ship of the class, Velasco, both built in the United Kingdom, were differently armed and slightly faster than the final six ships of the class, all of which were built in Spain. Gravina and Velasco were the first Spanish warships to be painted white.

In 1880, the Spanish government signed a contract for the construction of Gravina with the Thames Ironworks & Shipbuilding & Engineering Co. Ltd. of Leamouth, London, in the United Kingdom. Her keel was laid in 1881, and she was launched on 27 July 1881. After her completion, she was delivered to the Spanish Navy later in 1881.

== Operational history ==
Gravina completed her delivery voyage to Spain with her arrival at Ferrol at the end of 1881. She departed Ferrol on 2 January 1882 and, after a stop at Cartagena, deployed to the Philippines.

On 26 October 1882, a Spanish squadron composed of Gravina, Velasco, the unprotected cruiser Aragón, the screw corvette Vencedora, the screw schooner Sirena, and the gunboats Arayak and Paragua 2 got underway from Manila for operations against the Jolo pirates, carrying a landing force consisting of 490 Spanish Marine Infantry personnel and naval infantrymen, 105 men of the Iberia Infantry Regiment, 111 men of the Jolo Infantry Regiment, and 100 men of a Manila disciplinary company. After the squadron reconnoitered the coast, fighting began when the landing force went ashore at Looc on 29 October 1882. On 30 October the Spanish force landed at Padang-Padang. After conducting several raids, the troops returned to the ships and landed at Boal on 8 November 1882. The squadron and troops returned to Manila in mid-November 1882.

Gravina, Aragón, Vencedora, Sirena, and Paragua 2 mounted another expedition against pirates in Jolo in November 1883. On 7 November, the ships bombarded Looc and the vicinity of Tapucan and Panlau-Panlau, then landed a force composed of two companies of Spanish Army soldiers totaling 810 men, a disciplinary company of 150 men, 70 convicts, Spanish marine infantrymen, and 400 sailors from the ships' crews. On 8 November the Spanish operations expanded to Boad. The Spanish force suffered two dead and 10 wounded. After reembarking the landing force, the ships returned to Zamboanga on 9 November 1883.

On 8 July 1884, Gravina departed Manila bound for Shanghai, China. During the voyage, she encountered a typhoon and was wrecked on Fuga Island in the Babuyan Islands north of Luzon on 10 July 1884 with the loss of nine lives — two officers (an ensign and a midshipman) and seven enlisted men. In a subsequent court martial her commanding officer, Capitán de fragata (Frigate Captain) José García de Quesada, was absolved of wrongdoing in her loss.
