= Unprotected cruiser =

Type of naval warship used around the year 1870

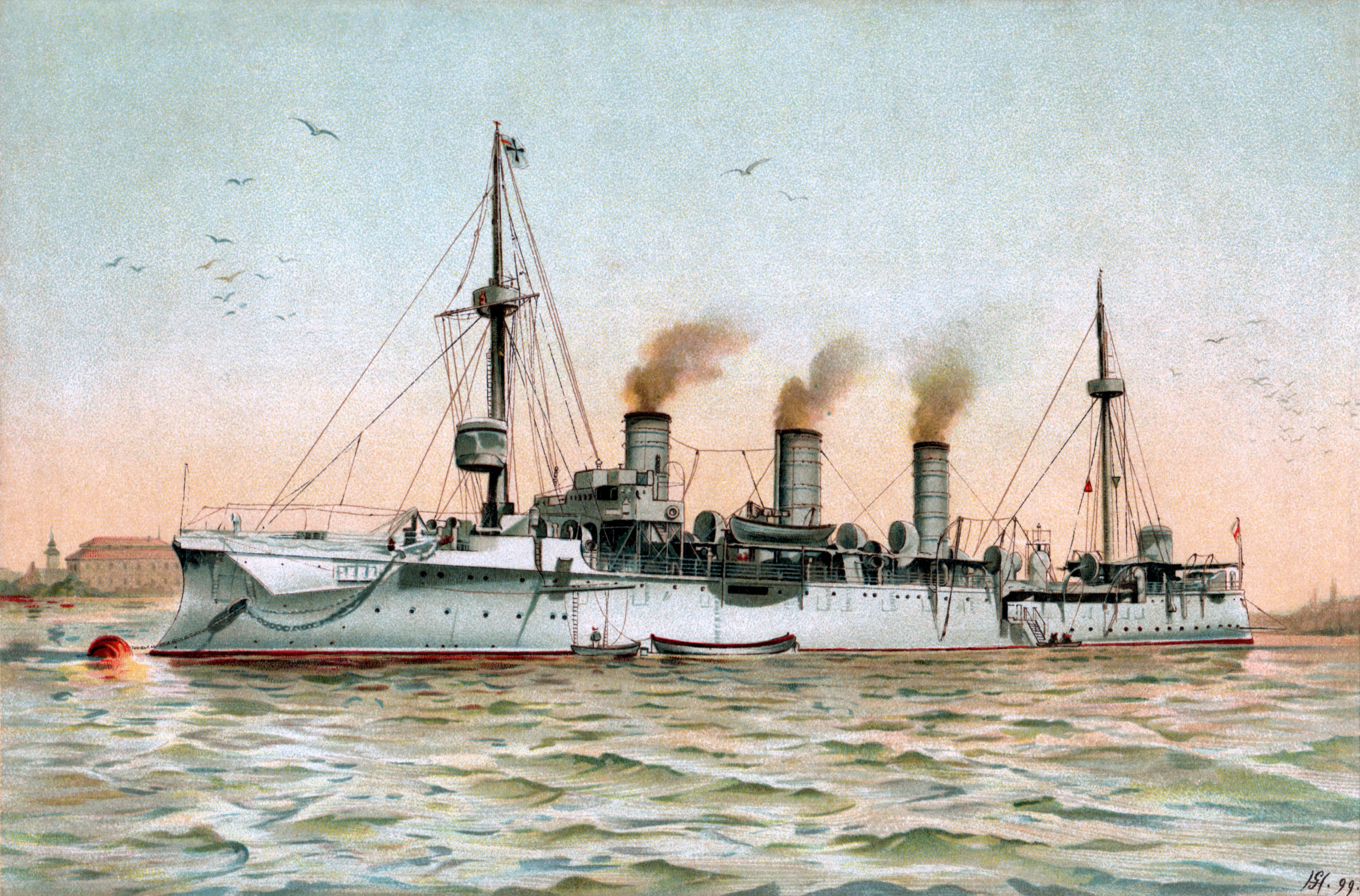
SMS Gefion was an unprotected cruiser that had a thin protective deck; she served with the Imperial German Navy between 1895 and 1919.

An unprotected cruiser was a type of naval warship that was in use during the early 1870s Victorian or pre-dreadnought era (about 1880 to 1905). The name was meant to distinguish these ships from “protected cruisers”, which had become accepted in the 1880s. A protected cruiser did not have side armor on its hull like a battleship or “armored cruiser” but had only a curved armored deck built inside the ship — like an internal turtle shell — which prevented enemy fire penetrating through the ship down into the most critical areas such as machinery, boilers, and ammunition storage. An unprotected cruiser lacked even this level of internal protection. The definitions had some gray areas, because individual ships could be built with a protective deck that did not cover more than a small area of the ship, or was so thin as to be of little value. The same was true of the side armor on some armored cruisers. An unprotected cruiser was generally cheaper and less effective than a protected cruiser, while a protected cruiser was generally cheaper and less effective than an armored cruiser, with some exceptions in each case.

== Examples ==
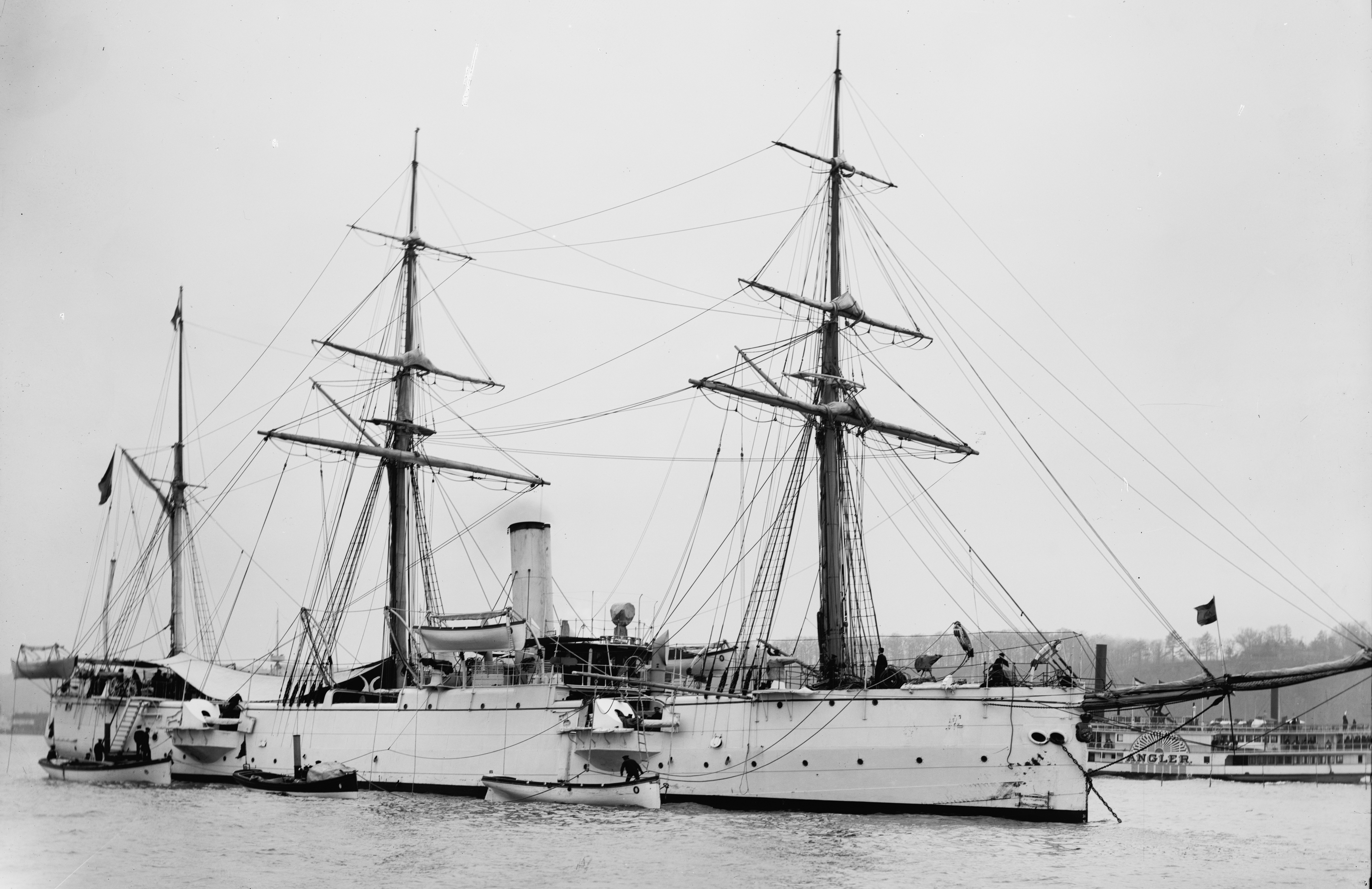
Spanish Infanta Isabel in New York, May 1893

Unprotected cruisers included medium-sized ships such as the Spanish Reina Cristina and Chinese Kai Che down to smaller ships of about 1,000 displacement tons. A small unprotected cruiser was little different from a large gunboat (for instance, at the Battle of Manila Bay in 1898 the American Concord was larger than the Spanish unprotected cruisers of the Velasco class, and was equivalent to a small British protected cruiser, but the United States Navy classified Concord as only a gunboat.) Such ships could be known by alternate names depending on the preference of each navy. For instance, the British Royal Navy tended to refer to larger gunboats and small cruisers as “sloops”.

The designation “unprotected” made sense only after the development of protected cruisers in the 1880s. Many ships designed earlier had essentially the same features and size range; for instance, the Spanish Castilla, the French Lapérouse and the Dutch Atjeh-class ships were also to be called unprotected cruisers. Steel-hulled cruisers had been preceded by iron-hulled (but not armored) ships and composite (iron and wood)-hulled ships, which were originally termed cruisers, frigates, or corvettes. Most of these ships retained sailing rig and were useful for colonial duties, where dockyards and coal supplies were often inadequate. Some of these older ships were fairly large, for instance HMS Shah.

The cruisers meant for colonial duty, like gunboats, were not built for high speed. The French unprotected cruiser Milan (1885) was distinct in appearance and role, with the recognition that cruisers were more useful as scouts and commerce raiders if they were faster than ironclad battleships. In the 1880s and 1890s fast, small unarmored cruisers could also be listed as “avisos”, “dispatch boats” (if the ship was fast enough to be useful for carrying messages, in the era before Wireless), or “torpedo cruisers” (a term derived from “torpedo gunboats”, again the distinction being mainly of larger size). Different contemporary reference works may use more than one of these terms for the same ship.

== Decline ==
All of these terms faded from use because the design of these ships became obsolete. By World War I, there was no need to produce unprotected cruisers since fast light cruisers could be given not only protective decks but side armor (over the pre-dreadnought era, effective armor could be made thinner with less weight due to advances in steelworking technology). The speed and firepower difference between even a small light cruiser and a gunboat had made these categories permanently distinct. Wireless technology had eliminated message-carrying roles, and specialized torpedo craft were made much lighter and faster (destroyers). When discarded terms such as “sloop”, “frigate” and “corvette” were used again, it was for small anti-submarine convoy escort craft.

=== Peace cruisers ===
The U.S. Navy continued to use unprotected cruisers for a few years after World War I, often referring to them (and to obsolete protected cruisers and some large gunboats without cruiser features) as peace cruisers due to their use in major policing and diplomatic roles.

== See also ==
- List of unprotected cruisers of Germany
