= Spanish cruiser Alfonso XII =

Spanish cruiser of 1891–1900

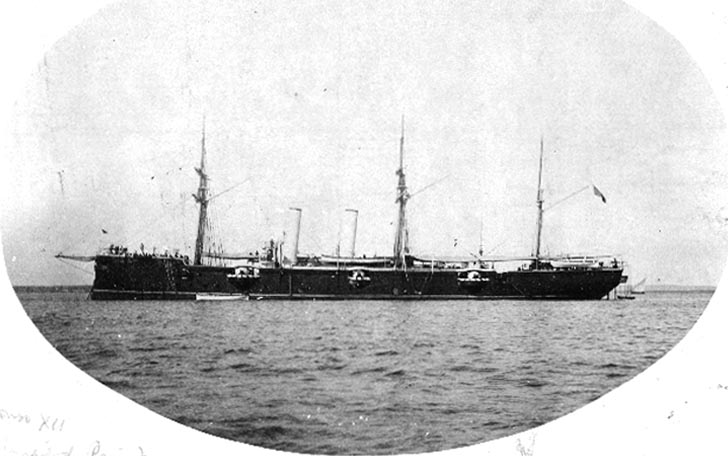
- Alfonso XII during the 1890s.

History

Spain
- Name: Alfonso XII
- Namesake: Alfonso XII (1857–1885), King of Spain (1874–1885)
- Ordered: 14 October 1880
- Builder: Ferrol, Spain
- Laid down: 12 August 1881
- Launched: 21 August or 21 September 1887
- Commissioned: 1891
- Decommissioned: 1900
- Fate: Disarmed 1900; Stricken 1904; Sold and scrapped 1907

General characteristics
- Class & type: Alfonso XII-class cruiser
- Displacement: 3,042 tons
- Length: 278 ft 3 in (84.81 m)
- Beam: 43 ft 4 in (13.21 m)
- Draft: 20 ft 0 in (6.10 m)
- Installed power: 4,400 ihp (3,300 kW)
- Propulsion: 1-shaft compound
- Speed: 17 kn (31 km/h; 20 mph) (designed)
- Endurance: 500 tons coal (normal); 720 tons coal (maximum)
- Complement: 370 officers and enlisted
- Armament: 6 × 160 mm (6 in) guns; 8 × 6 pdr Hotchkiss QF guns; 6 × 3 pdr Hotchkiss revolvers; 5 × 14 in (356 mm) torpedo tubes

Alfonso XII, was an Alfonso XII-class unprotected cruiser of the Spanish Navy in commission from 1891 to 1900. She served primarily on ceremonial and colonial duties and supported Spanish operations during the First Melillan campaign but played no role in the Spanish-American War due to boiler problems.

== Technical description ==
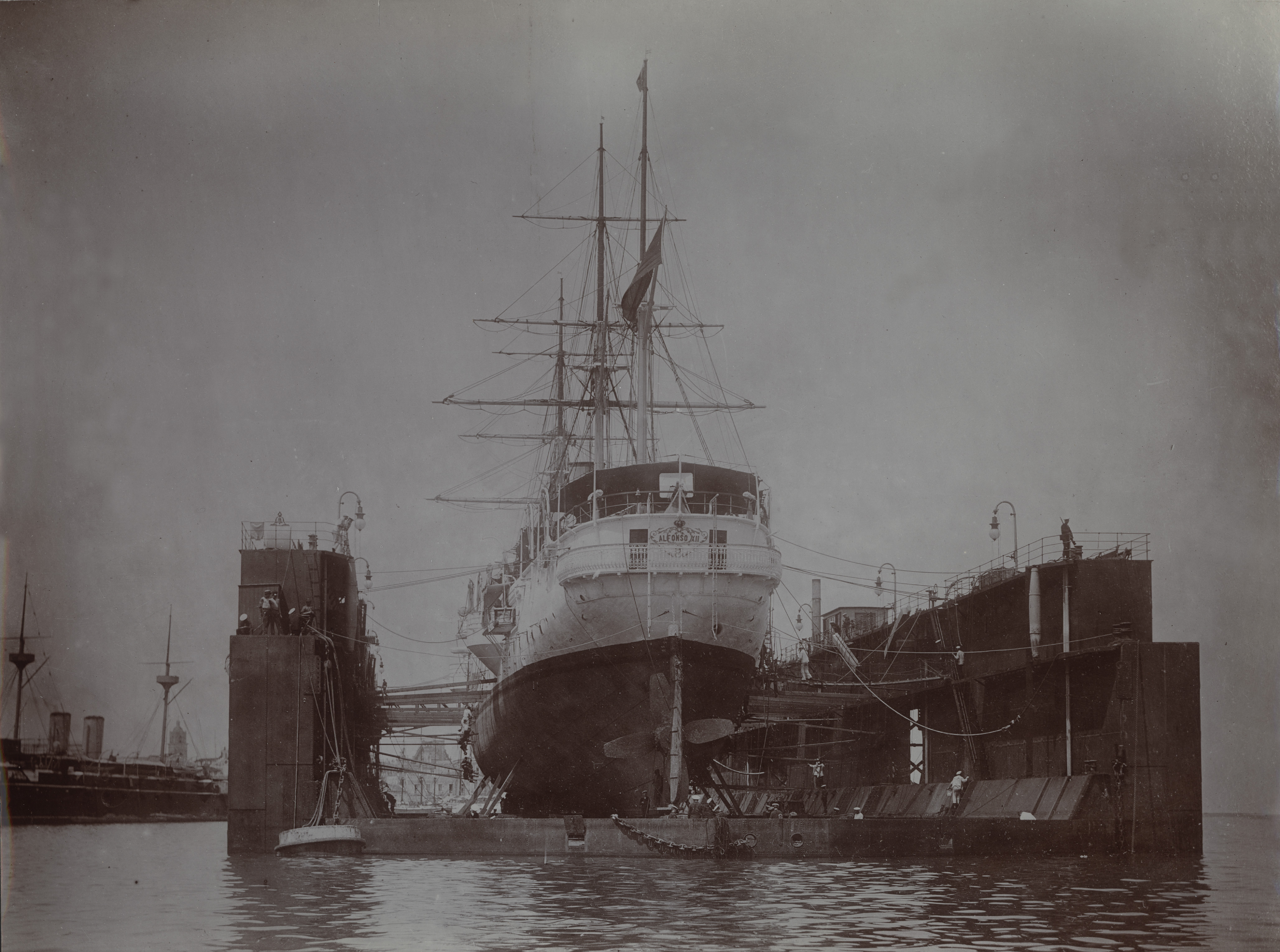
Alfonso XII in a floating drydock in Havana, Cuba.

Alfonso XII had two funnels. Her main armament was built by Gonzalez Hontoria and sponson-mounted. Her five torpedo tubes all were fixed; two were forward, one was on each beam, and one was aft. Although unprotected and therefore lacking armor, she had 12 watertight compartments built in a French-style cellular system to help her resist flooding. She was designed for colonial service, with an emphasis on speed and moderate armament, but in practice machinery problems made her a much slower steamer than her designers had hoped. She was rigged as a frigate.

== Construction and commissioning ==
Alfonso XII's construction was authorized on 14 October 1880. She was built by the naval shipyard at Ferrol, Spain; she and her sister ship Reina Cristina were the first two steel-hulled cruisers built there. Both her keel and that of Reina Cristina were laid down on 12 August 1881 in a ceremony with King Alfonso XII and Queen Maria Christina in attendance. Shortages of materials delayed Alfonso XII's construction, and she was not launched until either 21 August or 21 September 1887, according to different sources. She was designed to achieve between 13 and 15 knots (24 and 28 km/h; 15 and 17 mph), but during her sea trials did not exceed 13 knots (24 km/h; 15 mph). Alfonso XII commissioned in 1891.

== Operational history ==
Alfonso XII was at Ferrol when Minister of the Navy José María Beránger visited the fleet on 1 August 1891. She was among the ships that Beránger inspected that day. A few months after her commissioning, she deployed to Morocco to protect Spanish citizens and interests in the aftermath of an incident there.

Alfonso XII was assigned to the Training Squadron along with the battleship Pelayo, the protected cruiser Reina Regente, and the armored frigate Vitoria. The squadron arrived at Genoa, Italy, on 12 September 1892, joining the torpedo boat Temerario there to represent Spain in ceremonies observing the 400th anniversary of Christopher Columbus's discovery of the Americas. She later got underway from Cádiz along with other Spanish warships and naval vessels of other countries and proceeded to the waters off Huelva, Spain, for another observance of the anniversary on 12 October 1892.

In late August 1893, Alfonso XII arrived at Cartagena, Spain, to take part in maneuvers with Pelayo, Reina Regente, the protected cruiser Isla de Cuba, and the torpedo boats Barceló, Habana, and Rigel. The maneuvers involved simulated torpedo attacks off Santa Pola, Spain.

The Training Squadron got underway from Cartagena on 15 October 1893 and anchored at Santa Pola on 16 October for maneuvers simulating a battle off Alicante, Spain, between two formations of warships, one composed of Pelayo, Isla de Cuba, Barceló, Rigel, the unprotected cruiser Reina Mercedes, and the torpedo boat Rayo and the other of Reina Regente, Alfonso XII, Habana, the destroyer Destructor, and the torpedo boat Ariete, later joined by the unprotected cruiser Conde de Venadito. Plans called for the maneuvers to end on 22 October 1893, but the squadron interrupted them to come to the support of Spanish forces operating in North Africa in what became known as the First Melillan campaign. In late November 1893 additional Spanish warships joined the squadron, which concluded its operations when Spanish Army reinforcements arrived in North Africa at the end of November 1893.

Alfonso XII continued to serve in the Training Squadron, which anchored at Tangier in Morocco in August 1895, encountering three Imperial German Navy and six British Royal Navy warships there. The squadron subsequently returned to Spain, arriving at Algeciras on 17 August 1895.

In 1896 Alfonso XII deployed to Havana, Cuba. By 1897 she was anchored in Havana Harbor, serving as flagship for Admiral Vincente Manterola, but she was unable to put to sea because her boilers required a major refit, and some of her guns had been put ashore to aid in the harbor's shore-based defenses.

Amid growing tensions between the United States and Spain, the United States Navy armored cruiser Maine (often referred to as a "battleship") arrived at Havana unexpectedly on 25 January 1898. Her commanding officer, Captain Charles Sigsbee, fearing Spanish mines, requested that Maine be allowed to anchor in the berth occupied by Alfonso XII, where he presumed there would be no mines, but Alfonso XII's immobility forced him to accept an anchorage about 200 yards (180 m) away. Maine fired a salute to Manterola's pennant, which flew aboard Alfonso XII.

Maine was still in her anchorage near Alfonso XII when she exploded and sank on 15 February 1898. The crew of Alfonso XII immediately launched her boats and was heavily involved in rescuing Maine's survivors, treating them in her sick bay. Alfonso XII's crew also guarded Maine's wreck against depredations by souvenir hunters, unfortunately also mistakenly interfering with surviving officers of Maine who approached the wreck in civilian clothes. Members of Alfonso XII's crew also marched in the funeral cortege during services ashore in Havana for the men who had died aboard Maine. With war approaching, Alfonso XII put more of her guns ashore to reinforce the coastal batteries of the Torreón de la Chorrera: Three of her 160-millimetre (6.3 in) guns were mounted at the Chorrera battery and three at the La Reina battery.

The Spanish-American War began with the United States declaring war on Spain on 25 April 1898, stipulating that the declaration was retroactive to 21 April. On 10 May, Alfonso XII's guns in the Chorrera battery fired at a U.S. Navy auxiliary cruiser, and on 19 July her guns mounted ashore fired on the patrol yacht USS Mayflower. However, no significant combat operations occurred in the Havana area, and Alfonso XII herself, immobilized in the harbor by her boiler problems, contributed nothing else to the Spanish war effort. The war ended in August 1898 in a decisive victory for the United States.

Alfonso XII returned to Spain on 15 July 1899. She initially was assigned to a gunnery school, but this assignment was cancelled. On 18 May 1900 she was ordered disarmed, and she was decommissioned in 1900. She was stricken in 1904 and subsequently served as a coal depot hulk at the Arsenal de La Carraca in San Fernando, Spain. She was sold in 1907 and scrapped at the end of that year.
