= Isla de Luzon =

Isla de Luzon is Spanish for "Island of Luzon", ad may refer to:

- The island of Luzon in the Philippines.
- Isla de Luzon, a Spanish Navy second-class protected cruiser that fought in the Battle of Manila Bay during the Spanish–American War.
- USS Isla de Luzon, a U.S. Navy gunboat.
