= Reina Mercedes =

Reina Mercedes refers to several topics:

- "Reina Mercedes" is Spanish for "Queen Mercedes," and refers to Mercedes of Orleans, Queen Consort of Spain, wife of Alfonso XII.
- Reina Mercedes was a Spanish cruiser that fought in the Spanish–American War.
- USS Reina Mercedes was a ship in the United States Navy.
- Reina Mercedes is a municipality in the Philippines.
- Reina Mercedes Hospital, demolished to build the Cuban ice cream parlour Coppelia
