= Reina Cristina =

Reina Cristina can refer to more than one topic:

- "Reina Cristina" is Spanish for "Queen Christina," and refers to Maria Christina of Austria, Queen Consort of Spain, second wife of Alonso XII.
- Reina Cristina was a Spanish cruiser that fought in the Battle of Manila Bay during the Spanish–American War.
