= Isla de Cuba =

Isla de Cuba is Spanish for "Island of Cuba", and may refer to:

- The island of Cuba
- Isla de Cuba, a Spanish second-class protected cruiser in service from 1887 to 1898 that fought in the Battle of Manila Bay during the Spanish–American War.
- USS Isla de Cuba, a U.S. Navy gunboat in service from 1900 to 1904.
