= Missouri Wing Civil Air Patrol =

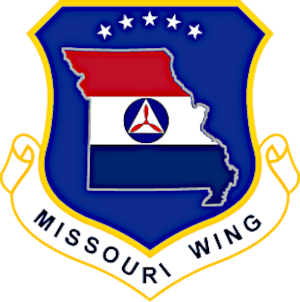
- Missouri Wing of Civil Air Patrol

Associated branches
- United States Air Force

Command staff
- Commander: Col Jennifer L. Smith
- Deputy Commander: Lt Col Raun Hamilton & Lt Col Richard Veach

Current statistics
- Cadets: 459
- Seniors: 531
- Total Membership: 990
- Website: mowg.cap.gov
- Statistics as of 2025

The Missouri Wing of Civil Air Patrol (CAP) is the highest echelon of Civil Air Patrol in the state of Missouri. Missouri Wing headquarters are located in Whiteman Air Force Base. The Missouri Wing consists of over 800 cadet and adult members at 28 locations across the state of Missouri.

== Mission ==
The Missouri Wing performs the three missions of Civil Air Patrol: providing emergency services; offering cadet programs for youth; and providing aerospace education for Civil Air Patrol members and the general public.

=== Emergency services ===
Civil Air Patrol performs search and rescue missions, directed by the Air Force Rescue Coordination Center at Tyndall Air Force Base. Civil Air Patrol provides air and ground transportation and an extensive communications network during disaster relief efforts, and conducts aerial photography of damaged areas after natural disasters. The CAP provides Air Force support, including light transport, communications support, and low-altitude route survey. The CAP also provides assistance in counter-drug operations.

=== Cadet programs ===
Civil Air Patrol provides a program for cadets aged 12 to 21, which is conducted as a 16-step program including aerospace education, leadership training, physical fitness and moral leadership.

=== Aerospace education ===
Civil Air Patrol offers aerospace education for CAP members and the general public by providing training to CAP cadets, and offering workshops for youth throughout the nation through schools and public aviation events.

== Organization ==
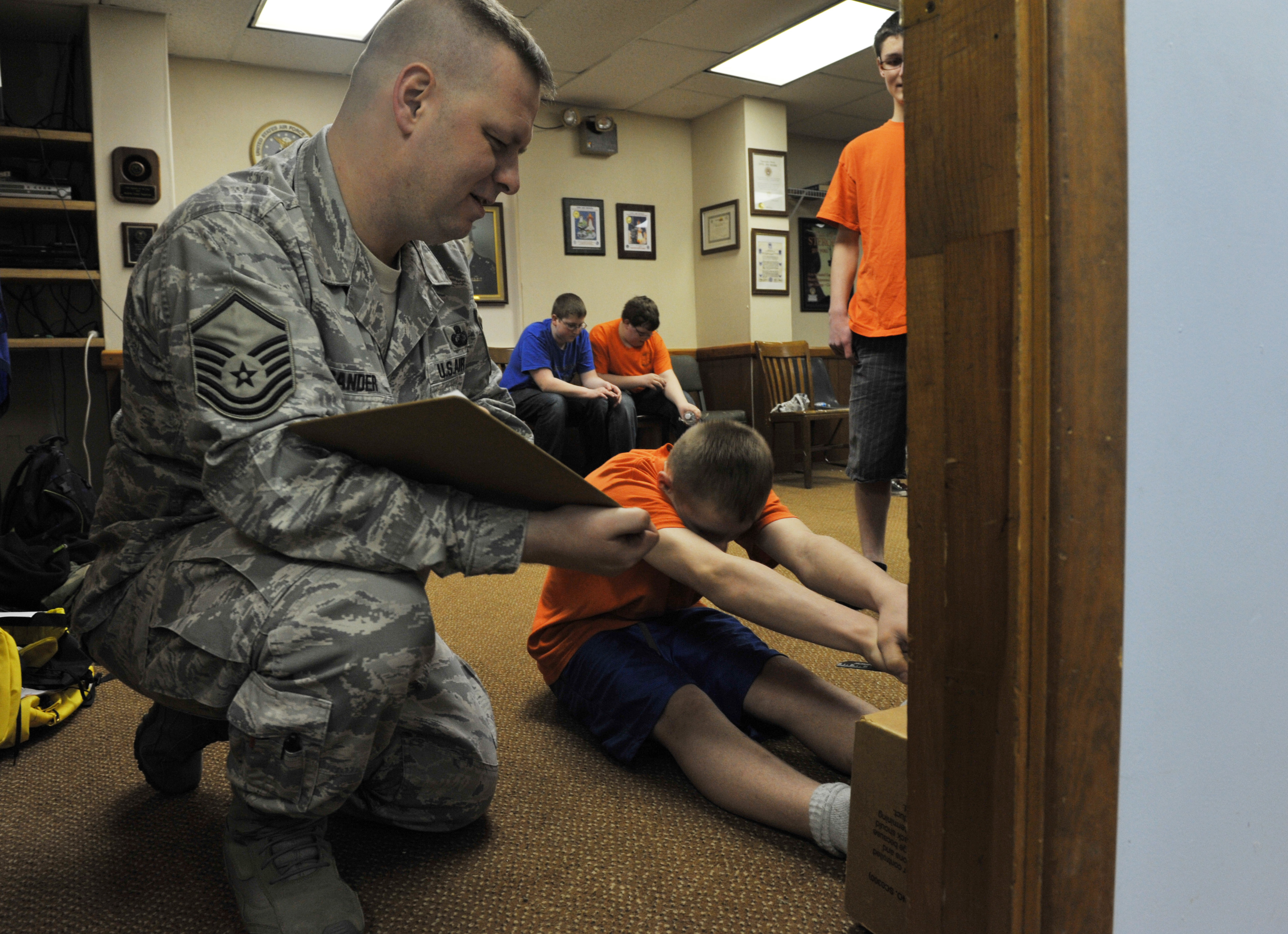
Master Sgt. William Sander, 509th Comptroller Squadron financial services superintendent, measures a Missouri Wing Civil Air Patrol cadet's, sit-and-reach physical assessment.

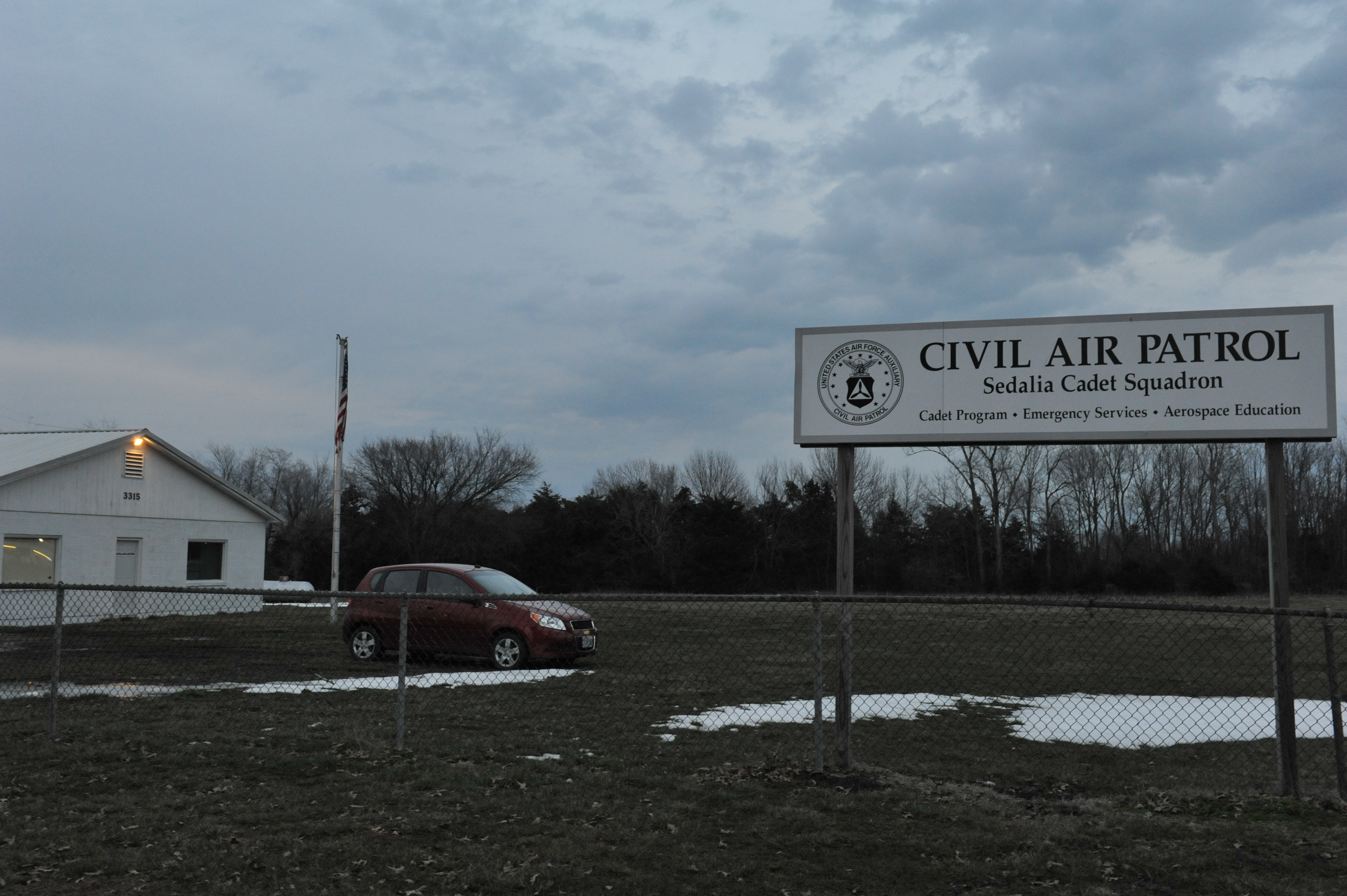
The Sedalia Cadet Squadron's location in Sedalia, Missouri.

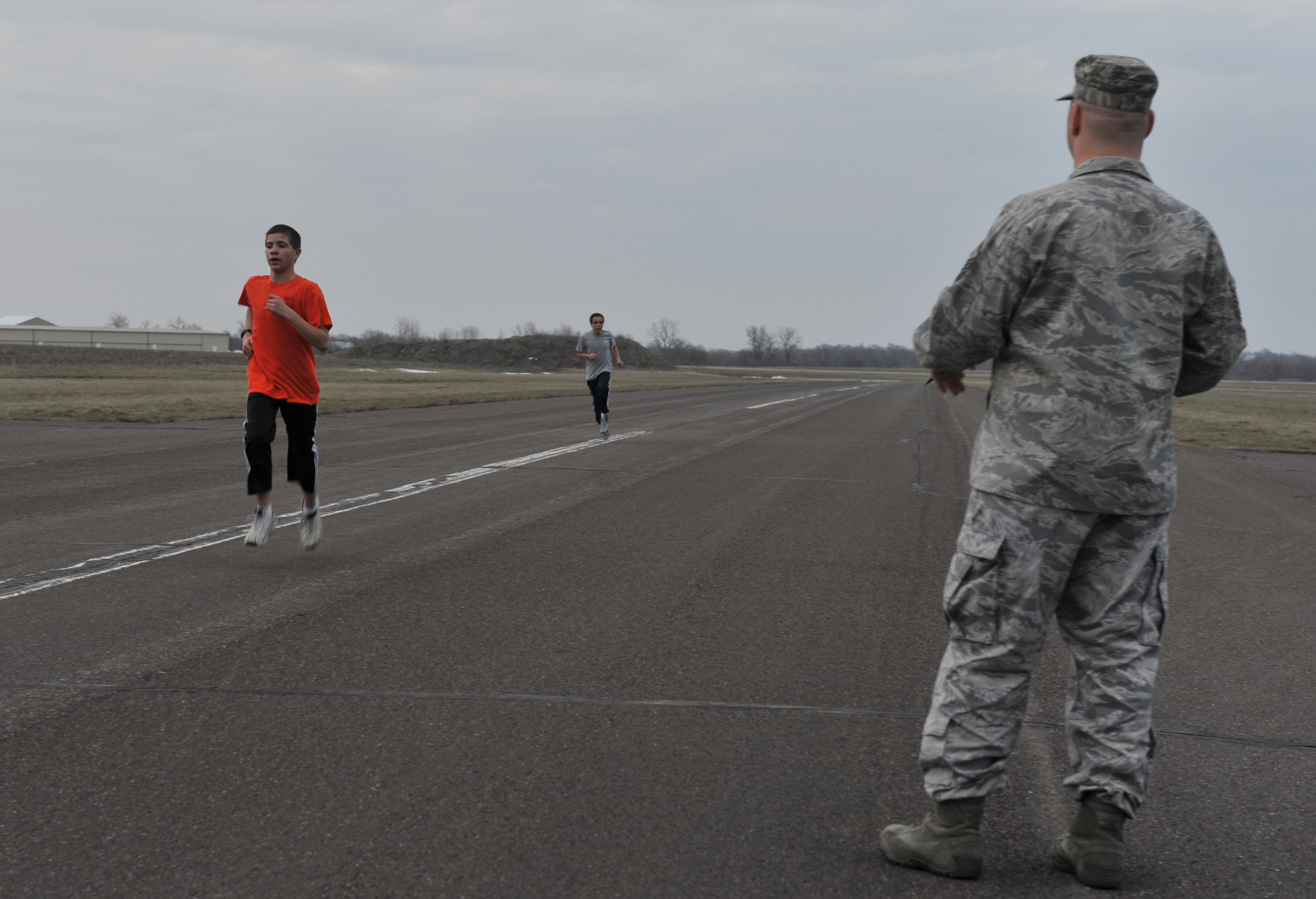
Master Sgt. William Sander records the run times of two CAP cadets.

Squadrons of the Missouri Wing
Group	Designation	Squadron Name	Location	Commander
Wing Headquarters	NCR-MO-001	Missouri Wing Headquarters	Whiteman AFB	Col Jennifer L. Smith
	NCR-MO-999	Missouri State Legislative Squadron	Jefferson City	
Group 1	NCR-MO-023	Harry S. Truman Composite Squadron	Kansas City	Jacob Mong
	NCR-MO-126	Lee Summit Composite Squadron	Lee Summit	Victoria Van Horn
	NCR-MO-129	Kansas City-Charles R. Long Senior Squadron	Kansas City	Kevin Huckaby
	NCR-MO-139	Warrensburg Composite Squadron	Warrensburg	Karen Glaesemann
	NCR-MO-140	Platte Valley Composite Squadron	Parkville	Joel Mayer
	NCR-MO-161	Excelsior Springs Composite Squadron	Excelsior Springs	Shelia Caven
Group 2	NCR-MO-005	St. Louis Flight	Creve Coeur	Bruce Gossage
	NCR-MO-110	Wentzville Composite Squadron	Wentzville	Eric Hauquitz
	NCR-MO-111	Gateway Senior Squadron	Chesterfield	Keith Monteith
	NCR-MO-127	Trail of Tears Composite Squadron	Jackson	Christina Ragain
	NCR-MO-144	St. Francois Senior Flight	Bonne Terre	Charles Harter
Group 3	NCR-MO-009	Sedalia Cadet Flight	Sedalia	Jason Unwin
	NCR-MO-018	Central Missouri Composite Squadron	Columbia	Matthew Brown
	NCR-MO-117	Saline County Composite Squadron	Marshall	
	NCR-MO-160	Lake Ozark Regional Composite Squadron	Eldon	
Group 5	NCR-MO-070	Springfield Regional Composite Squadron	Springfield	
	NCR-MO-143	Col Travis Hoover Composite Squadron	Joplin	
	NCR-MO-147	Table Rock Lake Composite Squadron	Kimberling City	Stephen Meinzen
	NCR-MO-153	Fort Leonard Wood Composite Squadron	Fort Leonard Wood	
	NCR-MO-155	Laclede County Composite Squadron	Lebanon	
	NCR-MO-165	Barry-Lawrence Composite Squadron	Aurora	Samantha Atwell

== Legal protection ==
Members of Civil Air Patrol who are employed by the state of Missouri, or who work for a company with fifty or more employees, are guaranteed under Missouri law a leave of absence in order to respond to emergency missions as a part of Civil Air Patrol for up to fifteen days per calendar year, or without regard to the length of time when responding to a state or nationally declared emergency in the state of Missouri. The leave is to be granted without loss of time, pay, regular leave, impairment of efficiency rating or of any other rights or benefits to which such an employee would otherwise be entitled.

== See also ==
- Missouri Air National Guard
- Missouri Naval Militia
- Missouri Reserve Military Force
