= Missouri State Defense Force =

Militia branch of the State of Missouri

- Founded: 2012 – 2022
- Allegiance: Missouri
- Type: State defense force
- Part of: Missouri Department of Public Safety
- Headquarters: Ike Skelton Training Site
- Website: Adjutant General's Office

Commanders
- Commander in Chief: Governor Mike Parson
- Director of Public Safety: Sandy Karsten
- Adjutant General: Brigadier General Levon Cumpton

The Missouri State Defense Force (MSDF) was the official state defense force of Missouri, deactivated in 2022. As a state defense force, the MSDF was a reserve military force which served parallel to the Missouri National Guard. As the MSDF fell solely under the command of the state of Missouri, it could not be federalized or deployed outside the borders of Missouri, unlike the National Guard. Although the MSDF and the Missouri National Guard were separate organizations, the MSDF's primary scope was to work alongside the National Guard during stateside operations, or in lieu of the National Guard when the National Guard is deployed outside of Missouri. Along with the Missouri Army National Guard, the Missouri Air National Guard, and the Missouri Naval Militia, the Missouri State Defense Force is recognized under Missouri law as part of the organized militia of Missouri.

The Missouri State Defense Force was a division of the Missouri Department of Public Safety.

== Background ==
World War II era Missouri State Guard Shoulder Sleeve Insignia

The state of Missouri authorized and created state defense forces during each of the world wars. As a response to the United States' entrance into World War I, the United States Congress passed the Home Guard Act of 1917, which allowed the states to create home guard units, which could receive surplus weaponry from the federal government. Fearing violence from rioting strikers and anti-war protesters, the state of Missouri created the Missouri Home Guard in 1917 and maintained it until Armistice with Germany. The Missouri Home Guard, at its peak, consisted of five regiments, six separate battalions, and sixteen separate companies, as well as a separate cavalry troop. The Home Guard, which reached a strength of over 6,000 men by the end of the war, was deployed several times to keep the peace after a number of labor strikes turned violent.

The state defense force was resurrected during World War II. The Missouri State Guard was activated and began recruitment the same day the Missouri National Guard began entering federal service. By December 1941, the Missouri State Guard consisted of over 3,000 soldiers organized into five infantry regiments. In 1943 alone, the State Guard was responsible for responding to statewide flooding, ending a civil disturbance in Cape Girardeau, and fighting a large fire in Lamar which destroyed much of the town square. The regiments were gradually disbanded throughout 1946, following the return of the Missouri National Guard to state service, and as of 1 January 1947 the Missouri State Guard officially ceased to exist.

On September 9, 1982, Governor Christopher “Kit” Bond signed Executive Order 82-17 creating a Missouri Reserve Force and ordering the state's adjutant general to organize the force. However, the adjutant general did not execute this order at that time.

== History ==
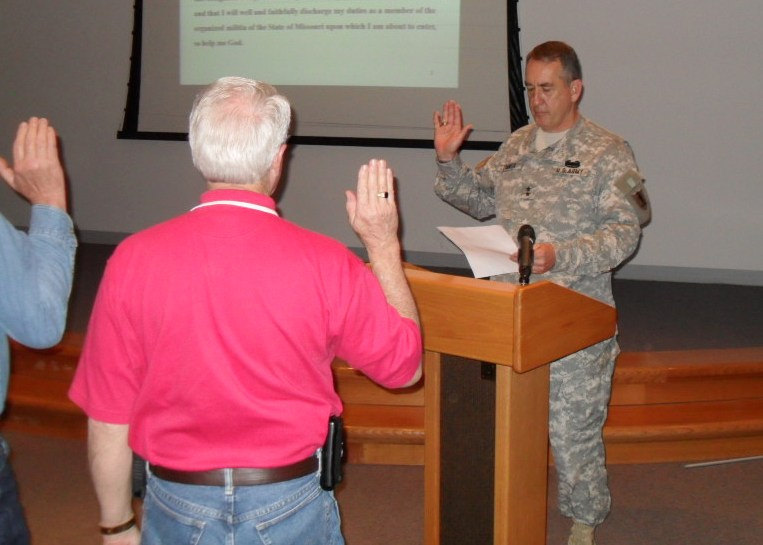
Maj. Gen. Stephen Danner, Adjutant General of Missouri, administers an oath to the initial members of the Missouri Reserve Force at the Ike Skelton Training Site.

It was not until December 2012 that the force was officially organized. On June 1, 2018, Missouri Governor Eric Greitens signed HB 1469 into law which modifies provisions of the Missouri military code by changing the name of the “Missouri Reserve Military Force” to the “Missouri State Defense Force”.

The MSDF was temporarily suspended in 2020 due to budget concerns on the same day of Missouri's first positive COVID-19 case, but the Missouri General Assembly restored funding for the MSDF in May 2020. The MSDF was again de-activated in 2022 after the Missouri National Guard "concluded that the Missouri State Defense Force provided little to no benefit to the National Guard."

== Membership ==
Prospective members of the MSDF had to be at least seventeen years old, but no older than sixty-four. However, the adjutant general could waive the upper age limit on a case-by-case basis. There was no physical examination required for membership, but members had to guarantee they were able-bodied citizens, in good health, and capable of performing moderate physical activity.

== Duties ==
The MSDF carried the same stateside responsibilities as the Missouri National Guard, including assisting the National Guard on recovery operations following natural disasters. In the event of the National Guard deploying outside of the state, the MSDF was assigned to assist in the mobilization process and assume the stateside duties of the National Guard for the duration of the deployment, including:

- protecting life and property in times of emergency
- assisting the adjutant general in preparation of the mobilization of the Missouri National Guard for active duty
- assisting family members at home during deployments
- assisting the adjutant general in control and operation of state military property left behind following Missouri National Guard mobilizations.

== Legal basis ==
All U.S. states and territories are allowed to create and maintain their own military forces, independent of the federal military, under Title 32 of the United States Code. State defense forces are allowed under Missouri law as well, under Chapter 41, Section 41.070 of the Missouri Revised Statutes.

Members of the Missouri State Defense Force were given the same legal protections under Missouri law as federal reservists are entitled to under the Uniformed Services Employment and Reemployment Rights Act (USERRA). This guaranteed, among other protections, that employers of MSDF members were required to give those employees a leave of absence when they were activated for training or to perform emergency services, and to reinstate these employees to their positions of employment when they returned.

== See also ==
- Missouri Naval Militia
- Missouri Wing Civil Air Patrol
- State Guard Association of the United States
