= Alfonso XII-class cruiser =

Class of spanish-built unprotected cruisers

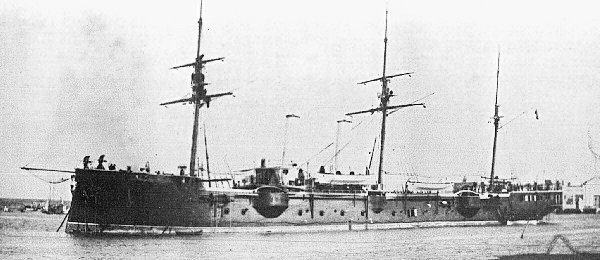
- Reina Mercedes

Class overview
- Name: Alfonso XII class
- Builders: Cartagena and Ferrol, Spain
- Operators: Spanish Navy
- Built: 1881–1891
- In commission: 1891–1900
- Planned: 3
- Completed: 3
- Lost: 2
- Retired: 1

General characteristics
- Type: Unprotected cruiser
- Displacement: 3,042 tons
- Length: 278 ft (85 m)
- Beam: 43 ft (13 m)
- Draft: 20 ft 0 in (6.10 m) maximum
- Speed: 17 kn (31 km/h)
- Endurance: 500 tons of coal (normal), 720 tons of coal (maximum)
- Complement: 370
- Armament: 6 × 6.4-inch (163 mm) guns; 8 × 6-pounder Hotchkiss quick-firing guns; 6 × 3-pounder Hotchkiss revolvers; 5 × 14-inch (356 mm) torpedo tubes

The Alfonso XII class of unprotected cruisers was a series of three ships built during the 1880s for service with the Spanish Navy. They were named for a Spanish king and two Spanish queens.

== Description ==
The Alfonso XII class had three masts and two funnels. They were unarmored, but their hulls were built with a French-style cellular system with 12 watertight bulkheads. The Ferrol-built ships were the first two steel-hulled cruisers built in that yard. The main guns were built by Hontoria and mounted in sponsons. The torpedo tubes were fixed; one was on each beam, two were forward, and one was aft. The class took a long time to complete; the lead unit was delayed for five years by material shortages and took ten years from keel-laying to commissioning.

The ships were designed for colonial service, and were not intended to fight the armored and heavily armed ships they would meet in the Spanish–American War. They were plagued by machinery and boiler problems, and proved to be much slower steamers than their designers had intended.

== History ==
After early service in home waters, the Alfonso XII-class cruisers were assigned to colonial duty in the Caribbean and Philippines. Thanks to machinery and boiler problems, only one was seaworthy during the Spanish–American War, and two were lost during the conflict, one of the sunken ships being salvaged and put into service in the United States Navy. The lone survivor in Spanish service was decommissioned soon after the war.

== Ships in class ==
=== Alfonso XII ===
Named for a Spanish king and laid down in 1881, Alfonso XII was delayed during construction for five years by material shortages and not completed until 1891. She was immobilized at Havana, Cuba, by machinery and boiler trouble by 1897, and was anchored only 200 yards (180 m) from the battleship USS Maine when the latter exploded in February 1898. Unable to get underway, she took no part in the ensuing Spanish–American War except to land her guns for use in coastal defenses. She was decommissioned in 1900, the last survivor of the class in Spanish service.

=== Reina Cristina ===
Named for a Spanish queen, Reina Cristina was launched in 1887. After early service in Spanish waters, she was sent to the Philippines, where she supported Spanish actions against Philippine insurgents. She was flagship of the squadron of Rear Admiral Patricio Montojo y Pasaron at Manila Bay and the only member of her class that was seaworthy when the Spanish–American War broke out, and was sunk in the Battle of Manila Bay on 1 May 1898.

=== Reina Mercedes ===
Named for a Spanish queen, Reina Mercedes was launched in 1887. After early service in Spanish waters, she was sent to the Caribbean, where she became flagship of Spanish naval forces in Cuban waters. She was immobilized by boiler trouble at Santiago de Cuba when the Spanish–American War began, and was trapped there along with the squadron of Vice Admiral Pascual Cervera y Topete. After the annihilation of Cervera's squadron in the Battle of Santiago de Cuba, Reina Mercedes was scuttled as a blockship in the harbor entrance on the night of 4–5 July 1898. She was soon salvaged by the United States Navy and served for many years in the United States as the unarmed receiving ship USS Reina Mercedes.
