= Gonzalez Hontoria de 16 cm mod 1883 =

- Type: Naval gun Coastal artillery
- Place of origin: Spain

Service history
- In service: 1886-1910
- Used by: Spain
- Wars: Spanish–American War

Production history
- Designed: 1883
- Produced: 1886

Specifications
- Mass: 6.4 t (7.1 short tons)
- Length: 5.8 m (19 ft 0 in)
- Barrel length: 5.6 m (18 ft 4 in) 35 caliber
- Height: 4 m (13 ft 1 in)
- Shell: Separate loading 29 kg (64 lb) smokeless powder bagged charge and projectile
- Shell weight: 51–59 kg (112–130 lb)
- Caliber: 160 mm (6.3 in)
- Breech: Interrupted screw
- Muzzle velocity: 618 m/s (2,030 ft/s)
- Maximum firing range: 9.8 km (6.1 mi) at +17.5°

The Gonzalez Hontoria de 16 cm mod 1883 was a Spanish naval gun developed in the late 1800s that armed a variety of warships of the Spanish Navy during the Spanish–American War.

== History ==
The Hontoria guns were designed by José González Hontoria a Spanish inventor, field marshal of marine infantry and brigadier of the navy. During the 1800s Spain lagged behind other European powers in industrialization and Spain imported weapons from Krupp, Armstrong Whitworth and Schneider et Cie. During the 1860s and 1870s, Hontoria studied explosives, metallurgy, and industrial production with the aim of developing an indigenous arms industry.

== Construction ==
In 1879 Hontoria designed a series of naval guns ranging from 20 cm (7.9 in) to 7 cm (2.8 in) which would lay the foundation for his later guns. The 1879 series like Ordóñez guns of the same period were breech loading, black powder, built up guns, with steel A tube and cast iron reinforcing hoops. The 1883 series was a step forward in that they were breech loading, built up guns, with forged steel A tube and forged steel reinforcing hoops. The Hontoria 1883 series ranged in size from 32 cm (13 in) to 12 cm (4.7 in) and were 35 calibers in length. They were produced by the Arsenal de la Carraca in Cadiz and the Royal Ordnance Works at Trubia in Asturias. During the 1890s some 12 cm, 14 cm and 16 cm were converted to quick fire guns with assistance from Schneider et Cie.

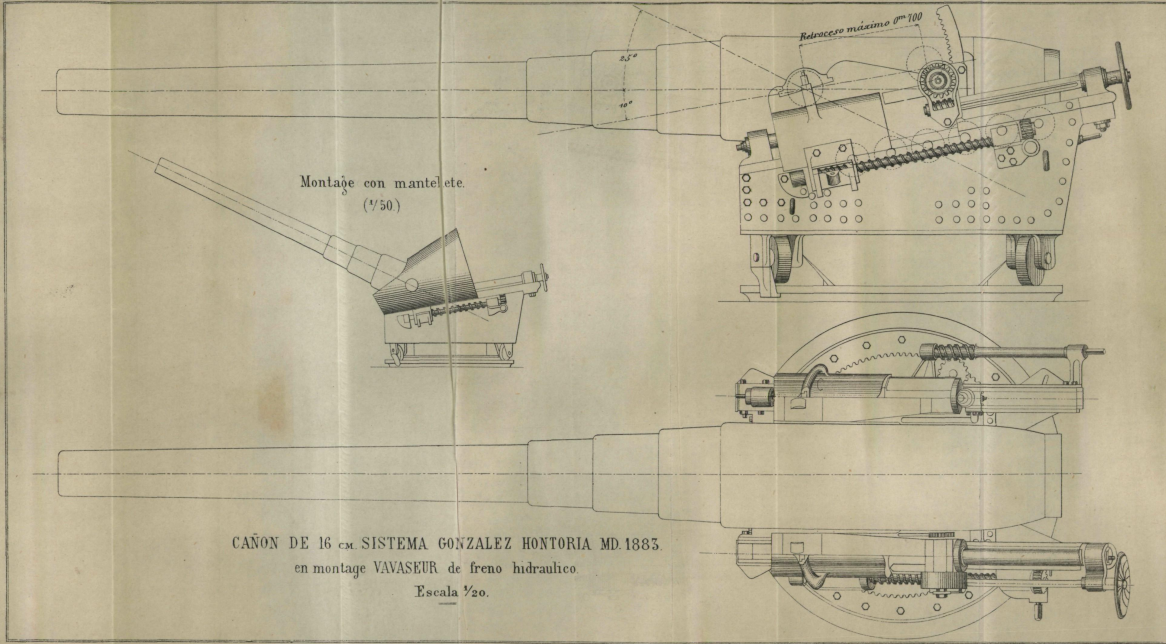

Criticisms of the 1883 series guns:

- Outdated design - Some argue that the 1883 series production methods were outdated compared to its European rivals. The counter argument is Spain only recently switched to producing steel weapons and purchasing a foreign design would do nothing to promote self-sufficiency in weapons design and production. Also that the cost of retooling to produce another design would have meant that recent infrastructure improvements were a wasted investment.
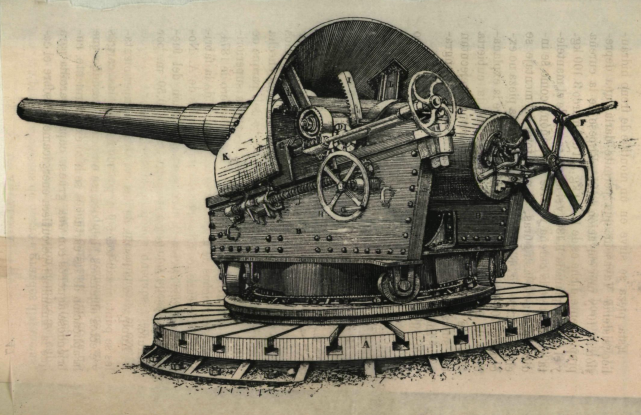
- Slow rate of fire - Some argue that the 1883 series should have been designed as quick firing weapons from the beginning and that attempts to convert them to quick firing were unsuccessful. The counter argument is that Spain didn't have that experience and it would have meant delaying production schedules when they were already delayed due to insufficient industrial capacity.
- Short barrel length - Some argue that the 35 caliber length was too short when compared to its European rivals who were producing 45 caliber guns and that the short barrel length didn't leverage the power of new smokeless powders efficiently. The counter argument is that Spanish industry didn't have the capacity to produce longer barrels, having only recently switched to steel production. Also that the powders of the time needed reformulation to increase efficiency and increasing barrel length was only partial fix.

== Naval use ==
16 cm Hontoria 1883 guns armed a variety of ships such as ironclads and unprotected cruisers of the Spanish Navy.

=== Ironclad battleships ===
- Pelayo - The tertiary armament of this ship consisted of eight casemated 12 cm guns amidships and one casemated 16 cm chaser gun in the bow. The Pelayo was in the middle of a refit during the Spanish–American War which was supposed to replace her 16 cm and 12 cm Hontoria guns with 14 cm Hontoria guns. She was recalled to service before the refit was complete and saw no action during the war.

=== Unprotected Cruisers ===
- Alfonso XII-class - The three ships of this class had a primary armament of six shielded 16 cm guns in sponsons amidships. Two ships of this class would see action during the Spanish–American War. On the night of 2–3 June 1898, gunfire from Reina Mercedes contributed to the sinking of the USS Merrimac while on an unsuccessful blockship mission in Santiago Harbor. Reina Cristina was sunk during the Battle of Manila Bay and Reina Mercedes was sunk during the Battle of Santiago de Cuba. Reina Mercedes was later raised, repaired and commissioned in the US Navy under her former name.

== Coastal artillery ==
Six guns removed from the Reina Mercedes found a second life as Coastal Artillery defending Santiago Harbor, Cuba. Four guns were installed at batteries at Socapa and two at Punta Gorda. A shell from the Socapa battery slightly damaged the USS Texas during the Battle of Santiago de Cuba.

== Ammunition ==
The guns used separate loading, bagged smokeless powder charges weighing 29 kg (64 lb) and projectiles.

The gun was able to fire:

- Armor Piercing 59 kg (130 lb)
- Armor Piercing Capped 59 kg (130 lb)
- Common 51 kg (112 lb)
- Common Pointed Capped 51 kg (112 lb)

== Photo Gallery ==
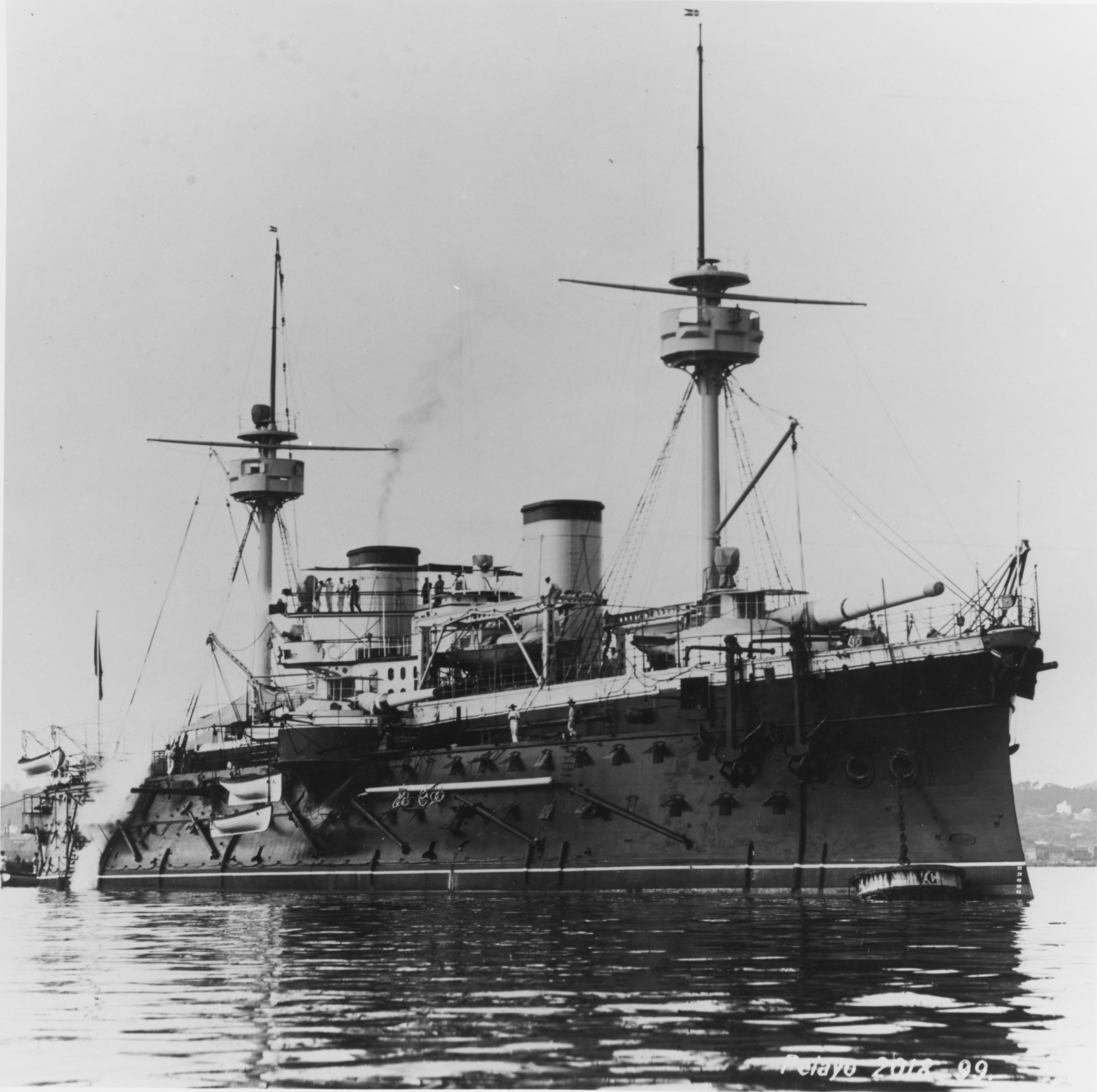
The Spanish Ironclad Pelayo.

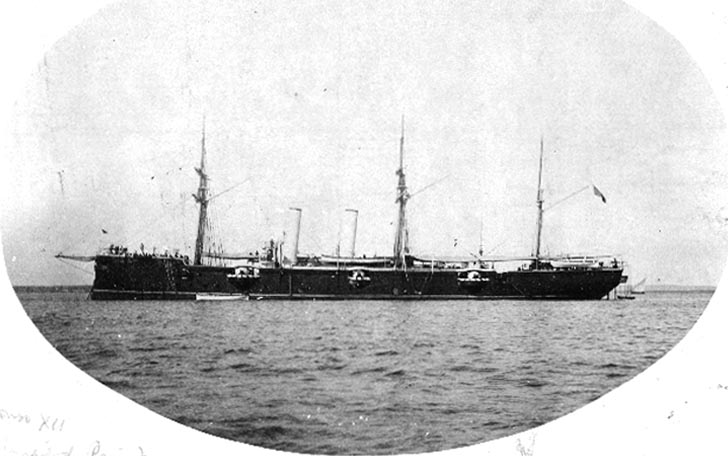
The Spanish Cruiser Alfonso XII.

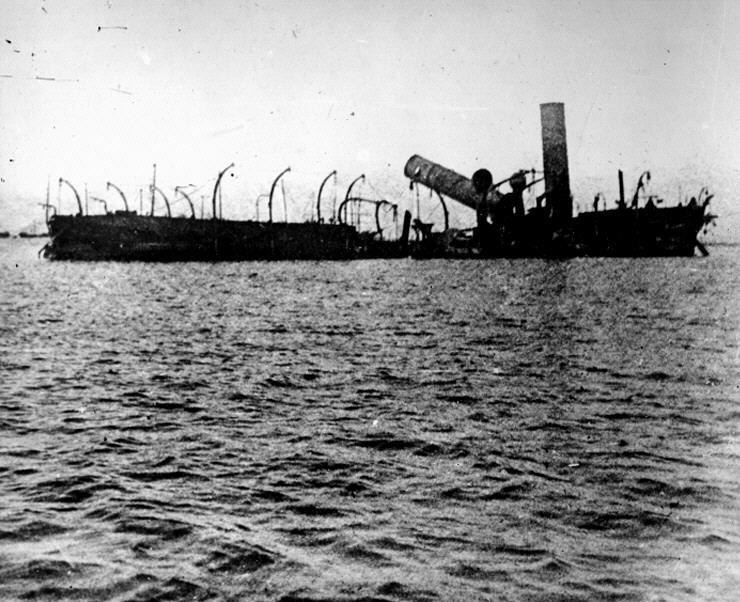
The wreck of the Reina Cristina.

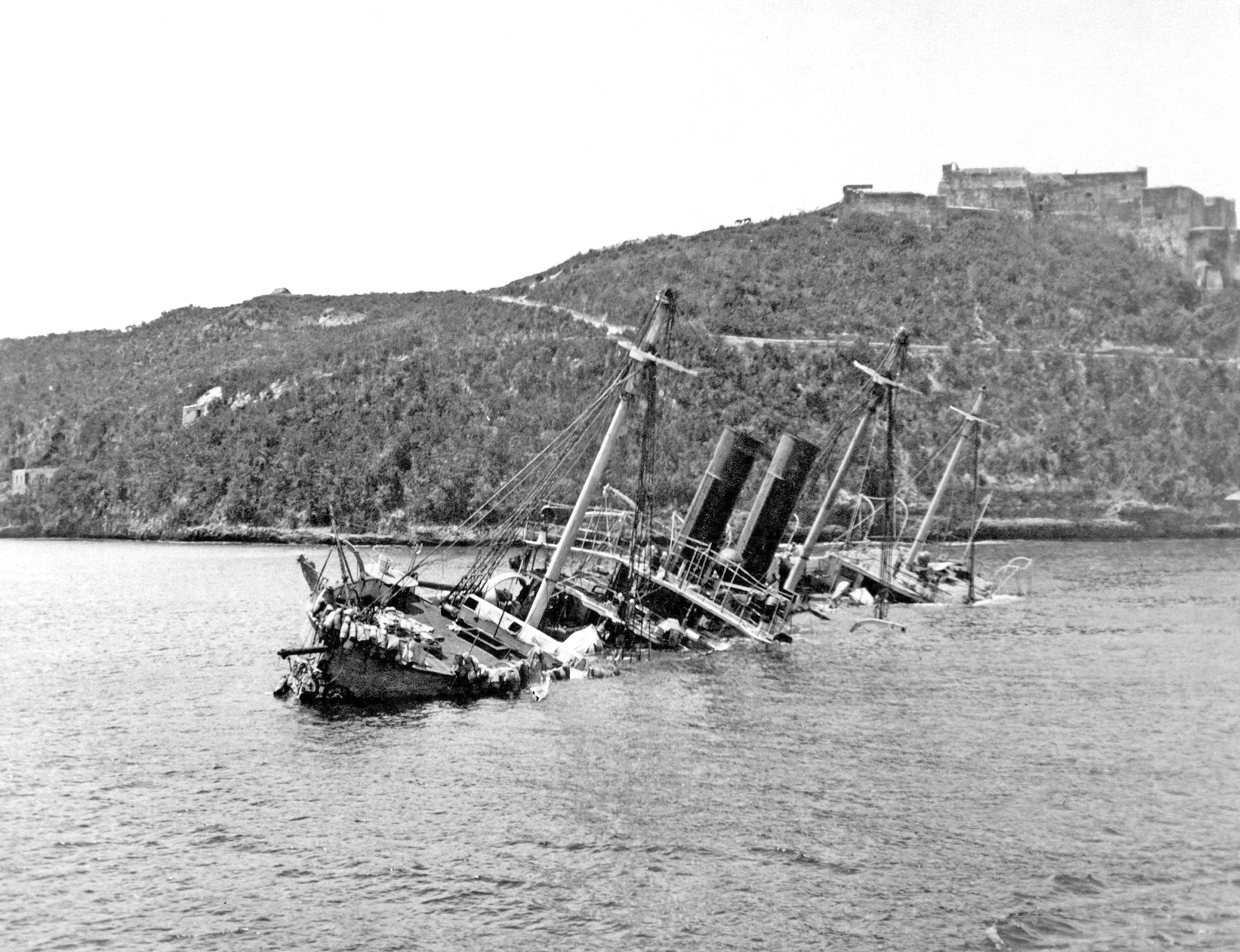
The wreck of the Reina Mercedes.
