= José González Hontoria =

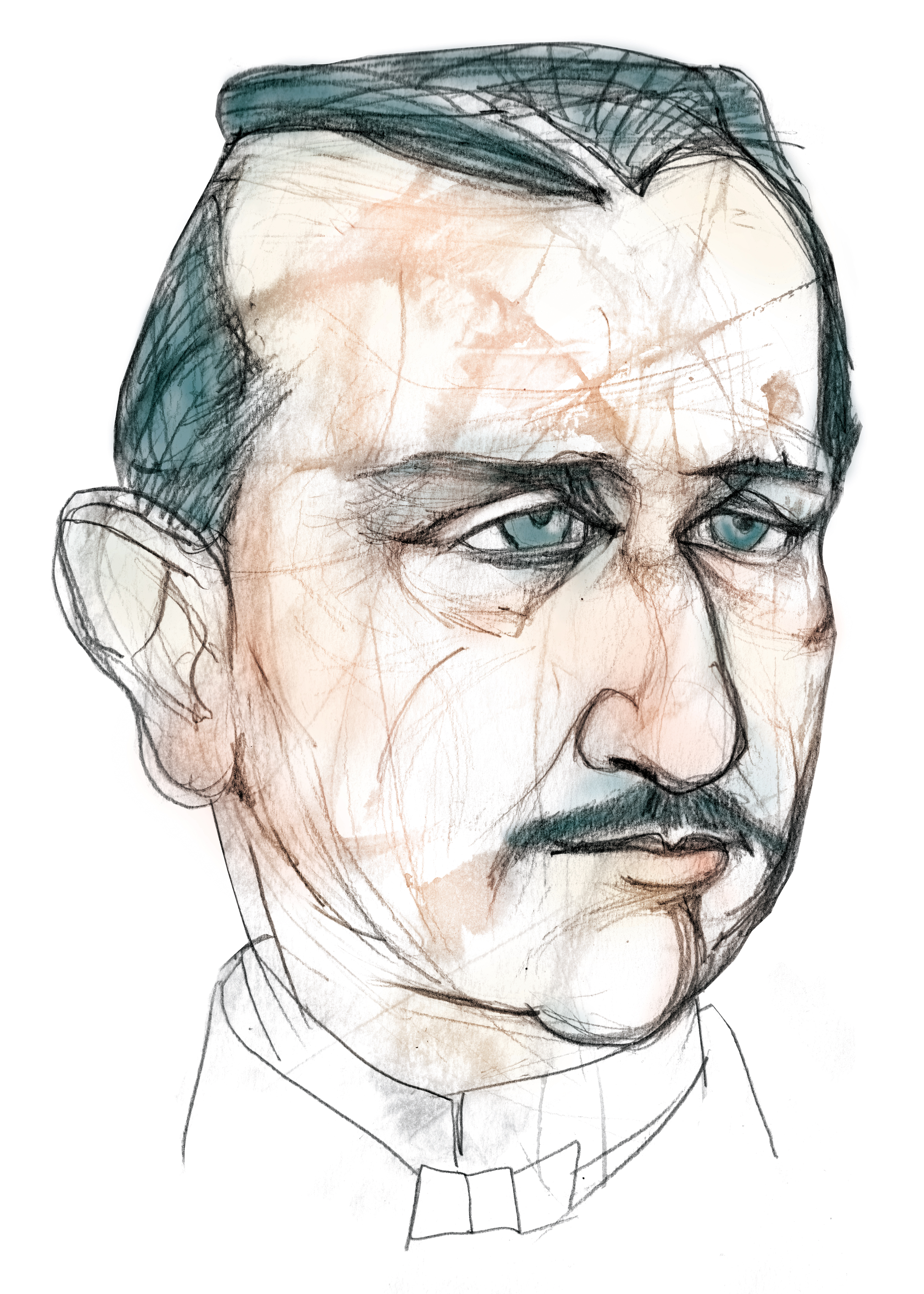
- Portrait of José González Hontoria by Eulogia Merle
- Born: 21 July 1840; Sanlúcar de Barrameda, Spain
- Died: 1889 (aged 48–49); Carabanchel, Spain
- Burial place: Panteón de Marinos Ilustres
- Military career
- Allegiance: Spain
- Branch: Naval Infantry
- Rank: Field Marshal
- Awards: Order of Charles III

José González Hontoria (21 July 1840 – 1889) was a Spanish inventor, field marshal of the marine infantry and brigadier of the navy.

== Biography ==
At nine years old he entered the Military Naval College of San Fernando on 31 December 1851 as a midshipman. On 11 March 1858 he was commissioned as a student sublieutenant of the Academy of the Royal Corps of Artillery of the Navy from which he graduated in 1860 as a lieutenant and on 4 September was named assistant professor of the academy. He was sent by superiors on a path of learning and apprenticeship for the manufacture of gunpowder and arms, as well as to study the processes for the foundation of national industry. On 31 January 1861 he returned to his work as a professor.

From 17 August 1863 he again took command of the School and Branch of Naval Gunners, of which he was the most senior professor.

He made several studies about procedures for the production of gunpowder and the manufacture of artillery. In 1879 the artillery system which he created was accepted for service in the navy and he was designated to study the system of manufacture of calibers, the design of guns and projectiles. He performed numerous missions of service in Spain and abroad.

He was made very good offers by English cannon manufacturers to be the manager, but he did not accept them because he preferred to render his services to Spain.

He designed diverse types of guns for the Spanish Navy, among them the so-called Trubia, a model of 160mm gun that in those times was considered the most powerful in Europe. He also designed 240mm, 280mm, and 320mm guns as armaments for ships of the navy.

He was buried at the Pantheon of Illustrious Mariners on 8 July 1907.

== Gallery ==
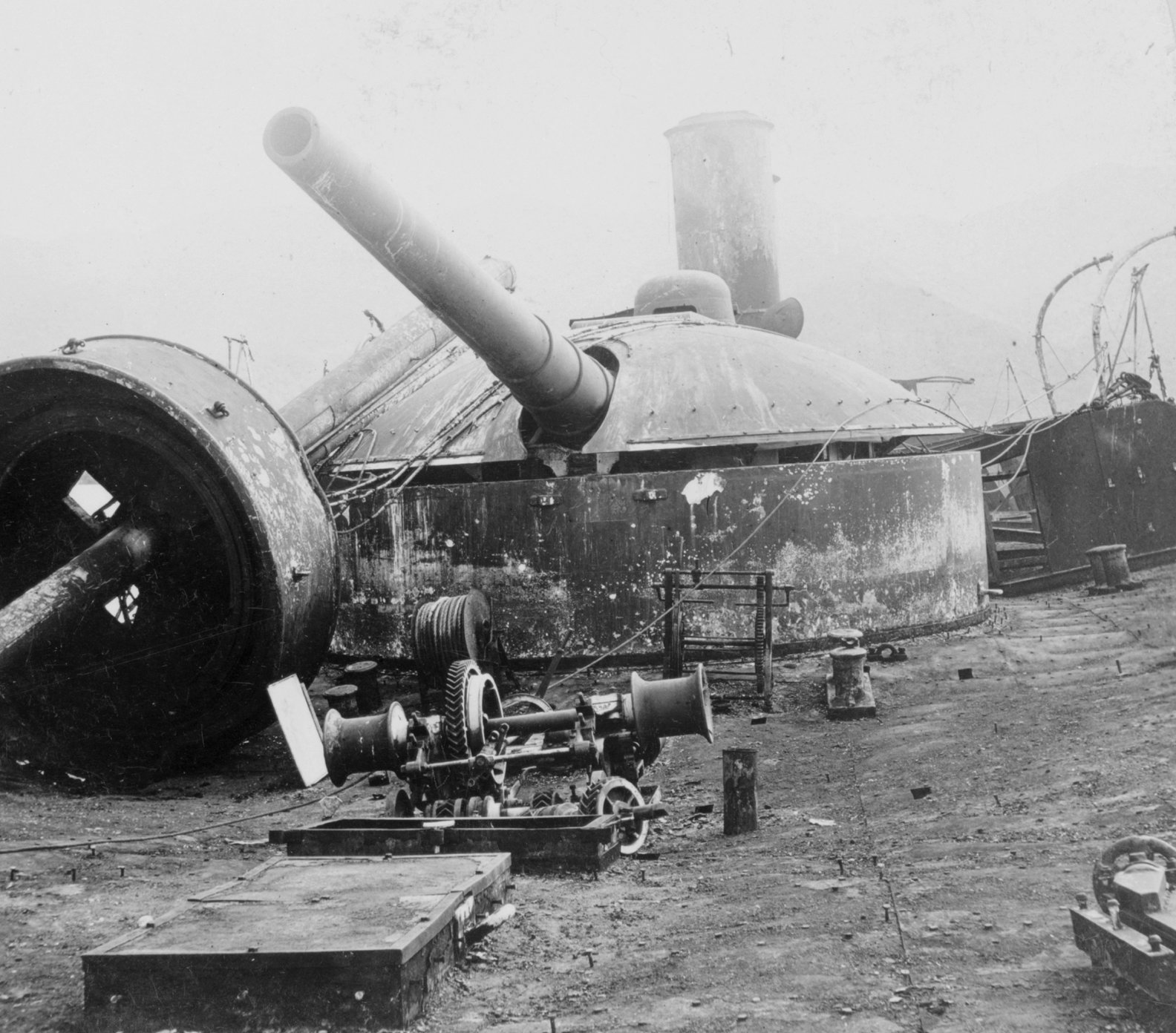
A 280mm González Hontoria gun on the wreck of an Infanta María Teresa-class cruiser.

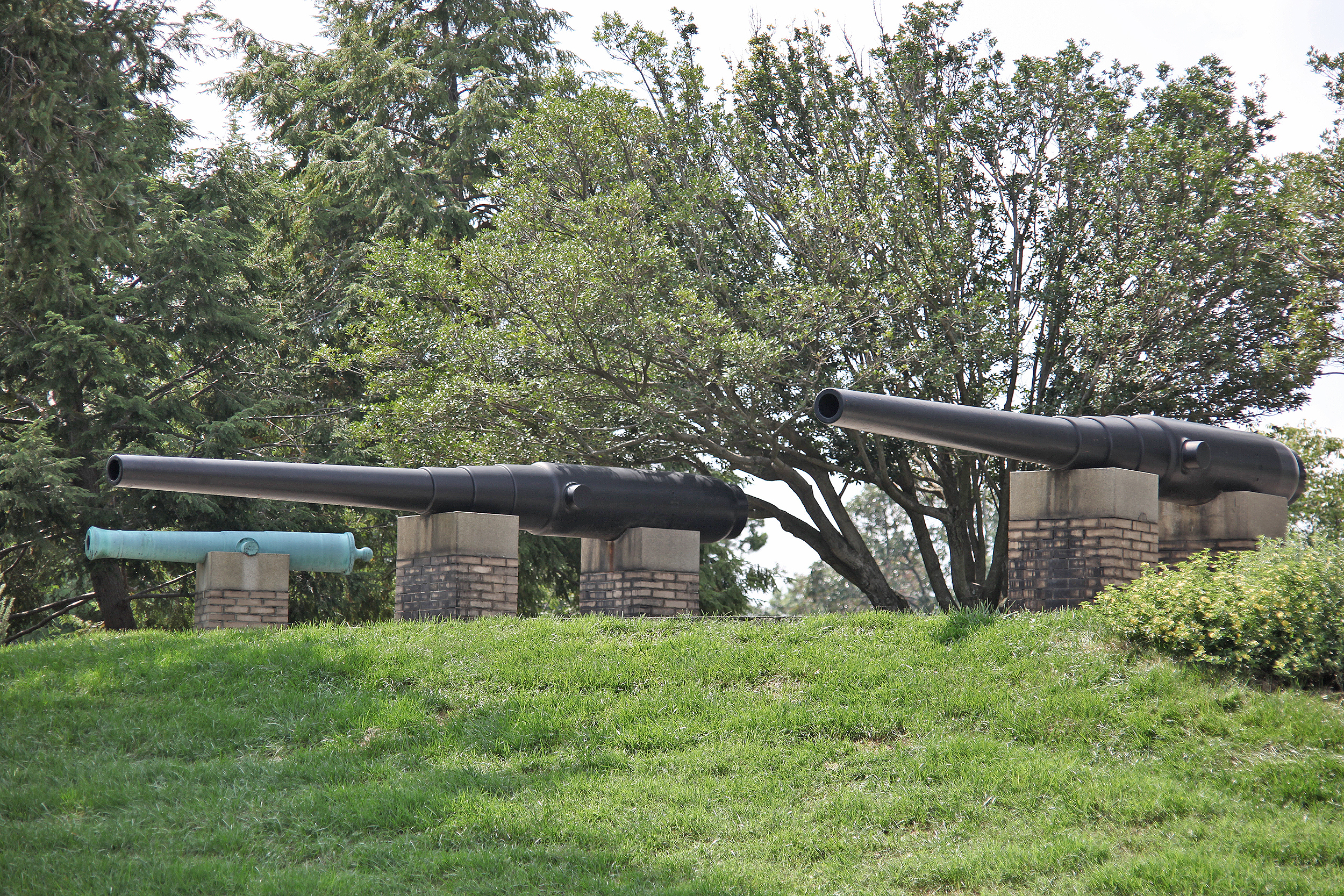
Two 28cm Hontoria guns from the cruisers Infanta María Teresa and Viscaya.

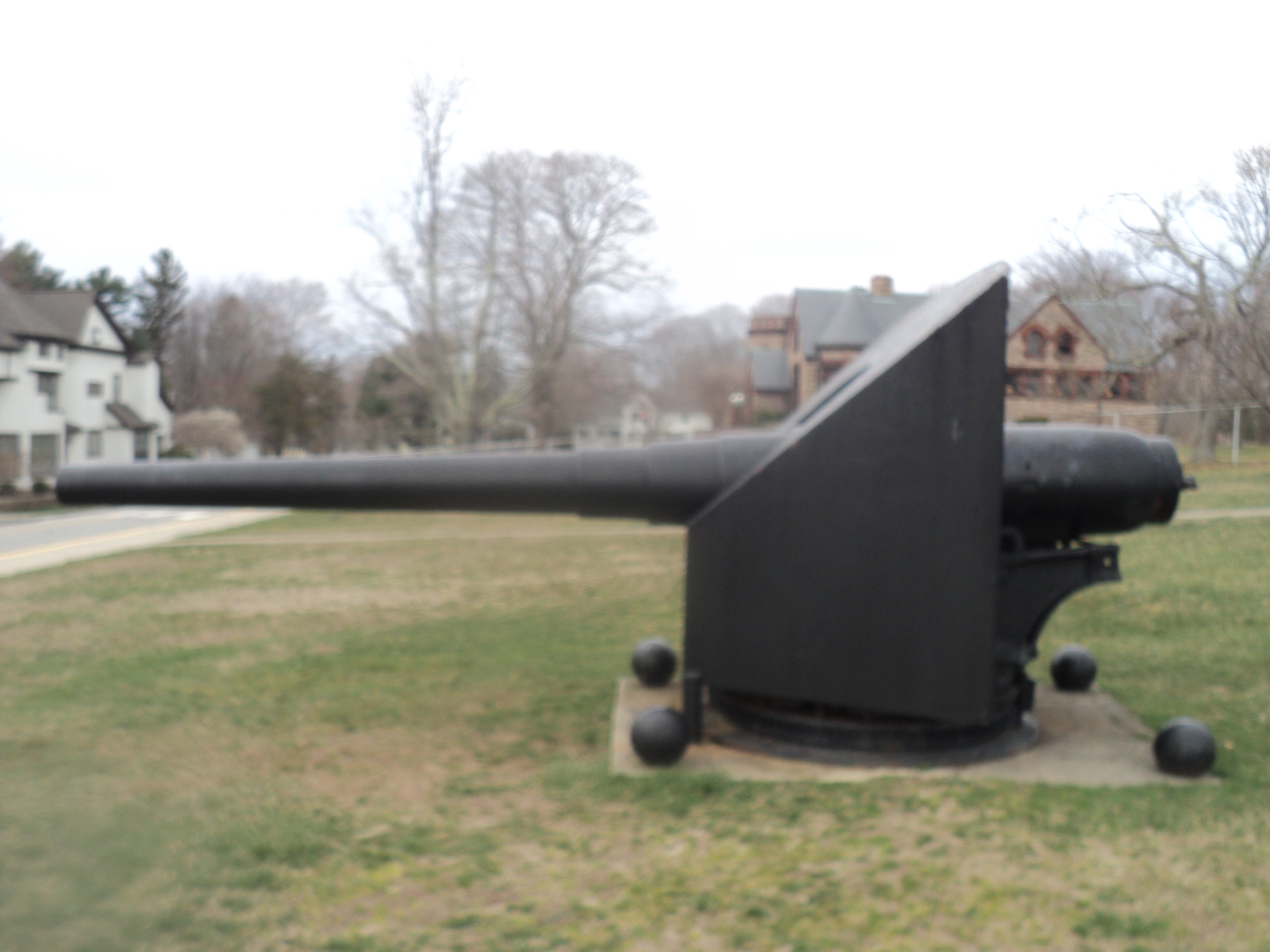
A 140mm González Hontoria rapid-fire gun from the cruiser Infanta María Teresa.

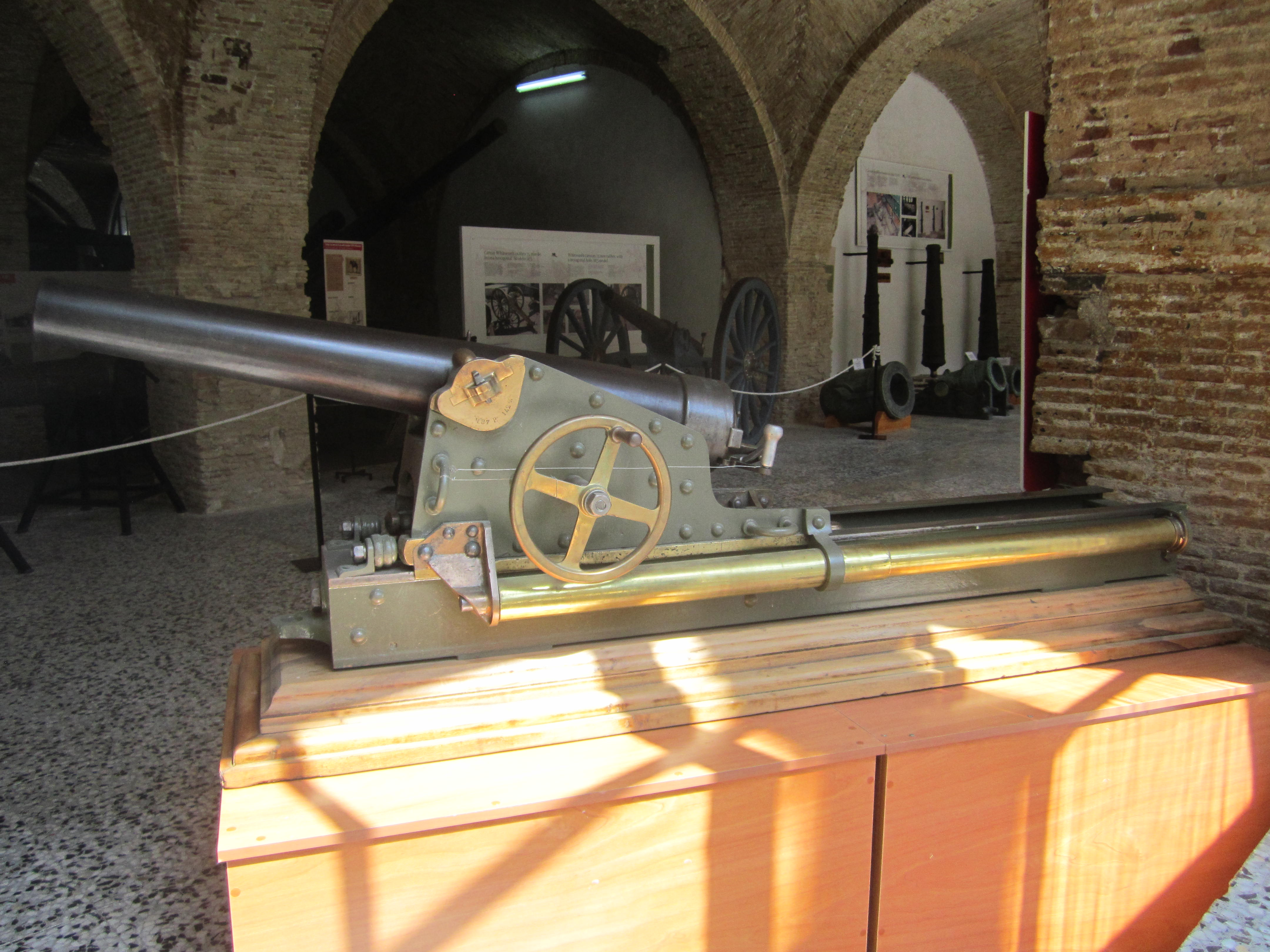
A 7cm Hontoria gun.

== See also ==
- Gonzalez Hontoria de 16 cm mod 1883
- Gonzalez Hontoria de 14 cm mod 1883
- Gonzalez Hontoria de 12 cm mod 1883
- González Hontoria de 7 cm mod 1879
