= USS Isla de Luzon =

Gunboat of the United States Navy

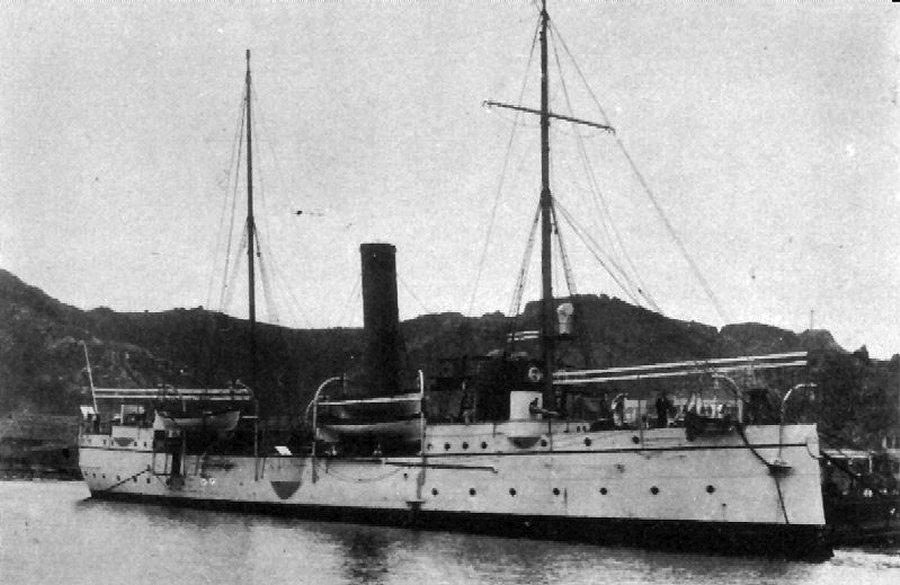

History

United States
- Name: USS Isla de Luzon
- Namesake: The island of Luzon (Spanish Navy name retained)
- Builder: Sir WG Armstrong Mitchell & Company, Elswick, Tyne and Wear, England
- Laid down: 25 February 1886
- Launched: 13 November 1886
- Completed: 22 September 1887
- Acquired: by capture, 1 May 1898
- Commissioned: 31 January 1900
- Decommissioned: 15 February 1919
- Stricken: 23 July 1919
- Fate: Sold into mercantile service, 10 March 1920

General characteristics
- Class & type: Isla de Luzon-class protected cruiser
- Displacement: 950 long tons (965 t)
- Length: 195 ft (59 m)
- Beam: 30 ft (9.1 m)
- Draft: 11 ft 4.75 in (3.4735 m) (mean)
- Propulsion: 2-shaft horizontal triple expansion engine, 535 ihp (399 kW); 2-cylinder boilers; 160 tons coal
- Speed: 11.2 knots (20.7 km/h; 12.9 mph)
- Complement: 137 officers and enlisted
- Armament: 4 × 4 in (100 mm)/40-caliber guns; 4 × 6-pounder quick firing guns; 3 × 14 in (360 mm) torpedo tubes (above water)
- Armor: Deck: 1–2.5 in (25–64 mm)

USS Isla de Luzon was a former Spanish Navy second-class protected cruiser of the same name, captured by and commissioned into the U.S. Navy as a gunboat.

== Service history ==
=== Spanish Navy ===
Isla de Luzon was built in 1886–1887 for the Spanish Navy by Sir W.G. Armstrong Mitchell & Company, Newcastle upon Tyne, United Kingdom as a second-class protected cruiser. She fought in the Battle of Manila Bay in the Philippines during the Spanish–American War in 1898, suffering light damage, and was scuttled after the battle. She settled in shallow water, after which a U.S. Navy boarding party from gunboat USS Petrel went aboard and set her upper works on fire.

The U.S. Navy took possession of her, refloated her, towed her to Singapore and repaired her damage. The Spanish 4.7-inch (120-mm) guns were removed and replaced with 4-inch (102-mm) guns mounted on her forecastle and poop. She was reboilered with Babcock & Wilcox boilers in 1911.

=== United States Navy ===
USS Isla de Luzon commissioned in the United States Navy on 31 January 1900.

Operating out of Zamboanga, Philippine Islands, Isla de Luzon supported naval and land operations against Philippine insurgents. She was a unit of the Southern Squadron that cut off the Philippine insurgents' supplies on Samar; and assisted in the capture of Lukban, the insurgent leader in Samar, and the close blockade of the island of Samar, all of which contributed to the final declaration of armistice.

Isla de Luzon was detached from the Asiatic Station on 15 August 1902, when she departed Cavite for the United States. Following long custom, when she visited Muscat's picturesque harbor, members of her crew painted "Isla de Luzon" on the steep entrance cliff; in later years this was periodically refurbished by visiting ships of the U.S. Navy Middle East Force Command. After transiting the Suez Canal and touching ports of the Mediterranean, she arrived at Pensacola, Florida on 16 March 1903. She was attached to the Pensacola Navy Yard until 6 December 1903, when she was assigned duty with the Louisiana Naval Militia; she was later transferred to the Missouri Naval Militia, and, two years later, to the Illinois Naval Militia on the Great Lakes.

At the beginning of American participation in World War I in April 1917, Isla de Luzon was stationed at Chicago, as a training ship on the Great Lakes. She remained there until 30 September 1918 when she arrived at Narragansett Bay for assignment to the Naval Torpedo Station for duty with the Seamen Gunner's Class. Following the installation of torpedo tubes, she was on range in Narragansett Bay from 13 November 1918 until 13 December 1918.

Isla de Luzon decommissioned 15 February 1919 and was designated as yard craft of the Naval Torpedo Station, Newport, Rhode Island until her name was struck from the Navy List on 23 July 1919. She was sold 10 March 1920 the Bahama & West Indies Trading Co., New York, New York, and renamed Reviver.

== See also ==
- USS Isla de Cuba (1886)
- Photo gallery of USS Isla de Luzon at NavSource Naval History
