= Missouri Naval Militia =

The Missouri Naval Militia is the currently-inactive naval militia of Missouri. Along with the Missouri Army National Guard, the Missouri Air National Guard, and the Missouri State Defense Force, the Missouri Naval Militia is recognized under Missouri law as part of the organized militia of Missouri. Like the members of the National Guard, members of the naval militia who also serve in the Navy Reserve and Marine Corps Reserve have a dual federal and state status, serving as members of the naval militia under authority of the state government until they are called into federal service, at which time they are relieved from their state obligations and placed under federal control for the duration of their federal deployment.

== History ==
The Missouri Naval Militia was created in 1902, and was first organized and deployed in 1903 to guard buildings in East St. Louis near the waterfront after a flood of the Mississippi River. In 1906, the Missouri Naval Militia received USS Huntress, a former private yacht which had been purchased by the federal government to serve in the Spanish–American War.

By 1910, the naval militia was organized into four divisions. In 1910, the Missouri Naval Militia petitioned for, and received, USS Amphitrite from the Navy Department. The transfer of USS Amphirite from the United States Department of the Navy to the Missouri Naval Militia doubled as the summer exercise for the naval militia; naval militiamen were responsible for crewing the vessel from New Orleans to Memphis as sailors from the Navy supervised.

In 1912, the naval militia was deployed by Governor Herbert S. Hadley to assist in rescue operations in Caruthersville following flooding on the Mississippi River. Following the response to the flooding, the naval militia sailed USS Amphirite, which had been taking on too much water in the freshwater environment of the Mississippi River, to Memphis, where it was traded to the Louisiana Naval Militia in exchange for USS Isla de Luzon. USS Isla de Luzon remained with the Missouri Naval Militia until 1915, when it was transferred to the Illinois Naval Militia.

In 1914, sailors from the Missouri Naval Militia served aboard USS Rhode Island alongside naval militia from other states during a training exercise, and practiced firing the 3-inch (76 mm) guns aboard the ship. In 1915, the Missouri Naval Militia participated in a summer drill, serving aboard USS Kentucky, during which time they practiced firing 5-inch (127 mm) guns.

On April 6, 1917, following the declaration of war against Germany by the United States, the Missouri Naval Militia was mobilized in St. Louis. USS Huntress was recalled into federal service, and was sailed to New Orleans by naval militiamen; the remainder of the Missouri Naval Militia was ordered to the Naval Station Great Lakes in Illinois for their federal service.

The naval militia began shifting its planning towards modernization in 1937 when it petitioned the Appropriations Committee of the Missouri State Senate for the funds to purchase heavy duty boats which could be used in flood rescue work.

By 1941, the naval militia was organized into two battalions. The 7th Battalion was based in St. Louis and composed of the 35th, 36th, 37th, and 38th Divisions, and the 8th Battalion was based in Kansas City and composed of the 39th, 40th, and 41st Divisions.

Per Title 10 of the United States Code, naval militia members are allowed to maintain simultaneous membership in federal reserve military forces such as the United States Navy Reserve. In fall 1940, the Navy hagan to call its reserve forces to active duty. As of 6 February 1941, 100 Naval Reservists from the 35th Division were on active duty and assigned to the USS Schley, 100 from the 36th Division on the USS Allen, 100 from the 37th Division on the USS Chew, 100 from the 40th Division on the USS William P. Biddle, and 100 from the 41st Division on the USS Hatfield. 160 men from St. Louis and 120 from Kansas City still remained under state control.

In 1947, the Missouri General Assembly suspended appropriations to the state's naval militia, effectively disbanding it.

== Personnel ==
Naval militias may be equipped by the federal government if they meet federal membership requirements. Under 10 U.S. Code § 7854, in order to be eligible for access to "vessels, material, armament, equipment, and other facilities of the Navy and the Marine Corps available to the Navy Reserve and the Marine Corps Reserve", at least 95% of members of the naval militia must also be members of the United States Navy Reserve or the United States Marine Corps Reserve.

== Legal status ==
Naval militias of U.S. states are recognized by the federal government of the United States under 10 U.S. Code §7851. Missouri law also recognizes the Missouri Naval Militia as a component of the organized militia of Missouri. Due to the extant recognition of the naval militia under state law, an act of legislature by the Missouri General Assembly or an executive order from the Governor of Missouri could return the Missouri Naval Militia to active service.
