= Spanish cruiser Isla de Luzón =

Isla de Luzón
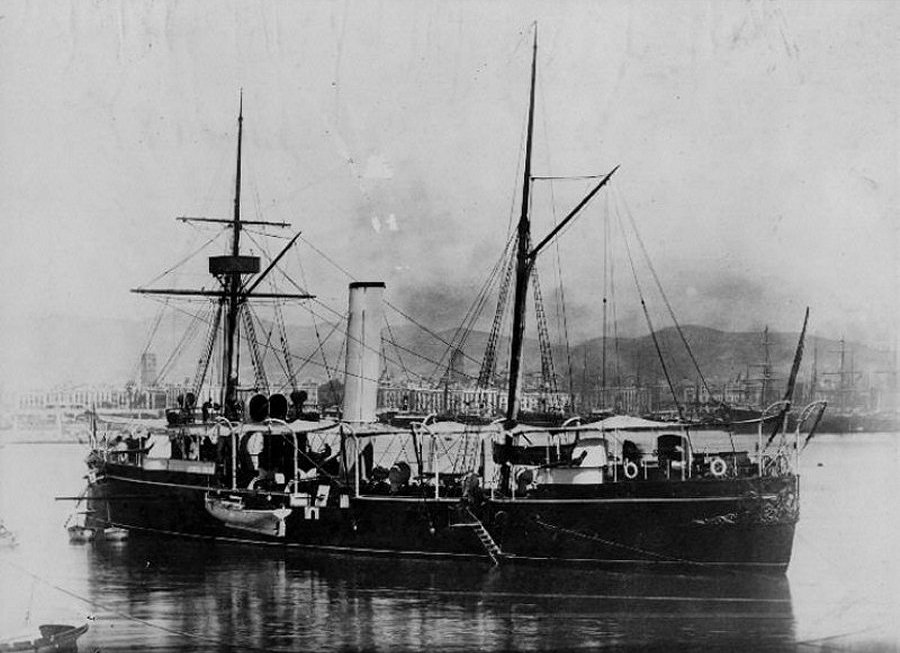
- Isla de Luzón in the late 1880s.

History

Spain
- Namesake: The island of Luzon, main island of the Philippine Islands.
- Builder: Elswick, United Kingdom
- Cost: 2,400,000 pesetas
- Laid down: 25 February 1886
- Launched: 13 November 1886
- Completed: 22 September 1887
- Commissioned: 1887
- Fate: Scuttled 1 May 1898; captured and salvaged by the United States Navy

General characteristics
- Class & type: Isla de Luzón-class protected cruiser
- Displacement: 1,030 tons
- Length: 184 ft 10 in (56.34 m)
- Beam: 29 ft 11 in (9.12 m)
- Draft: 12 ft 6 in (3.81 m) maximum
- Installed power: 1,897 ihp (1,415 kW) (natural draft); 2,627 ihp (1,959 kW) (forced draft)
- Propulsion: 2-shaft horizontal triple-expansion, 2 cylindrical boilers
- Speed: 14.2 kn (26.3 km/h; 16.3 mph) (natural draft); 15.9 kn (29.4 km/h; 18.3 mph) (forced draft)
- Complement: 164 officers and enlisted
- Armament: 6 × 4.7-inch (119 mm) guns; 8 × 6 pdr quick-firing guns; 4 × machine guns; 3 × 14 in (356 mm) torpedo tubes
- Armor: Deck: 2.5–1 in (64–25 mm); Conning tower: 2 in (51 mm)

Isla de Luzón was an Isla de Luzón-class protected cruiser of the Spanish Navy. She served in the Rif War, the Philippine Revolution and the Spanish–American War. During the latter the ship was scuttled at the Battle of Manila Bay, eventually being raised and put into American service as USS Isla de Luzon.

== Technical characteristics ==
Isla de Luzón was built by Elswick in the United Kingdom. She was laid down on 25 February 1886, launched on 13 November 1886, and completed on 22 September 1887. She had a steel hull and one funnel. She had a large beam for her length, and tended to have poor seakeeping qualities, burying her bow into waves. Small for a protected cruiser, she was often called a gunboat by 1898.

== Operational history ==
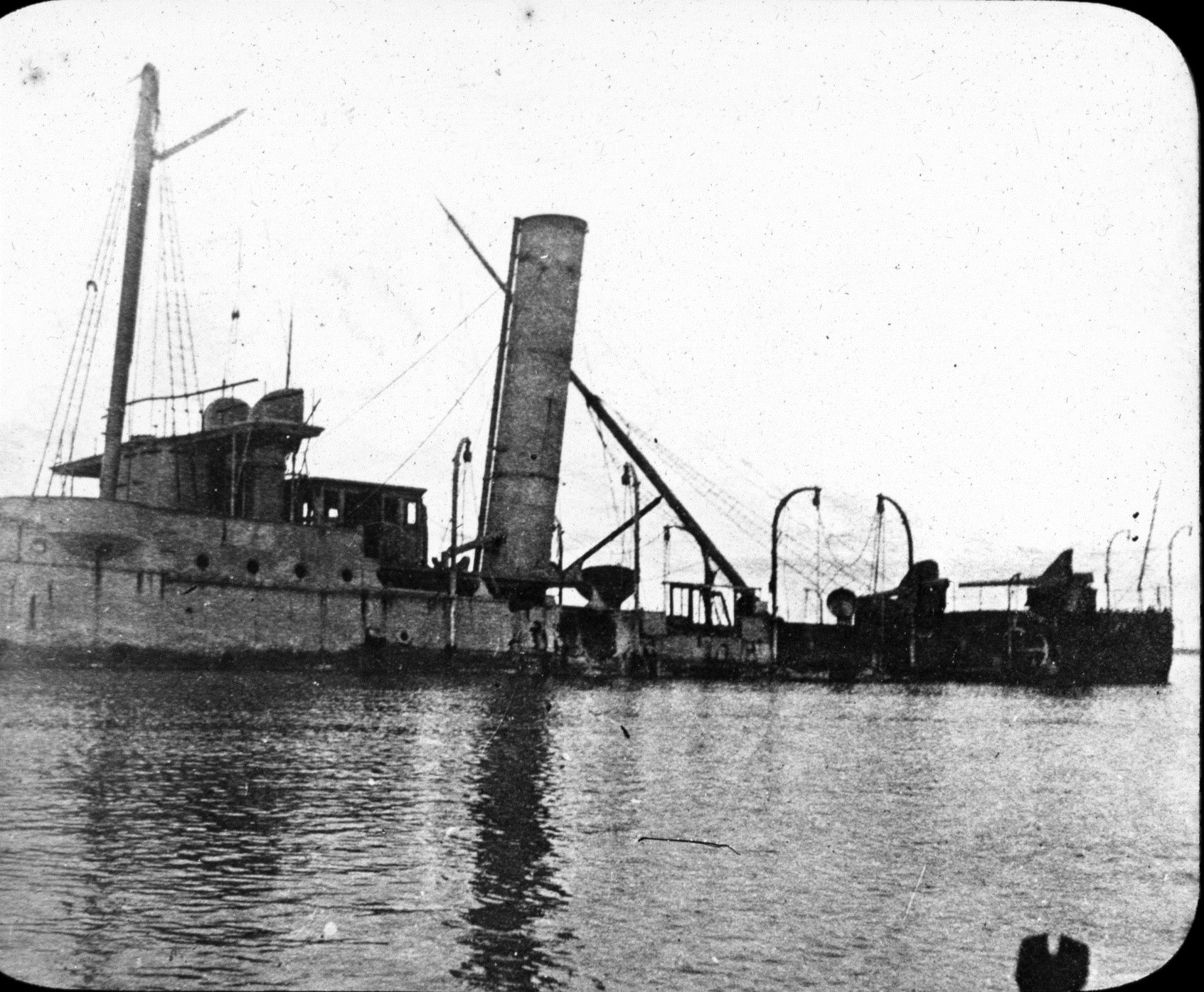
The wreck of Isla de Luzón.

Upon completion, Isla de Luzón joined the Metropolitan Fleet in Spain. She participated in the Rif War of 1893–1894, bombarding the reef between Melilla and Chafarinas. When the Philippine Revolution of 1896–1898 broke out in the Philippines, Isla de Luzón was sent there to join the squadron of Rear Admiral Patricio Montojo de Pasaron.

Isla de Luzón was still part of Montojo's squadron when the Spanish–American War broke out in April 1898. She was anchored with the squadron in Cañacao Bay under the lee of the Cavite Peninsula east of Sangley Point, Luzon, eight miles southwest of Manila, when, early on the morning of 1 May 1898, the United States Navy's Asiatic Squadron under Commodore George Dewey, found Montojo's anchorage and attacked. The resulting Battle of Manila Bay was the first major engagement of the Spanish–American War.

The American squadron made a series of firing passes, wreaking great havoc on the Spanish ships. At first, Dewey's ships concentrated their fire on Montojo's flagship, unprotected cruiser Reina Cristina, and on unprotected cruiser Castilla, and Isla de Luzón suffered little damage. When Reina Cristina became disabled, Isla de Luzón and her sister ship, Isla de Cuba, came alongside to assist her under heavy American gunfire.

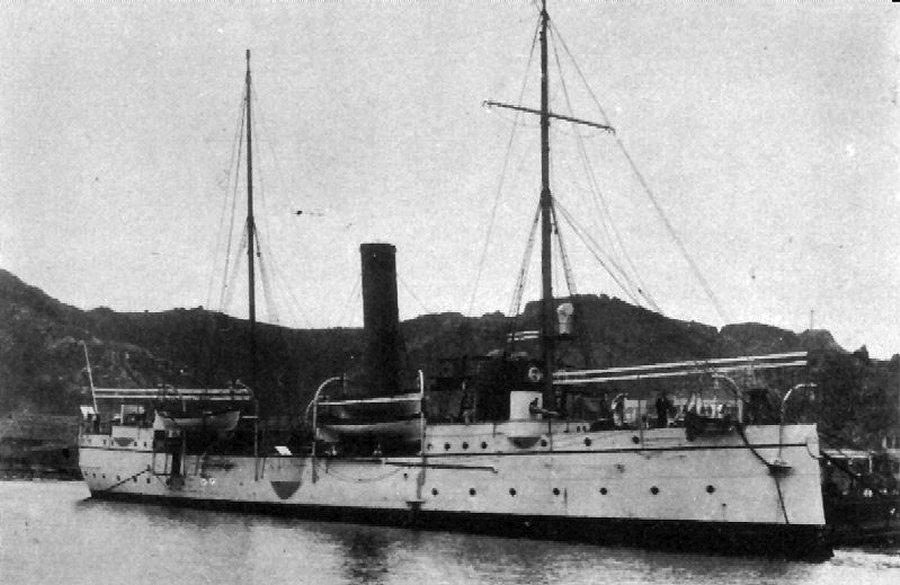
USS Isla de Luzón in 1905.

With Montojo's squadron battered into submission, Isla de Luzón was scuttled in shallow water to avoid capture. She had taken three hits, one of which had disabled one of her guns, and six of her crew had been wounded. After she sank, her upper works remained above water, and a team from gunboat USS Petrel went aboard and set her on fire.

After the United States occupied the Philippines, the United States Navy seized, salvaged, and repaired her and commissioned her as gunboat USS Isla de Luzon in 1900 for service in the United States.

== See also ==
- List of cruisers of Spain
