= USS Reina Mercedes =

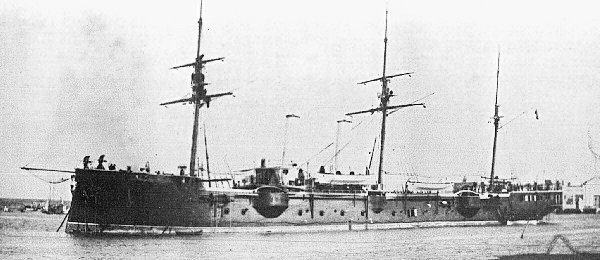
- Reina Mercedes

History

United States
- Name: Reina Mercedes
- Namesake: Spanish Navy name retained; Queen Mercedes of Orléans (1860–1878) was the first wife of King Alfonso XII of Spain
- Builder: Naval shipyard Cartagena, Spain
- Launched: 12 September 1887
- Commissioned: 17 July 1920
- Decommissioned: 6 November 1957
- Stricken: 6 September 1957
- Home port: Newport, Rhode Island; Annapolis, Maryland
- Nickname(s): "Fastest Ship in the Fleet"
- Captured: 17 July 1898
- Fate: Sold for scrapping
- Notes: Served in the Spanish Navy as an unprotected cruiser from 1887 to 1898

General characteristics
- Class & type: Alfonso XII-class unprotected cruiser; In U.S. Navy service, a non-self-propelled receiving ship
- Displacement: 2,835 – 3,090 tons
- Length: 278 ft (85 m) (between perpendiculars); 292 ft (89 m) (overall)
- Beam: 43 ft 3 in (13.18 m)
- Draught: 21 ft 11 in (6.68 m) (mean)
- Propulsion: non-self-propelled in U.S. Navy service
- Complement: 91
- Armament: none in U.S. Navy service
- Armor: none
- Notes: Disarmed after capture and salvage by U.S. Navy; recommissioned as a non-self-propelled ship.

USS Reina Mercedes (IX-25), initially the Spanish cruiser Reina Mercedes, was an unprotected cruiser of the Spanish Navy which was captured in Cuba in 1898 by the U.S. Navy during the Spanish–American War. She was refurbished and used by the U.S. Navy as a non-self-propelled receiving ship at Newport, Rhode Island, and subsequently as a detention vessel and barracks ship for the United States Naval Academy in Annapolis, Maryland, until 1957.

== Captured by U.S. Navy forces ==
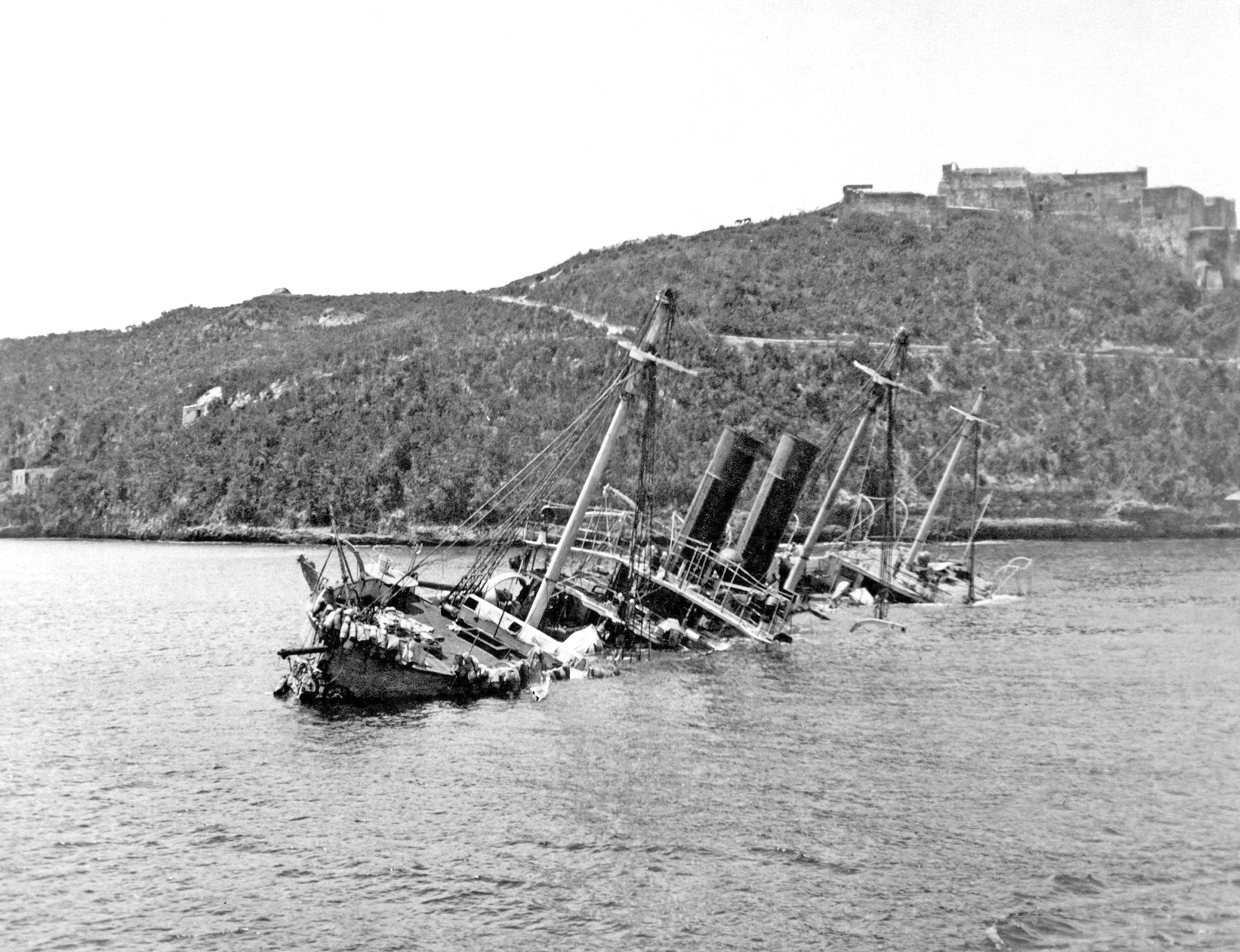

During the Spanish–American War, the ship Reina Mercedes served as a key defensive element of the Spanish defenses against the American blockade of Santiago harbor with four of her six 6.3" Hontoria guns and lighter guns being the teeth of the Spanish land batteries and the ship itself being the first layer of naval defense at the inner entrance of the mouth of the harbor. After the Spanish fleet had come out and been destroyed in the Naval battle of Santiago the Spanish Navy sank Reina Mercedes as a blockship in the entrance channel of the harbor at Santiago de Cuba, on the southeast coast of Cuba. The United States captured Reina Mercedes on 17 July 1898 when the Spanish defenses at Santiago de Cuba surrendered. The U.S. Navy decided to salvage Reina Mercedes, and the Merritt-Chapman & Scott company was engaged to raise her. Work began 2 January 1899 and she was again afloat on 1 March 1899.

Leaking considerably as she had been damaged by no less than three 13" shells from the USS Massachusetts and two 12" hits from the USS Texas when being sunk as a blockship, as well as having incurred significant damage incurred in earlier bombardments, the Reina Mercedes was towed to Norfolk Navy Yard in Norfolk, Virginia, arriving 27 May 1899 for temporary repairs. Departing Norfolk on 25 August 1900, again in tow, Reina Mercedes arrived at the Portsmouth Navy Yard in Kittery, Maine, on 29 August 1900 for refitting.

== Conversion efforts ==
It was first planned to convert the old cruiser to a seagoing training ship; but, after much delay, the Navy Yard received orders on 10 December 1902 to complete her as a non-self-propelled receiving ship. Departing Portsmouth, in tow 21 May 1905, Reina Mercedes was taken to Newport, Rhode Island, to be attached to the receiving ship USS Constellation; and, but for a visit to Boston and to New York City in 1908, served there until 1912.

== Midshipmen service ==
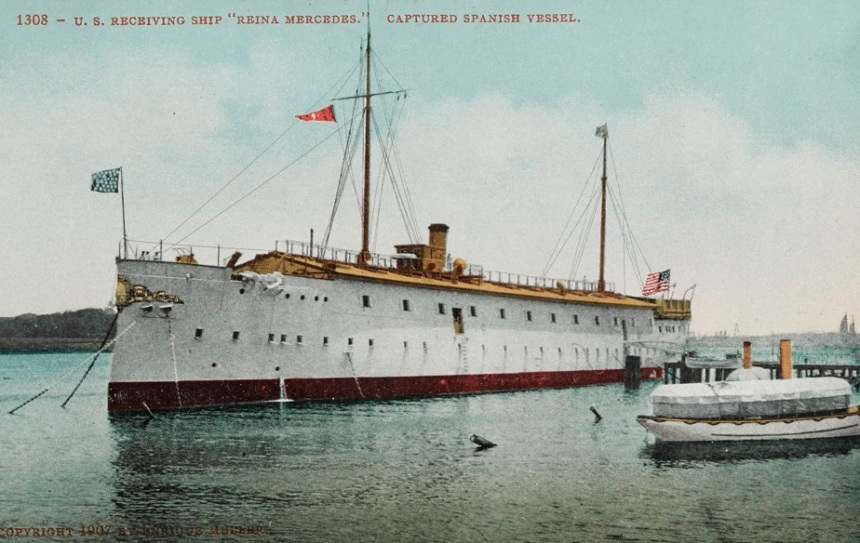
Reina Mercedes, 1907

In early September 1912, Reina Mercedes was towed to Norfolk Navy Yard in Norfolk, Virginia, by the tug USS Patuxent and collier USS Lebanon. After a major overhaul, she arrived at Annapolis, Maryland, on 30 September 1912 for duty there as station ship, replacing USS Hartford in that role. Reina Mercedes was designated an unclassified auxiliary vessel with hull number IX-25 on 17 July 1920.

From 1912 until 1957, USS Reina Mercedes served as the station ship at Annapolis, Maryland, with the exception of brief periods in 1916, 1927, 1939, and 1951 when she was towed to the Norfolk Navy Yard for docking and overhaul.

Until 1940 it was customary for United States Naval Academy midshipmen serving punishment to live and take their meals on board the old ship for up to two months at a time. She was never considered a "brig", as sometimes recalled, for the midshipmen continued to attend all drills and recitations afloat and ashore but were required to sleep in hammocks in the ship and to take their meals on board. This practice was abolished on 5 September 1940, when restriction of midshipmen to their rooms in Bancroft Hall was substituted as a disciplinary measure.

Her main function from 5 September 1940 was to serve as quarters for enlisted personnel assigned to the Naval Academy and for the Commander of the Naval Station, who was also captain of the ship. She also served as the headquarters for the Naval Academy's sailing activities and lookout and harbor control center. Until 1957, Reina Mercedes was humorously referred to as the "fastest ship in the fleet", as she remained tied fast to the Naval Academy seawall.

Because her commanding officer was provided with quarters on board for his entire family, Reina Mercedes was the only U.S. Navy ship on which dependents were permitted to live.

== Flying the Spanish flag once again ==
For a brief moment in 1920, Reina Mercedes flew her former flag—the flag of Spain—as a gesture of friendship when the Spanish battleship Alfonso XIII called at Annapolis.

== Final disposition ==
In 1954 the newly appointed Spanish ambassador to the United States, José María de Areilza, learned of the ship's existence. He began efforts to have Reina Mercedes returned to Spain but was unsuccessful, although he did manage to get the ship discharged. It was the time of the Cold War and Franco's Spain was gaining more and more importance for the US government in its fight against communism, even signing the Pact of Madrid of 1953. Finally, Areilza managed to obtain support from the US Navy itself and got US President Eisenhower to order the ship to be scrapped in 1957. The guards bell was returned to Spain. Reina Mercedes was decommissioned in a ceremony attended by Ambassador Areilza and sold to Boston Metals Co., of Baltimore (Maryland) for scrapping.

== Awards and honors ==
- World War I Victory Medal
- American Defense Service Medal
- American Campaign Medal
- World War II Victory Medal
- National Defense Service Medal
