= Spanish cruiser Reina Mercedes =

Cruiser of the Spanish Navy

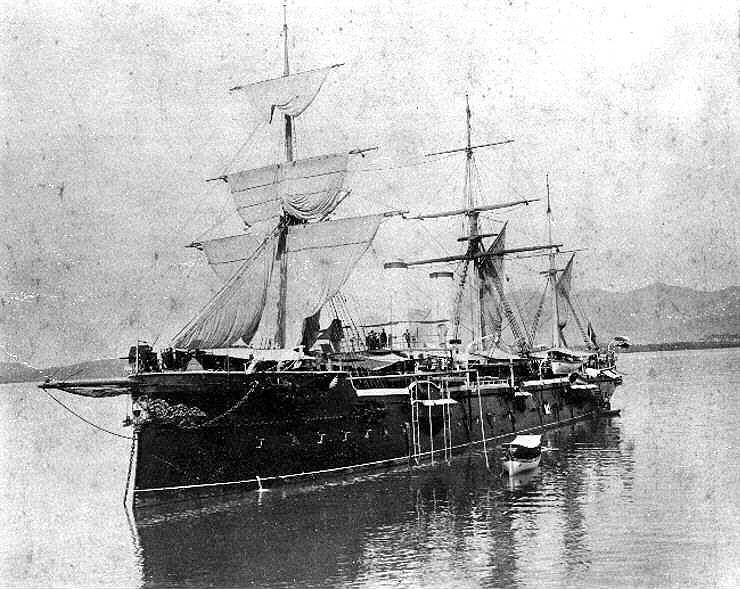
- Reina Mercedes sometime prior to 1898

History

Spain
- Name: Reina Mercedes
- Namesake: Mercedes of Orleans, Queen Consort of Spain.
- Builder: Naval shipyard, Cartagena, Spain
- Launched: 9 September 1887
- Fate: Scuttled as blockship night of 4–5 July 1898; captured and salvaged by US Navy

General characteristics
- Class & type: Alfonso XII-class cruiser
- Displacement: 3,042 tons
- Length: 278 ft 3 in (84.81 m)
- Beam: 43 ft 4 in (13.21 m)
- Draft: 20 ft 0 in (6.10 m)
- Installed power: 4,400 ihp (3,300 kW)
- Propulsion: 1-shaft compound
- Speed: 17 kn (31 km/h; 20 mph) (designed);
- Complement: 370 officers and enlisted
- Armament: 6 × 16-centimetre (6.30 in) guns; 8 × 6 pdr Hotchkiss QF guns; 6 × 3 pdr Hotchkiss revolvers; 5 × 14 in (356 mm) torpedo tubes
- Armor: none
- Notes: 500 tons coal (normal); 720 tons coal (maximum)

Reina Mercedes, was an Alfonso XII-class unprotected cruiser of the Spanish Navy.

During the Spanish–American War, Reina Mercedes was captured by the United States and later salvaged and commissioned into the U.S. Navy. For information about her characteristics and operational history in U.S. Navy service, see USS Reina Mercedes.

== Technical characteristics ==
Reina Mercedes was built by the naval shipyard at Cartagena and launched on 9 September 1887. She had two funnels. Her main armament was built by Hontoria and sponson-mounted. Her five torpedo tubes all were fixed; two were forward, one was on each beam, and one was aft. Although unprotected and therefore lacking armor, she had 12 watertight compartments built in a French-style cellular system to help her resist flooding. She was designed for colonial service, with high speed and moderate armament, but in practice chronic machinery problems made her a relatively slow steamer.

== Operational history ==
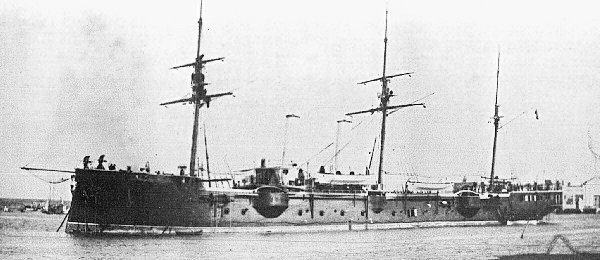
Reina Mercedes

Reina Mercedes spent her early years in Spanish waters as part of the Spanish Navy's Instructional Squadron. In 1893 she was transferred to the Caribbean, where she became flagship of Spanish naval forces operating in Cuban waters. On 29 May 1897, Reina Mercedes fired two shots at the American passenger liner SS Valencia off Guantánamo Bay, Cuba; she ceased fire after Valencia displayed her colors, and it was later discovered that the crew of Reina Mercedes was well aware of Valencia's identity, and fired the shots merely to make her display her colors.

When the Spanish–American War broke out in April 1898, Reina Mercedes was in the harbor at Santiago de Cuba, on Cuba's southeastern coast, awaiting repair, with seven of her ten boilers out of commission. Little of military significance happened at Santiago de Cuba until Vice Admiral Pascual Cervera y Topete's squadron arrived there from Spain on 19 May 1898 to reinforce Spanish forces in the Caribbean. U.S. Navy forces hunting Cervera found his squadron there on the evening of 27 May 1898, and a 37-day blockade of the harbor ensued.

During the blockade, Reina Mercedes traded blows with the American blockaders. On 3 June 1898, the U.S. Navy attempted to trap the Spanish ships in the harbor by sinking the collier USS Merrimac in the entrance channel. Spanish shore batteries disabled Merrimac, and she drifted up the channel toward the anchored Spanish warships; Reina Mercedes, the armored cruiser Vizcaya, and the destroyer Pluton opened fire on Merrimac as well, and the collier soon sank in a position which did not block the channel. Reina Mercedes took aboard as prisoners of war the eight Americans who had been aboard Merrimac.

On 6 June 1898, the blockading U.S. warships bombarded the harbor, hitting Reina Mercedes 35 times, starting two fires aboard her, and killing her second-in-command, Commander Emilio Acosta y Eyermann, the first Spanish naval officer to die in the war.

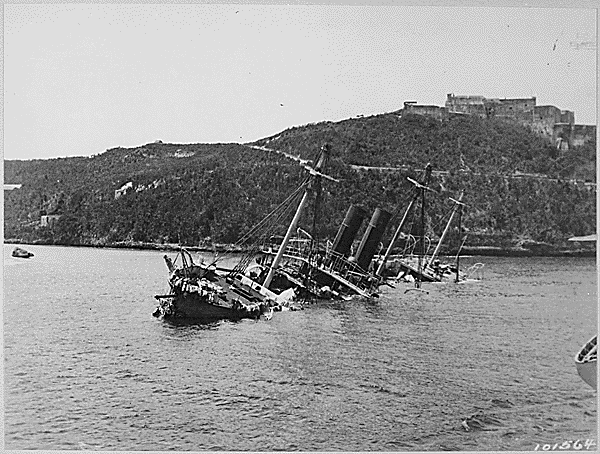
The sunken Reina Mercedes in the channel at Santiago de Cuba.

By the beginning of July 1898, U.S. Army forces advancing overland seemed to be on the verge of capturing Santiago de Cuba, prompting Cervera to order his squadron to attempt an escape by running the blockade. Reina Mercedes could not follow because of her boiler problems. It was decided that most of her guns would be placed ashore to aid in the defense of Santiago de Cuba and that she would be sunk in the entrance channel to prevent her capture and to improve the harbor's defenses by preventing American ships from entering it.

On 3 July 1898, Cervera's squadron attempted its escape, and was completely destroyed in the Battle of Santiago de Cuba. At about 2000 hours on 4 July 1898, Reina Mercedes, by now without most of her guns, slipped her moorings and proceeded into the channel. Just before midnight, the battleship USS Massachusetts spotted her and, together with the battleship USS Texas opened fire. Although Reina Mercedes took many hits, her scuttling crew stayed on course, dropped anchor, and detonated their scuttling charges, but Reina Mercedes drifted to the eastern edge of the channel before sinking, going down in a location that failed to block the channel.

Between 2 January 1899 and 1 March 1899, the U.S. Navy raised her and later put her into service as the disarmed receiving ship USS Reina Mercedes.

== See also ==
- USS Reina Mercedes
