= USS Isla de Cuba =

Gunboat of the United States Navy

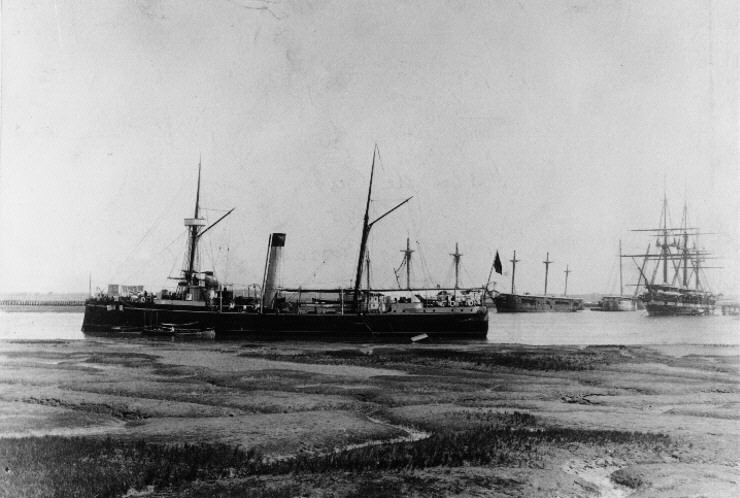
- Isla de Cuba soon after completion, probably in a British port

History

Spain
- Name: Isla de Cuba
- Namesake: The island of Cuba in the Caribbean
- Builder: Sir W.G. Armstrong Mitchell & Company, Elswick, Tyne and Wear, England
- Cost: 2,400,000 pesetas
- Laid down: 25 February 1886
- Launched: 11 December 1886
- Completed: 22 September 1887
- Fate: Scuttled 1 May 1898; captured and salvaged by the United States Navy

United States
- Name: USS Isla de Cuba
- Namesake: The island of Cuba (Spanish Navy name retained)
- Acquired: by capture, 1 May 1898
- Commissioned: 11 April 1900
- Decommissioned: 9 June 1904
- In service: as school ship, March 1907
- Fate: Sold to Venezuela, 2 April 1912

Venezuela
- Name: Mariscal Sucre
- Namesake: Antonio José de Sucre
- Acquired: 2 April 1912
- Fate: Scrapped, 1940

General characteristics
- Class & type: Isla de Luzón-class protected cruiser
- Displacement: 1,038 t (1,022 long tons)
- Length: 195 ft (59 m)
- Beam: 30 ft (9.1 m)
- Draft: 11 ft 4.75 in (3.4735 m) (mean)
- Installed power: 535 ihp (399 kW)
- Propulsion: 2 × horizontal triple expansion engines; 2 cylindrical boilers; 2 × screws
- Speed: 11.2 kn (12.9 mph; 20.7 km/h)
- Capacity: 160 short tons (150 t) of coal
- Complement: 164
- Armament: 4 × 4 in (100 mm)/40 cal guns; 4 × 6-pounder 57 mm (2.24 in) quick-firing guns; 3 × 14 in (360 mm) torpedo tubes (above water)
- Armor: Deck: 1–2.5 in (2.5–6.4 cm)

USS Isla de Cuba was a Isla de Luzón-class protected cruiser of the United States Navy captured from the Spanish Navy during the Spanish–American War. Originally named Isla de Cuba for the Spanish colony of Cuba, the ship was ordered from the British shipbuilding company Sir W.G. Armstrong Mitchell & Company in January 1886 and laid down on 25 February 1886. The ship was launched on 11 December 1886 and completed in 1887. The vessel fought in the Rif War before being assigned to Spain's fleet in the Philippines. When the Spanish fleet in the Philippines was attacked by the United States Navy during the Battle of Manila Bay, Isla de Cuba was scuttled to prevent capture. However, the Americans raised the ship and commissioned her into the United States Navy in 1900 and assigned to the Asiatic Station, keeping the same name. In US service, the ship, rerated as a gunboat, was used to suppress the Philippine Revolution. The vessel was taken out of American service in 1904, becoming a school ship. In 1912, the US sold the ship to Venezuela which renamed her Mariscal Sucre. The ship was scrapped in 1940.

== Characteristics ==
In January 1886, Spain placed orders for two small protected cruisers, Isla de Luzón and Isla de Cuba with the British shipbuilding company Armstrongs to be built at their Elswick, Tyne and Wear shipyard. The ship had a standard displacement of 1,038 tonnes (1,022 long tons), but reached 1,053 t (1,036 long tons) during sea trials. The ship measured 184 feet 10 inches (56.34 m) long between perpendiculars and 197 ft (60 m) overall with a beam of 29 ft 11 in (9.12 m) and a draft of 12 ft 6 in (3.81 m). (Note: Brook has the dimensions of a 30 ft (9.1 m) beam and a draft of 11 ft 6 in (3.51 m).) The ship was powered by steam from two cylindrical boilers fed to two sets of horizontal triple expansion engines constructed by R & W Hawthorn Leslie. At natural draft, the engines were design to create 1,700 indicated horsepower (1,300 kW) with a maximum speed of 14 knots (26 km/h; 16 mph) and 2,200 ihp (1,600 kW) at forced draft with a maximum speed of 15 knots (28 km/h; 17 mph). However, on trials, Isla de Cuba created 1,897 ihp (1,415 kW) at natural draft and reached 14.03 knots (25.98 km/h; 16.15 mph) over six hours and 2,627 ihp (1,959 kW) at forced draft reaching 15.92 knots (29.48 km/h; 18.32 mph) at the measured mile. The ships had capacity for 160 t (160 long tons; 180 short tons) of coal for fuel.

The ship was built with a main armament of six 12-centimeter (4.7 in) guns, with a secondary battery of four 6-pounder (57 mm guns), and three 14-inch (356 mm) torpedo tubes. The ship's protective armor deck had a thickness of between 2 1/2–1 in (64–25 mm), while the ship's conning tower had 2 in (51 mm) of armor. Isla de Cuba had a steel hull and one funnel. Having a wide beam for her length, she had poor seakeeping qualities and tended to bury her bow in waves. The vessel had a complement of 164. (Note: Brook has the complement at 70.)

== Service history ==
=== Spanish Navy ===
Isla de Cuba was laid down on 25 February 1886 by Sir W.G. Armstrong Mitchell & Company at their yard in Newcastle upon Tyne, United Kingdom. The ship was launched on 11 December 1886, and completed on 22 September 1887. Upon completion, Isla de Cuba joined the Metropolitan Fleet in Spain. She participated in the Rif War of 1893–1894, bombarding the reef between Melilla and Chafarinos. When an insurrection broke out in the Philippines, Isla de Cuba was sent there in 1897 to join the squadron of Rear Admiral Patricio Montojo de Pasaron.

She was still part of Montojo's squadron when the Spanish–American War began in April 1898. She was anchored with the squadron in Cañacao Bay under the lee of the Cavite Peninsula east of Sangley Point, Luzon, eight miles (13 km) southwest of Manila, when, early on the morning of 1 May 1898, the United States Navy's Asiatic Squadron under Commodore George Dewey, found Montojo's anchorage and attacked. The resulting Battle of Manila Bay was the first major engagement of the Spanish–American War.

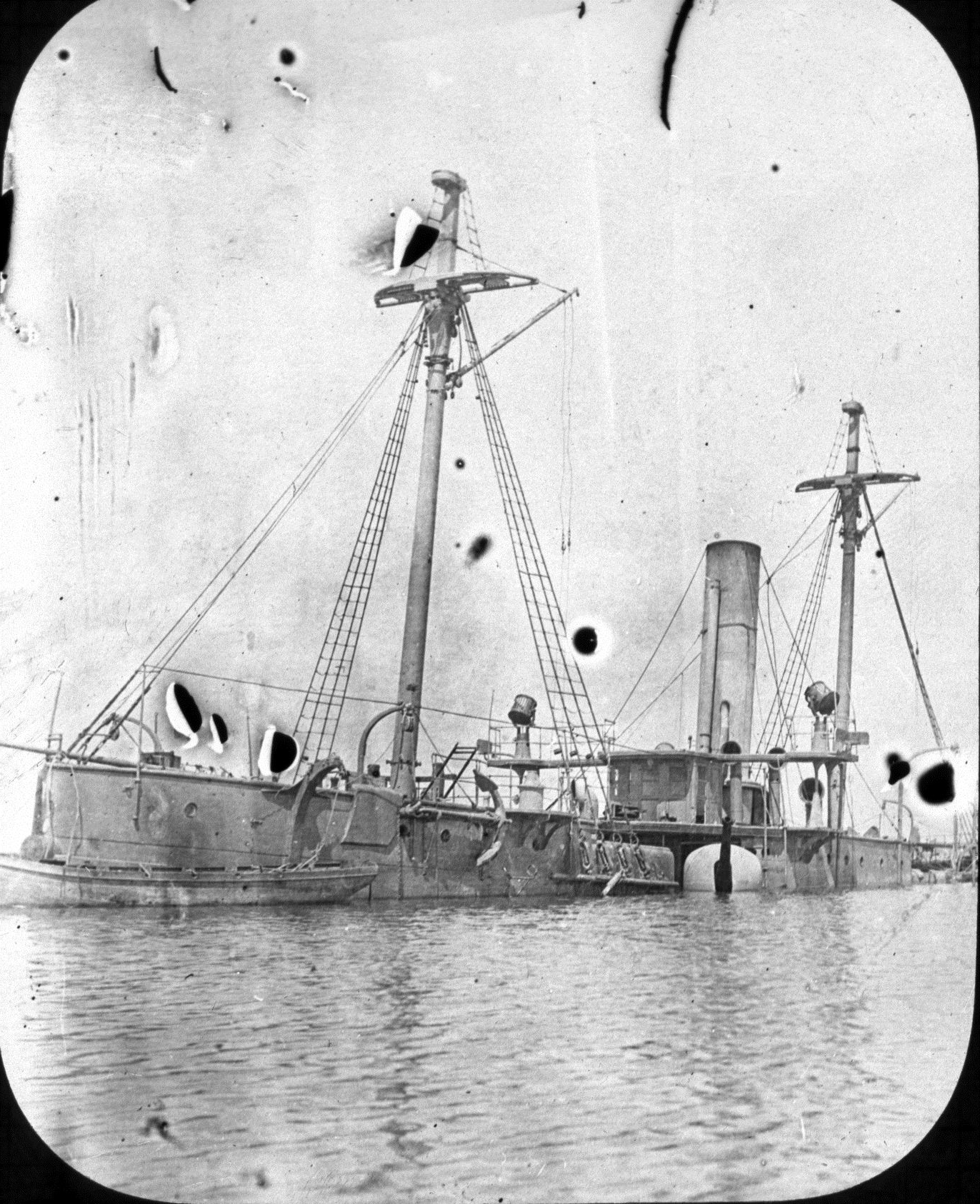
The wreck of Isla de Cuba.

The American squadron made a series of firing passes, wreaking great havoc on the Spanish ships. At first, Dewey's ships concentrated their fire on Montojo's flagship, unprotected cruiser Reina Cristina, and on unprotected cruiser Castilla, and Isla de Cuba suffered little damage. When Reina Cristina was disabled, Isla de Cuba and her sister ship, Isla de Luzón, came alongside the sinking Reina Cristina to assist her under heavy American gunfire. Admiral Montojo shifted his flag to Isla de Cuba. When Montojo's squadron had been battered into submission, Isla de Cuba was scuttled in shallow water to avoid capture. Her upper works remained above the water, and a team from gunboat USS Petrel went aboard and set Isla de Cuba on fire.

After the United States occupied the Philippines, the United States Navy seized, salvaged, and repaired Isla de Cuba. The U.S. Navy took possession of her, refloated her, and repaired her damage. The Spanish 4.7 in (120 mm) guns were removed and replaced with 4 in (100 mm) guns.

=== United States Navy ===
Isla de Cuba was commissioned into the United States Navy on 11 April 1900 at Hong Kong, China. The ship was assigned to the Asiatic Station after undergoing repairs and rerated as a gunboat. Isla de Cuba was used as a supply ship and patrol boat during the Philippine Revolution in the Philippines following the Spanish–American War. In March–April 1900 the ship was part of the Southern Squadron. As part of blockading the island of Samar, Isla de Cuba played a key part in disrupting supplies to the Philippine insurgents' and in abetting the capture of Vicente Lukbán, the insurgent leader in Samar. On 17 November 1900, the ship landed a battalion at Ormoc, Leyte, to hold the town after the garrison had been sent away to deal with Philippine insurgents. The battalion remained at Ormoc until 8 December. In 1901, Isla de Cuba was used as a survey ship to survey Ormoc anchorage and Parasan Harbor.

On 4 March 1904, Isla de Cuba left Cebu, which marked the end of the ship's deployment to the Asiatic Station. The ship returned to the United States where Isla de Cuba was decommissioned on 9 June at Portsmouth, New Hampshire. The ship was repaired at Portsmouth which were completed on 21 March 1907. Isla de Cuba was then loaned to the Maryland Naval Militia for use as a school ship.

=== Venezuela Navy ===
Isla de Cuba was sold at Charleston, South Carolina, to the Republic of Venezuela on 2 April 1912. The vessel was renamed Mariscal Sucre, after Marshall Antonio José de Sucre. Mariscal Sucre served in the Venezuelan Navy until she was scrapped in 1940.

== See also ==
- USS Isla de Luzon (1886)
