= Spanish cruiser Reina Cristina =

1887 Alfonso XII-class cruiser

History

Spain
- Name: Reina Cristina
- Namesake: Maria Christina of Austria, Queen Consort of Spain
- Builder: Ferrol
- Launched: 2 May 1887
- Fate: Sunk 1 May 1898

General characteristics
- Class & type: Alfonso XII-class cruiser
- Displacement: 3,042 tons
- Length: 278 ft 3 in (84.81 m)
- Beam: 43 ft 4 in (13.21 m)
- Draft: 20 ft 0 in (6.10 m)
- Installed power: 4,400 ihp (3,300 kW)
- Propulsion: 1-shaft compound
- Speed: 17 kn (31 km/h; 20 mph) (designed); 10 kn (19 km/h; 12 mph) (operationally)
- Endurance: 500 tons coal (normal); 720 tons coal (maximum)
- Complement: 370 officers and enlisted
- Armament: 6 × 160 mm (6 in) guns; 8 × 6 pdr Hotchkiss QF guns; 6 × 3 pdr Hotchkiss revolving gun; 5 × 14 in (356 mm)torpedo tubes

Reina Cristina was an Alfonso XII-class unprotected cruiser of the Spanish Navy built at the naval shipyard at Ferrol and launched 2 May 1887. Reina Cristina spent her early years in Spanish waters. In 1894 she was transferred to the Spanish Navy's Asiatic Squadron to deter any aggressive moves the German Empire might take against the Spanish-owned Caroline Islands in the Pacific. When Spain faced the "Tagalog Revolt" (1896–1897) – the Spanish name for the first two years of the Philippine Revolution – in the Philippine Islands, Reina Cristina was actively involved in the Spanish campaign to put down the revolt. In addition to patrolling Philippine waters to prevent the smuggling of contraband to the insurgents, she also supported Spanish Army actions against them at Cavite, Novaleta and Binacayan, including the provision of naval gunfire support to Spanish troops ashore.

She was later sunk in the Battle of Manila Bay by the United States Navy's Asiatic Squadron under Commodore George Dewey in the first major engagement of the Spanish–American War.

== Technical characteristics ==
Reina Cristina was built at the naval shipyard at Ferrol and launched 2 May 1887. She had two funnels. Her main armament was built by Hontoria and sponson-mounted. Her five torpedo tubes were all fixed; two were forward, one was on each beam, and one was aft. Although unprotected and therefore lacking armor, she had 12 watertight compartments built in a French-style cellular system to help her resist flooding. She was designed for colonial service, intercepting smugglers and pirates and supporting small naval actions by combining high speed with a moderate level of armament, but due to chronic boiler problems, however, her designed top speed proved unattainable, and in practice her top speed was about 10 knots (19 km/h; 12 mph). Her unarmored design made her unsuited for a pitched battle with the squadron of heavily armed and armored ships she was destined to meet in Manila Bay in 1898.

== Operational history ==
Reina Cristina spent her early years in Spanish waters. In 1894 she was transferred to the Spanish Navy's Asiatic Squadron to deter any aggressive moves the German Empire might take against the Spanish-owned Caroline Islands in the Pacific. She became flagship of the squadron.

When Spain faced the "Tagalog Revolt" (1896–1897) – the Spanish name for the first two years of the Philippine Revolution – in the Philippine Islands, Reina Cristina was actively involved in the Spanish campaign to put down the revolt. In addition to patrolling Philippine waters to prevent the smuggling of contraband to the insurgents, she also supported Spanish Army actions against them at Cavite, Novaleta, and Binacayan, including the provision of naval gunfire support to Spanish troops ashore.

Reina Cristina was the flagship of Rear Admiral Patricio Montojo de Pasaron's Pacific Squadron at Manila in the Philippine Islands when the Spanish–American War broke out in April 1898. At 1100 hours on 25 April 1898, Reina Cristina and the rest of the squadron departed Manila Bay en route Subic Bay, where Montojo thought he could take advantage of a minefield and coastal defense guns in the face of the American naval attack he believed his squadron soon would face. However, when Montojo arrived at Subic Bay, he found that few of the mines had been laid and the coastal battery had not yet been mounted.

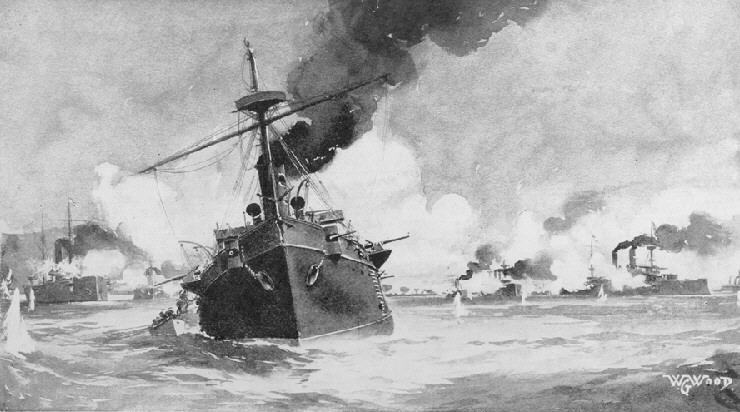
Reina Cristina (foreground) in action against Dewey's squadron (right) in a painting by W. G. Wood. Isla de Cuba and Isla de Luzón at left.

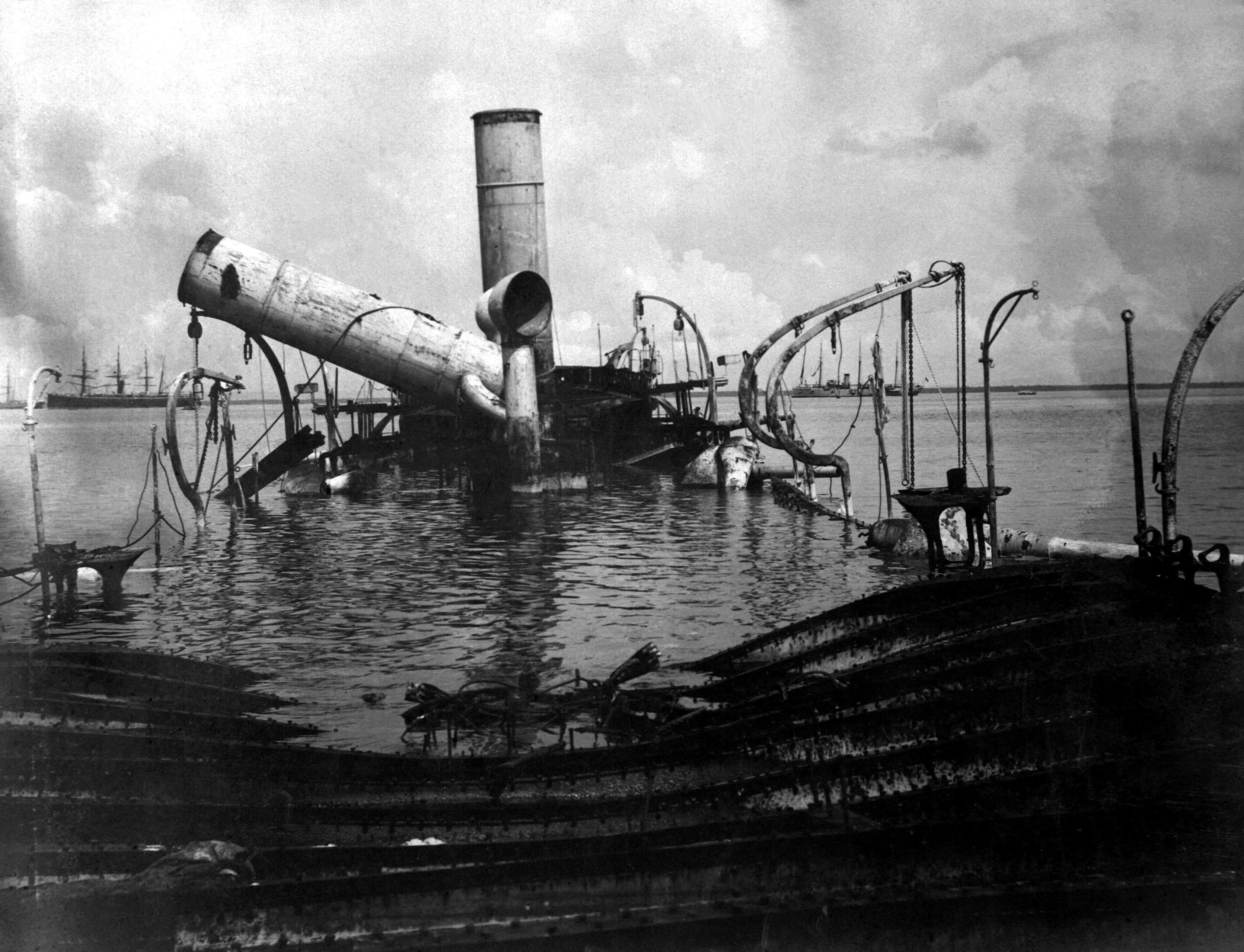
The wreck of Reina Cristina after the Battle of Manila Bay in 1898.

On 28 April 1898 Montojo decided that the Spanish squadron would be better off if it returned to Manila Bay and offered battle at Cavite, where coastal guns could support him and where the shallow water would reduce the loss of life if his ships were sunk. At 1030 on 29 April 1898, Reina Cristina and the rest of the squadron departed Subic Bay. Her squadron mate, the wooden cruiser Castilla, was unable to get underway due to engine trouble, so Reina Cristina took her under tow for the voyage. The squadron arrived at Cavite later that day and anchored in Cañacao Bay under the lee of the Cavite Peninsula east of Sangley Point, Luzon, eight miles southwest of Manila.

At 0400 hours on 1 May 1898, Montojo's squadron was still anchored there when he signalled all ships to prepare for action, and Reina Cristina readied herself to meet an imminent American attack. Just before 0500 hours, the United States Navy's Asiatic Squadron under Commodore George Dewey was sighted, approaching to attack the Spanish ships in their anchorage. In a few minutes, the first shots of the Battle of Manila Bay, the first major engagement of the Spanish–American War, were fired.

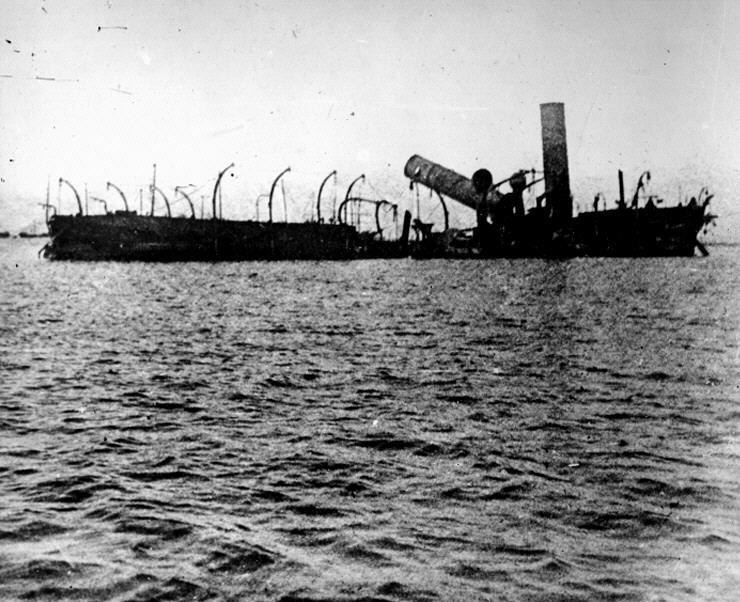
The wreck of Reina Cristina.

Reina Cristina slipped her mooring cables and prepared to maneuver. At 0520 hours, she opened fire along with the rest of her squadron and the Spanish coastal batteries, although Dewey's ships were out of range. Finally, at 0540 hours, the U.S. squadron returned fire, with the protected cruisers USS Olympia, USS Baltimore, and USS Boston concentrating their fire on Reina Cristina. Soon thereafter, Reina Cristina was hit twice in rapid succession as Dewey's squadron steamed past; the hits knocked out several of her light guns and started fires, although her crew quickly put the fires out. The American squadron then reversed course and made a second pass. This time, Reina Cristina's casualties began to mount as she took numerous hits, including to her forecastle and hull; new fires broke out, and Montojo ordered her after magazine flooded to prevent a catastrophic magazine explosion. Dewey's ships then again reversed course and made a third firing pass.

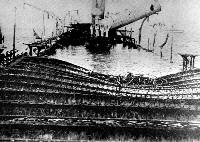
View aboard the wreck of Reina Cristina looking aft. The direction of the leaning funnel suggests the image may be reversed.

As the American squadron again reversed course to make a fourth pass, Montojo ordered Reina Cristina to get underway. She steamed slowly toward Dewey's flagship, Olympia, with an intention of ramming Olympia. This prompted Dewey to order his squadron to close with and concentrate fire on Reina Cristina, and the range of the one-sided fight quickly closed to 1,200 yards (1,100 m). Reina Cristina was soon afire in several places, with most of her guns knocked out, her steering gear shot away, many holes blown in her hull, funnel, and mast, and half of her crew, including seven officers, killed or wounded.

Viewing Reina Cristina as beyond saving and fearing her magazines would explode, Montojo ordered her scuttled and abandoned. The gunboats Isla de Cuba and Isla de Luzón came alongside to take off the wounded as American gunfire continued to pummel Reina Cristina and inflict casualties; among them was Reina Cristina's commanding officer, Captain Luis Cadarso y Rey de Andrade, who refused to abandon ship until all his men were off before him and who was killed by an American shell while overseeing the abandonment of his cruiser. Reina Cristina, a burning wreck, soon sank.

== Commemoration ==
In honor of her performance during the Battle of Manila Bay, Dewey presented the United States Revenue Cutter Service cutter USRC McCulloch with four of the six 3-pounder Hotchkiss revolving guns taken from the wreck of Reina Cristina. These four guns, each of which has five revolving 47-mm barrels, are displayed in pairs to either side of the front of Hamilton Hall facing the parade ground at the United States Coast Guard Academy in New London, Connecticut.
