= George Partridge Colvocoresses =

United States admiral

George P. Colvocoresses
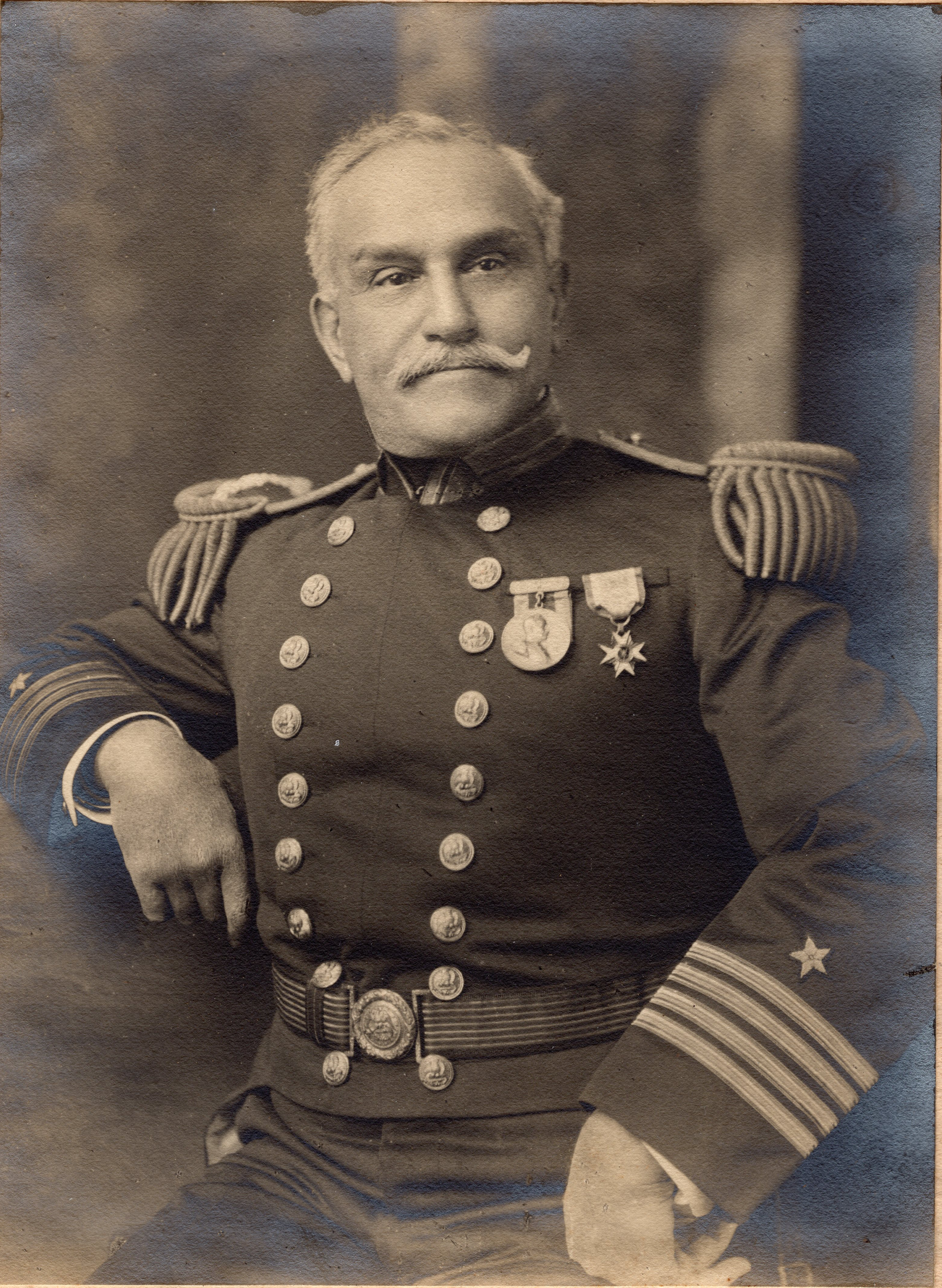
- Colvocoresses c. 1905
- Born: George Partridge Colvocoresses; April 3, 1847; Norwich, Vermont, U.S.
- Died: September 10, 1932 (aged 85)
- Spouse: Minnie D. Colvocoresses
- Children: 3
- Relatives: George Musalas Colvocoresses(father)
- Military career
- Allegiance: United States
- Branch: United States Navy
- Rank: Rear admiral
- Wars: Spanish–American War; Battle of Manila Bay

George Partridge Colvocoresses (April 3, 1847 – September 10, 1932) was a United States Navy rear admiral. He was the son of Captain George Musalas Colvocoresses, the adopted son of Captain Alden Partridge, founder of Norwich University in Vermont and Eliza Freelon Halsey. George Partridge was a graduate of the Norwich University (Class of 1866) and the United States Naval Academy (Class of 1869) and led a distinguished naval career.

== Life and career ==
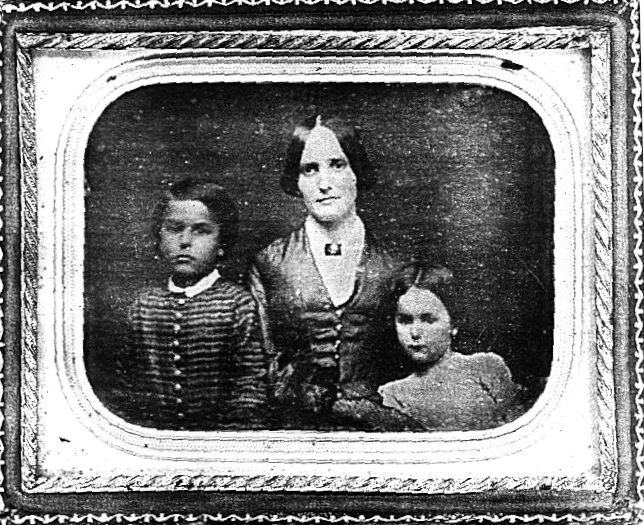
From left to right: George Partridge Colvocoresses age 10, mother Eliza Freelon Halsey Colvocoresses, and sister

George Partridge Colvocoresses was born in Norwich, Vermont, on April 3, 1847. Meant to be a member of the Norwich University class of 1866, Colvocoresses left after the end of his freshman year to serve under his father on the USS Supply.

He entered the United States Naval Academy, then located in Newport, Rhode Island, in 1864, during the American Civil War, and graduated in 1869.

Colvocoresses served on most of the foreign naval stations, and in the Hydrographic Office at Washington, and in 1886 was assistant instructor in drawing at the United States Naval Academy, where he was an instructor in 1893–96 and commandant of midshipmen in 1905–1909.

In 1890, the officers and men of the United States Navy dedicated a granite-and-marble monument to the memory of Lieut. George W. De Long and the crew of the USS Jeannette. Lieutenant George P. Colvocoresses designed the monument—a cross with carved icicles hanging from it that sits atop a cairn. The 24-foot (7.3 m)-high structure is in the U.S. Naval Academy Cemetery overlooking the Severn River.

He distinguished himself in service as executive officer on the cruiser Concord at the Battle of Manila Bay, May 1, 1898, in the Spanish–American War, where the United States won a decisive victory over the Spanish Fleet, helping to end the Spanish naval threat and establish the United States as one of the world's military "super powers."

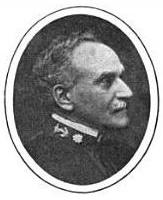
George P. Colvocoresses c. 1900

Commander Asa Walker, commander of the Concord, had the following to say: "Each and every one of my subordinates did his whole duty with an enthusiasm and zeal beyond all praise. I am particularly indebted to the executive officer, Lieut. Commander George P. Colvocoresses, for the cool, deliberate, and efficient manner with which he met each phase of the action, and for his hearty cooperation in my plans."

He participated in the capture of Manila on August 13, 1898, and shortly afterwards, became the executive officer of the cruiser USS Olympia.

In 1899, he became a Veteran Companion of the Pennsylvania Commandery of the Military Order of Foreign Wars. He also became a Companion of the California Commandery of Military Order of the Loyal Legion of the United States.

He was promoted to captain in February 1905, and was retired in the rank of rear admiral on June 30, 1907.

== Personal life ==
Colvocoresses, married Mary Dwight (Minnie) Baldwin she was the daughter of Theodore Eli Baldwin. They had one daughter and two sons: Edith B., Major Harold Colvocoresses U.S.M.C., and George M. (II) Colvocoresses. The son of George M. (II) Colvocoresses, Col. Alden Partridge Colvocoresses, USA, went on to develop the first satellite map of the United States..

In 1919, Rear Admiral Colvocoresses, whose name appears on the Centennial Staircase at Norwich, delivered an address about Captain Alden Partridge on the 100th anniversary of the founding of Norwich University.

Colvocoresses died on September 10, 1932.

== Awards ==
- Dewey Medal
- Civil War Campaign Medal
- Spanish Campaign Medal
- Philippine Campaign Medal

== Dates of rank ==
- Midshipman – 28 September 1864
- Graduated – 4 June 1869
- Ensign – 12 July 1870
- Master – 18 June 1872
- Lieutenant – 1 July 1875
- Lieutenant commander – 4 June 1897
- Commander – 30 June 1900
- Captain – 21 February 1905
- Rear admiral on Retired List – 30 June 1907

Served two years and two months as Captain's Clerk during the Civil War.
