= USCGC Halibut =

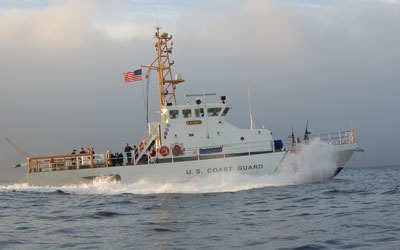

History

United States
- Name: USCGC Halibut
- Namesake: Halibut
- Builder: Bollinger Shipyards, Lockport, Louisiana
- Commissioned: April 26, 2002
- Home port: Marina del Rey, California
- Identification: MMSI number: 366999662
- Status: in active service

General characteristics
- Class & type: Marine Protector-class coastal patrol boat
- Displacement: 91 lt
- Length: 87 ft (27 m)
- Beam: 19 ft 5 in (5.92 m)
- Draft: 5 ft 7 in (1.70 m)
- Propulsion: 2 x MTU diesels
- Speed: 25 kn (46 km/h; 29 mph)
- Range: 900 nmi (1,700 km)
- Endurance: 5 days
- Complement: 12
- Armament: 2 × .50 caliber M2 Browning machine guns

USCGC Halibut (WPB-87340) is a United States Coast Guard Marine Protector-class coastal patrol boat based in Marina del Rey, California. Her patrol area is the 300 miles (480 km) from Morro Bay to Dana Point, California, and several important offshore islands.

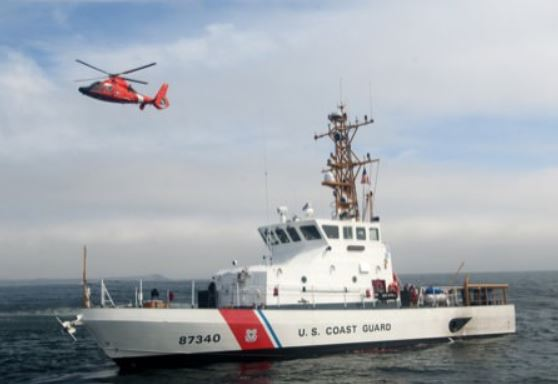
Halibut and a U.S. Coast Guard Eurocopter HH-65 Dolphin helicopter pay tribute over the site of the wreck of the U.S. Coast Guard Cutter McCulloch in the Pacific Ocean off Point Conception, California, in October 2016.

Like her sister ships, Halibut was built at the Bollinger Shipyards, in Lockport, Louisiana.

Commissioned on April 26, 2002, she replaced the Point-class cutter USCGC Point Bridge (WPB 82338). She was commissioned on 26 April 2002.

In the early morning of 2 December 2012, Halibut encountered a suspicious vessel and dispatched her pursuit boat to investigate. The crew of the pursuit boat hailed the vessel and attempted to board her for an inspection, upon which the suspicious vessel rammed Halibut′s boat. Senior Chief Petty Officer Terrell Horne, Halibut's executive petty officer, was credited with heroically pushing a colleague to safety at the cost of his own life.

In October 2016, Halibut joined the Coast Guard patrol boat USCGC Blacktip (WPB-87326) in supporting operations by National Oceanic and Atmospheric Administration (NOAA) personnel aboard the Channel Islands National Marine Sanctuary′s research vessel R/V Shearwater who used a VideoRay Mission Specialist remotely operated vehicle to find and identify the wreck of the Coast Guard cutter McCulloch, which sank in the Pacific Ocean 3 nautical miles (5.5 km) off Point Conception, California, on 13 June 1917 after colliding with the passenger steamer Governor.
