= SeaTrepid =

SeaTrepid International, LLC
- Type: LLC
- Founded: 2003
- Headquarters: Robert, Louisiana, United States
- Website: http://www.SeaTrepid.com

SeaTrepid International, LLC is an underwater engineering and service company located in Robert, Louisiana, providing underwater robotic solutions for the Oil and Gas industry, and other underwater industries.

== Corporate history ==
In 1999, Robert (Bob) Christ co-founded VideoRay LLC with Scott Bentley, developing and manufacturing micro underwater remotely operated vehicles (ROVs). Bob founded SeaTrepid in 2003 as an ROV consulting service in Southeastern Pennsylvania. Early customers included the US Coast Guard, Army, and Navy.

In early-2006, SeaTrepid began consulting with Oil & Gas customers in the Gulf of Mexico, primarily to assist with the cleanup and repair work needed after the damage done by hurricanes Katrina and Rita in late-2005. In order to meet this demand, SeaTrepid relocated its offices to Hammond, Louisiana in 2006. In December 2007, SeaTrepid purchased a 6.25 acre property in Robert, Louisiana to accommodate large increases in personnel and assets.

In 2009, SeaTrepid changed its name to SeaTrepid International LLC. A new building was built on the Robert property, over doubling the size of SeaTrepid's facilities. The new facility helped enable SeaTrepid to support larger ROV operations.

SeaTrepid added mid-class ROVs to its fleet in 2010, and work class ROVs in 2012 and 2013.

== Services ==
=== Offshore ===
SeaTrepid operates observation and mid-size submersible ROV systems. SeaTrepid started with small inspection class vehicles, providing diver support and platform inspections in the Gulf of Mexico in early 2006. The company's rapid growth can be attributed to their willingness to perform tasks with small ROVs that have traditionally been done by large ROVs or divers. They will commonly install sensors and tooling on their smaller ROVs that are usually found only on larger systems.

As the company grew, SeaTrepid expanded into larger ROV systems. Their current ROV fleet includes micro-ROVs, observation, mid-class and light work-class ROVs.

=== Inland ===
SeaTrepid provides search and rescue, pipe inspection, tank inspection, and other inland services using inspection class and micro-ROVs. SeaTrepid's land based jobs increased rapidly and in 2009.

== Facilities ==
SeaTrepid currently resides on a 6.25 acre property in Robert, Louisiana. Following the completion of major renovations in June 2009, the property contains multiple buildings with a large equipment warehouse, equipment design/testing/repair workshop, training facilities, as well as administrative offices and housing and parking for offshore employees. They also have a large in ground testing pool, which is used to test current and prototype ROVs, and rented out to other companies for equipment testing and diver training.

== Public Exposure ==
=== Expeditions ===
SeaTrepid has assisted in expeditions let by Robert H. Rines to explore Loch Ness in Scotland.

=== TV ===
In Season 2 Episode 2 of "Oil, Sweat and Rigs", a Discovery channel series, a large portion of the underwater footage was provided by SeaTrepid ROVs and from their video archive.

The History Channel followed SeaTrepid on its latest expedition to explore Loch Ness. Footage was featured in Season 4 of Monster Quest in the episode "Death of Loch Ness". The discovery of golf balls at the bottom of the Loch also got attention from news agencies such as CNN.
