= USS Pillsbury (DD-227) =

United States Navy destroyer (1920–1942)

Coordinates: 14°30′S 106°30′E

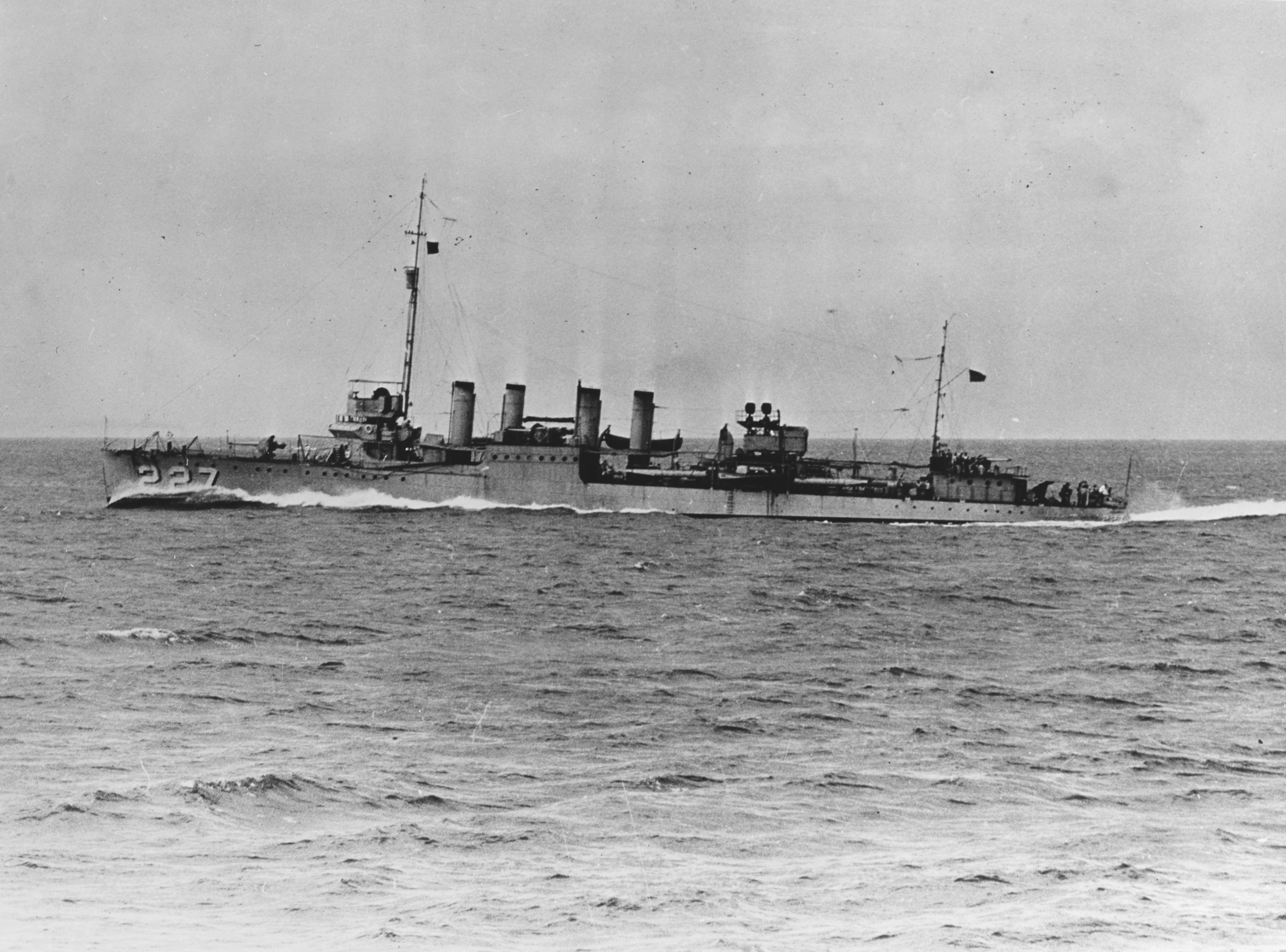
- USS Pillsbury (DD-227) circa in 1930

History

United States
- Name: USS Pillsbury
- Namesake: John E. Pillsbury
- Builder: William Cramp & Sons, Philadelphia
- Yard number: 493
- Laid down: 23 October 1919
- Launched: 3 August 1920
- Commissioned: 15 December 1920
- Honours and awards: 2 battle stars (World War II)
- Fate: Sunk 2 March 1942

General characteristics
- Class & type: Clemson-class destroyer
- Displacement: 1,190 long tons (1,209 t)
- Length: 314 ft 4 in (95.81 m)
- Beam: 30 ft 8 in (9.35 m)
- Draft: 9 ft 3 in (2.82 m)
- Propulsion: Geared turbines; 26,500 shp (19.8 MW); 2 screws
- Speed: 35 knots (65 km/h; 40 mph)
- Complement: 116 officers and enlisted
- Armament: 4 × 4 in (100 mm) guns; 1 × 3 in (76 mm) gun; 12 × 21 inch (533 mm) torpedo tubes

USS Pillsbury (DD-227) was a Clemson-class destroyer of the United States Navy that served during World War II and the first of two ships named after John E. Pillsbury, a rear admiral in the U.S. Navy (USN). She was sunk by Japanese cruisers about 200 miles east of Christmas Island on or around 2 March 1942 with all hands, one of two major American surface warships lost in World War II with no survivors.

== History ==
Pillsbury was laid down by William Cramp & Sons of Philadelphia on 23 October 1919, launched on 3 August 1920, sponsored by Miss Helen Langdon Richardson, and commissioned on 15 December 1920.

During service in the Asiatic Fleet, Pillsbury was involved in the 1927 Nanking incident as part of a USN flotilla helping protect American interests around the Yangtze River. On 27 November 1941, by order of the Commander Asiatic Fleet, Admiral Thomas C. Hart, Pillsbury departed Manila under the command of Lt. Commander Harold C. Pound, together with other units of the fleet. When the Japanese struck at Pearl Harbor on 7 December 1941, she was operating in the vicinity of Borneo.

After the attack on Pearl Harbor, Pillsbury, together with other U.S., Dutch, and Australian naval vessels, operated out of Balikpapan on reconnaissance and antisubmarine patrols. Later, she moved to Surabaya, Java, and from there made night patrols with the cruisers Houston (CA-30) and Marblehead (CL-12) and destroyers of Division 58.

On 18 February the Japanese began moving ashore on Bali and the American-British-Dutch-Australian Command (ABDA) surface forces including Pillsbury set out to disrupt further landings from a Japanese convoy reported to be in the area.

While steaming through Badoeng Strait on the night of 19/20 February during the Battle of Badoeng Strait, Pillsbury fired three torpedoes at a Japanese ship without result. When a searchlight was trained on Pillsbury and several shots were fired at her, but she turned to starboard and made smoke to escape. The relatively small Allied forces chose to make brief strikes then rapid retirement in the face of superior Japanese forces in the hope of disrupting the enemy advance.

At 02:10, Pillsbury sighted a ship ahead and engaged with her main battery and .50-caliber guns. The amidships gun crew of the Japanese ship was put out of action by the first burst of .50-caliber machine guns. The target ship then received a direct hit with a shell from either Pillsbury or the destroyer in the opposite column. This caused the Japanese destroyer to swing to starboard. The spotter then observed three hits from Pillsbury - one on the bridge, one amidships, and one on the fantail. After this hit, the Japanese ship was in flames and ceased firing.

At this time, Pillsbury and Parrott (DD-218) were detached from the strike force and sent to Tjilatjap. After the action around Bali, the ships had few torpedoes and badly needed an overhaul.

== Fate ==
A few days later, Pillsbury was sunk. No US logs or battle reports give the details of the actions in which Pillsbury, Asheville (PG-21), and Edsall (DD-219) were lost and their fates were unknown until Japanese logs were examined after the war. A force of Japanese ships was operating to the south of Java to prevent the escape of Allied ships from the area. The force consisted of four battleships, five cruisers of Cruiser Division 4, the aircraft carriers Akagi, Kaga, Sōryū, and Hiryū, and the destroyers of Destroyer Squadron 4.

Edsall was sunk in the Indian Ocean on 2 March 1942, south of Java. At 18:24, she received a direct hit from the battleship Hiei and at 18:35, another from the cruiser Tone. Edsall was also attacked by nine Aichi D3A dive bombers from Sōryū and eight from Akagi, which hit her with several bombs, leaving her dead in the water by 18:50. She was destroyed by the cruiser Chikuma and sank at 19:00 with five to eight survivors. The remains of five executed sailors from the Edsall were recovered in Indonesia in 1952.

In a night surface action on 2 March 1942, Pillsbury was overtaken by two Japanese cruisers of Cruiser Division 4. She was engaged by Takao and Atago, and at 21:02, she sank with the loss of all hands.

Asheville, slowed by engine troubles, was caught at 09:06 on 3 March by the destroyers Arashi and Nowaki and sunk. One crew member was rescued from the water, but died in a prisoner of war camp. All three sinkings took place about 200 miles east of Christmas Island.

Pillsbury received two battle stars for World War II service.
