= Admiral Walker (disambiguation) =

Admiral Walker (1898–2001) was an American Negro league pitcher. Admiral Walker may also refer to:

- Alasdair Walker (1956–2019), British Royal Navy surgeon vice admiral
- Arthur Horace Walker (1881–1947), British Royal Navy rear admiral
- Asa Walker (1845–1916), U.S. Navy rear admiral
- Baldwin Wake Walker (1802–1876), British Royal Navy admiral
- Frank R. Walker (1899–1976), U.S. Navy rear admiral
- Harold Walker (Royal Navy officer) (1891–1975), British Royal Navy admiral
- James Walker (Royal Navy officer) (1764–1831), British Royal Navy rear admiral
- John Grimes Walker (1835–1907), U.S. Navy rear admiral
- Robyn Walker (born 1959), Royal Australian Navy rear admiral
- Thomas Walker (naval officer) (1916–2003), U.S. Navy vice admiral

== See also ==
- Algernon Walker-Heneage-Vivian (1871–1952), British Royal Navy admiral
- Frederic Wake-Walker (1888–1945), British Royal Navy admiral
- General Walker (disambiguation)
