= Columbia River Quarantine Station =

- U.S. National Register of Historic Places
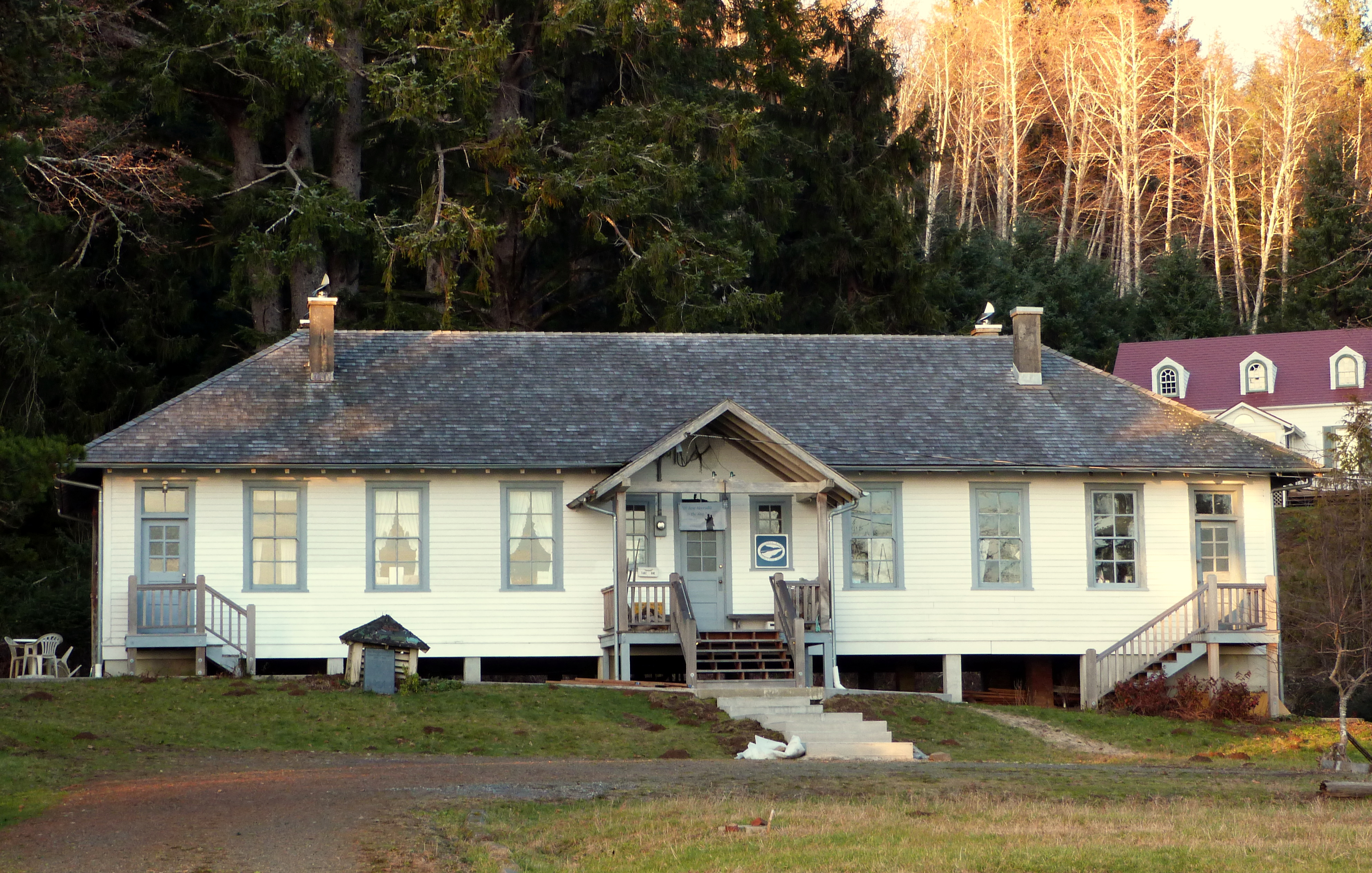

- Location within Washington (state) Location within the United States
- Nearest city: Knappton, Washington
- Coordinates: 46°16′15″N 123°49′40″W
- Area: 1.8 acres (0.73 ha)
- Built: 1899
- NRHP reference No.: 80004007
- Added to NRHP: February 8, 1980

The Columbia River Quarantine Station, now known as the Knappton Cove Heritage Center, is a historic site in Knappton, Washington. The station provided fumigation and quarantine services to maritime vessels at the port on the Columbia River from 1899 to 1938, and is the sole remaining quarantine station on the West Coast of the United States as all others were burned for fear of contamination. It was added to the National Register of Historic Places in 1980.

== History ==
In the late nineteenth century, regulations on immigration to the United States were increasing. There were four west coast ports where immigrants could enter the United States: San Diego and San Francisco in California, Astoria, Oregon, and Port Townsend, Washington. Federal legislation in 1891 required medical inspections for arriving immigrants. Ships arriving at the port of Astoria on the Columbia River had to travel to the disinfecting station in Port Townsend, 275 miles (443 km) away, if disease was found on board. The communities of Astoria and Portland agitated for closer quarantine and disinfecting facilities, but did not want them too close and so proposed a site across the river.

The location selected for the station was Knappton Cove, which had a defunct fish cannery with a wharf and buildings that could be converted. The government purchased the site for $8,000 (equivalent to US$245,856 in 2019), over the objections of the Washington residents. The station was established May 9, 1899. The building which had served as the cannery superintendent's house became the residence for the quarantine station caretaker. A new building for disinfecting ships was built in 1900, and a hospital (also known as a lazaretto or pesthouse) for ill crew and passengers was added in 1912.

The first physician at Columbia River Quarantine Station was Assistant Surgeon Hill Hastings. He was succeeded several months later by Dr. Bayles H. Earle of the United States Marine Hospital Service. Earle was replaced by Passed Assistant Surgeon John Milton Hold in 1906, and in 1911, Assistant Surgeon Jay Tuttle took Hold's place.

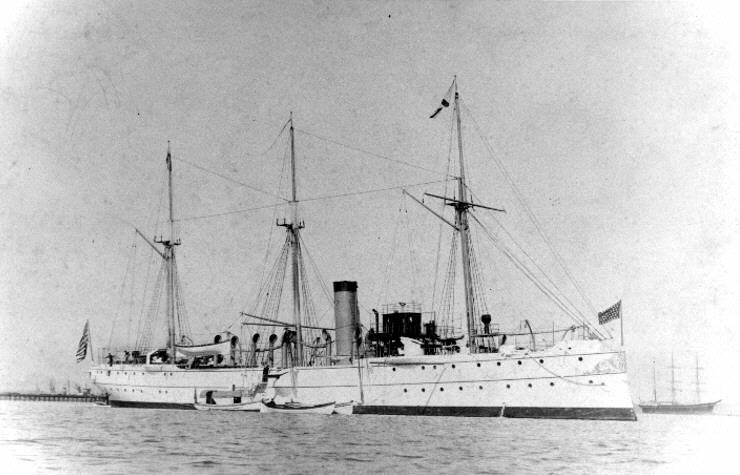
USS Concord housed passengers and crew while ships were fumigated.

Ships anchoring at Astoria were inspected for infestation and communicable diseases. When either were found, the ships were sent to Knappton Cove where passengers went ashore for showers and delousing of their clothing and baggage while the ship was fumigated. Sick passengers would be isolated. To fumigate the ships, which took about 48 hours, pots of sulfur were burned throughout the ship. Initially, those crewmembers and passengers who were not ill slept in tents until they were able to board the ship again. From 1915 to 1929, the USS Concord was moored at Knappton to provide lodging.

During its first year of operation, Columbia River Quarantine Station screened 6,120 people from 97 sailing vessels and 35 steam vessels.

The Sunday Oregonian described the station in 1921:

Before any vessel coming from a foreign port can discharge or load cargo in the Columbia River it must pass quarantine at Astoria. The 'Ellis Island' for this district is situated on the Washington side of the river, near Knappton; and consists of a dock, disinfecting building and appliances, quarters, hospital, detention quarters, etc. ...Thanks to the vigilance of the quarantine on the Columbia River our cites have yet to experience the plague.

During the 1920s, the number of immigrants decreased and new methods of disinfecting ships while at anchor reduced the need for the quarantine station. The Columbia River Quarantine Station was phased out in 1938.

== Later uses ==
For a short time after 1938, the Bureau of Lighthouses made use of the quarantine station site for a navigational aid site. The U.S. Public Health Service declared the station surplus and transferred ownership to the U.S. Coast Guard in 1942. In 1950, the property was sold at public auction to Clarence and Katherine Bell of Portland.

The Bell family operated the site as a fishing camp and moorage site, Knappton Cove Camp, in the 1950s. The camp closed in the 1960s, and the wharf was destroyed by a storm in 1971. In 1995, the station was repurposed as a museum, the Knappton Cove Heritage Center. Students of historic preservation at Clatsop Community College assisted with renovations. In 2017, the museum, now run by a nonprofit group, received a $5,000 grant from the National Trust for Preservation.
