= USCGC Blacktip =

United States Coast Guard patrol boat

- Blacktip arriving at its new homeport in Valdez, Alaska in July 2025.

History

United States
- Name: Blacktip
- Namesake: Blacktip shark
- Operator: United States Coast Guard
- Builder: Bollinger Shipyards, Lockport, Louisiana
- Commissioned: 2000
- Home port: Oxnard, California (until 2025); Valdez, Alaska (since 2025)
- Identification: Hull number: WPB-87326
- Status: In active service

General characteristics
- Class & type: Marine Protector-class patrol boat
- Displacement: 100 long tons
- Length: 87 ft (27 m)
- Beam: 19.5 ft (5.9 m)
- Speed: 25 knots (46 km/h; 29 mph)
- Range: 1,000 miles (1,600 km)
- Complement: Up to 12

USCGC Blacktip (WPB-87326) is an 87-foot (27 m) Marine Protector-class patrol boat of the United States Coast Guard. Commissioned in 2000, it was based for 25 years in Oxnard, California, where it patrolled the waters around the Channel Islands and off Southern California. In 2025 it moved about 2,800 miles (4,500 km) to a new homeport at Valdez, Alaska, replacing the decommissioned cutter Liberty in Prince William Sound. Its missions include maritime law enforcement and security, fisheries enforcement and search and rescue.

== Design ==
Blacktip is one of the Marine Protector-class coastal patrol boats built for the Coast Guard by Bollinger Shipyards of Lockport, Louisiana, under a contract first awarded on March 13, 1996. The class replaced the older 82-foot Point-class cutters. The boats are 19.5 feet (5.9 m) wide and displace 100 long tons. They have a top speed of 25 knots (46 km/h; 29 mph), a range of 1,000 miles (1,600 km) and room for a crew of up to 12.

== Service history ==
=== Oxnard ===
Blacktip was commissioned in 2000 and spent its first 25 years based in Oxnard. The cutter was berthed at Coast Guard Station Channel Islands in Channel Islands Harbor, where tours of the boat were part of the station's annual Safe Boating Open House.

On December 2, 2012, Senior Chief Petty Officer Terrell Horne of the patrol boat Halibut was killed when a suspected smuggling panga rammed his small boat near Santa Cruz Island. Channel Islands National Park closed the island to visitors for four days while law enforcement rangers searched it. Blacktip patrolled off the island that day, and its crew told a ferry captain that a search was under way for people believed to have been put ashore.

In December 2016 a 37-foot (11 m) sailboat with two people aboard radioed the Coast Guard at 10 p.m. to report that a broken boom had left it disabled about 23 miles (37 km) off Catalina Island. Blacktip was sent to help. Its crew lit the sailboat with a spotlight while the owner tried to repair the boom. When the sailboat's engine then overheated, Blacktip took it in tow ahead of incoming bad weather and towed it toward the Port of Los Angeles. A boat crew from Coast Guard Station Los Angeles-Long Beach brought it into the Port of Long Beach the next afternoon, and both people aboard were unhurt.

=== Valdez ===
In 2025 the Coast Guard decommissioned Liberty, a 110-foot (34 m) Island-class patrol boat based at Valdez. Liberty left Valdez on April 29, 2025, after a ceremony at the town's South Harbor. On May 2 the City of Valdez announced that Blacktip would take its place. U.S. Senators Dan Sullivan and Lisa Murkowski had pressed the Coast Guard to keep a cutter in Valdez. Sullivan noted that Valdez is the nation's northernmost ice-free port and supports energy and national security infrastructure.

Blacktip reached Valdez in July 2025 after a voyage of about 2,800 miles (4,500 km) from California. The Coast Guard said it would carry out missions throughout its Arctic District.

== See also ==
- List of United States Coast Guard cutters
