= Washington Naval Militia =

The Washington Naval Militia is the currently inactive naval militia of the state of Washington. The Washington Naval Militia was organized as a naval reserve, serving as the naval parallel to the Washington National Guard.

== History ==
The Washington Naval Militia was commissioned on 9 January 1910. By that year, it reached a strength of 286 officers and enlisted men. USS Concord was assigned as barracks ship for the Washington Naval Militia at Seattle until 15 June 1914 when it was reassigned to the Public Health Service.

In 1911, USS Wyoming was assigned to the Washington Naval Militia, until its reassignment in 1913. In 1912, USS Vicksburg was assigned to the Washington Naval Militia, where it remained until 1917.

USS New Orleans served as a training ship for the Washington Naval Militia over the summer of 1914. On the first through the twenty-second of July 1914, the Washington Naval Militia sailed to Honolulu aboard USS Milwaukee during a training exercise.

== Personnel ==
Naval militias are partially regulated and equipped by the federal government, and therefore membership requirements are partially set according to federal standards. Under 10 U.S. Code § 7854, in order to be eligible for access to "vessels, material, armament, equipment, and other facilities of the Navy and the Marine Corps available to the Navy Reserve and the Marine Corps Reserve", at least 95% of members of the naval militia must also be members of the United States Navy Reserve or the United States Marine Corps Reserve.

== Legal status ==
Naval militias of individual U.S. states are recognized by the federal government of the United States under 10 U.S. Code §7851. As Washington State law currently does not provide for, nor mention a naval militia, it would take action by state lawmakers to pass laws allowing for a state naval militia.

== See also ==
- Washington State Guard
