= John E. Pillsbury =

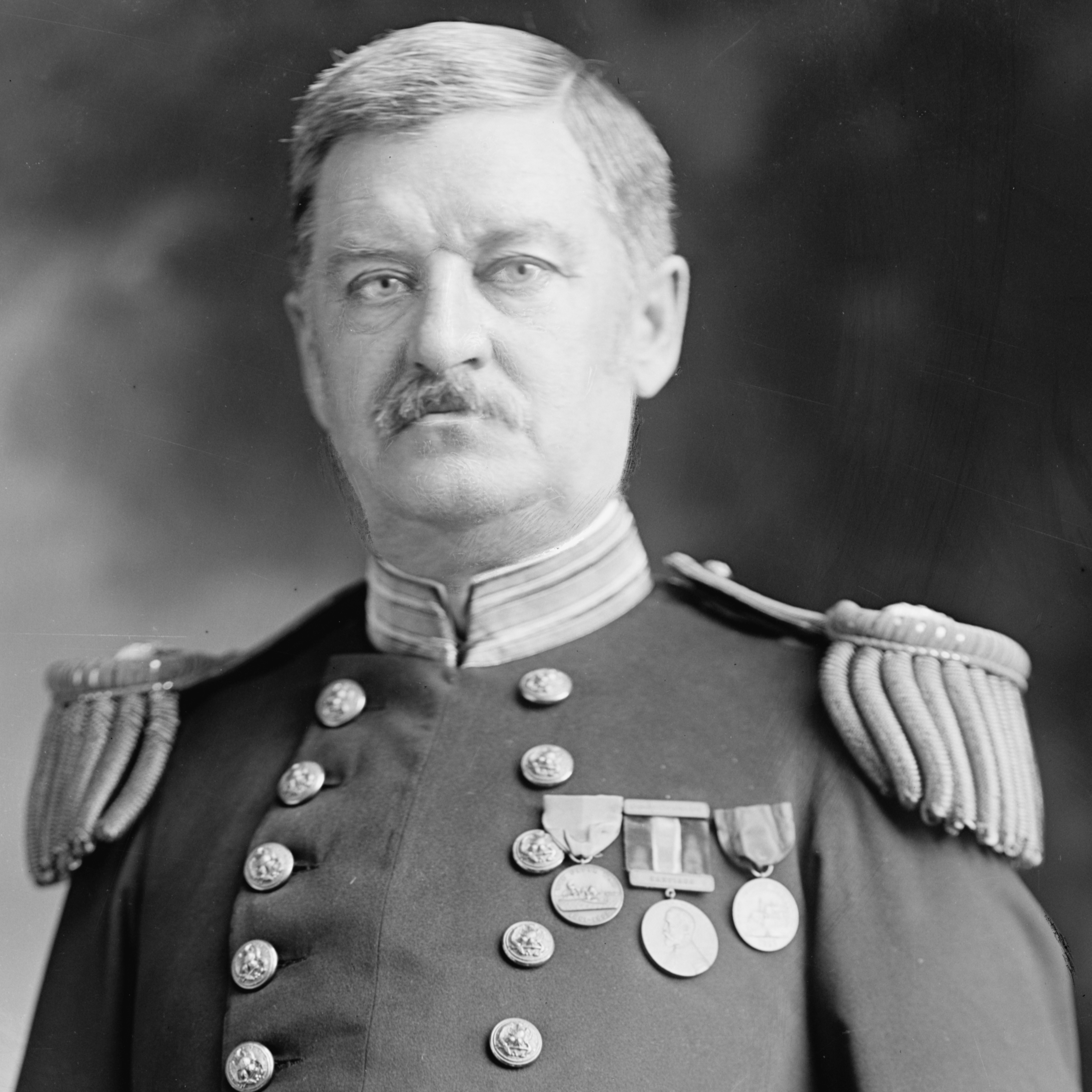
- Born: 15 December 1846; Lowell, Massachusetts, U.S.
- Died: 30 December 1919 (aged 73)
- Burial place: Arlington National Cemetery
- Military career
- Allegiance: United States of America
- Branch: United States Navy
- Service years: 1862–1909
- Rank: Rear admiral
- Commands: Vesuvius
- Conflicts: American Civil War; Spanish–American War

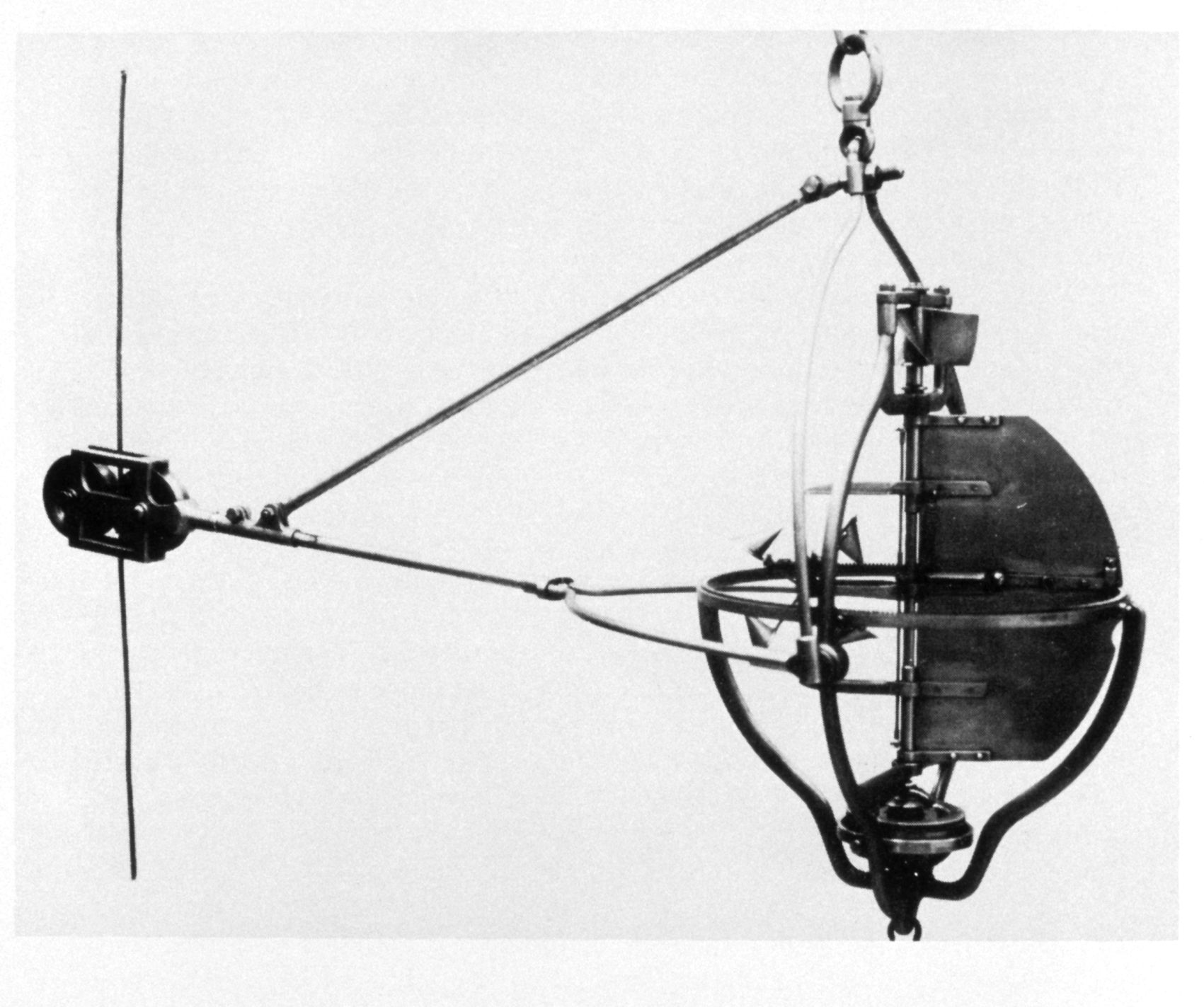
Pillsbury Current Meter, devised in 1876 by Pillsbury and used in a study of the Gulf Stream. In 1885 this instrument was used in the Straits of Florida at a depth of 640 meters

John Elliott Pillsbury (15 December 1846 – 30 December 1919) was a Rear Admiral in the United States Navy.

== Biography ==
Born in Lowell, Massachusetts, Pillsbury was appointed midshipman in 1862 and commissioned an ensign in 1868. After serving on various stations afloat and ashore, he commanded the coast steamer Blake from 1884 to 1891 and did excellent scientific work, using some of his research instruments of his own invention. In the Spanish–American War, he commanded the dynamite cruiser Vesuvius, operating around the island of Cuba and in the vicinity of Morro Castle. In 1905 he served as Chief of Staff of the North Atlantic Fleet and in 1908–09, was Chief of the Bureau of Navigation. In 1908 he was the first recipient of the West Indies Campaign Medal.

Although Rear Admiral Pillsbury's attainments as a sailor and a fighting man were noteworthy, he is perhaps best known as having been one of the world's foremost geographers and an authority on the Gulf Stream. Actively identified with the National Geographic Society for many years, he was president of the society at the time of his death. He was buried in Arlington National Cemetery; his wife Florence was buried with him after her death in 1925.

Admiral Pillsbury was a Veteran Companion of the District of Columbia Commandery of the Military Order of the Loyal Legion of the United States. He was assigned insignia number 16053.

== Namesakes ==
Two U.S. Navy ships have been christened USS Pillsbury in his honor. Pillsbury Sound, the body of water in the U.S. Virgin Islands between St Thomas, St John, and the cays which bound the sound on the North side, is also named in his honor.

== Awards ==
- Sampson Medal
- Civil War Campaign Medal
- West Indies Campaign Medal

== Gallery ==
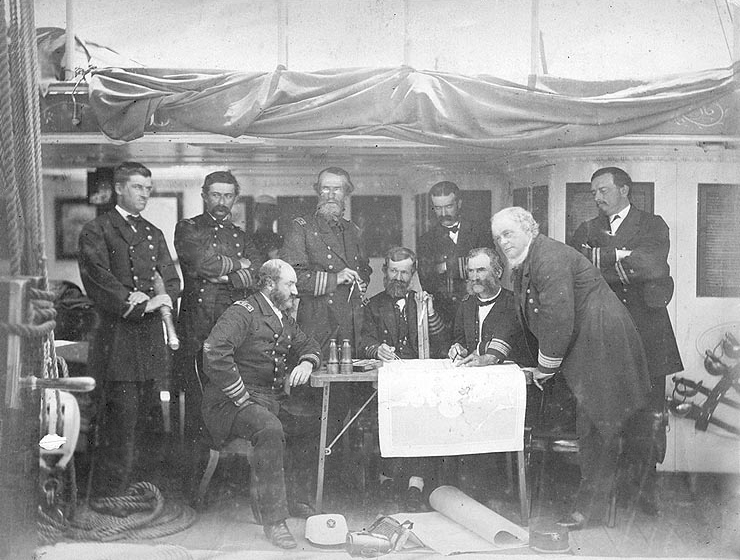
A posed photograph of U.S. Navy officers holding a council of war aboard the Asiatic Squadron flagship, the steam frigate USS Colorado, off Korea in June 1871 prior to the Korean Expedition. Pillsbury, photographed as a master, stands on the left.
