= General Walker =

General Walker may refer to:

== United Kingdom ==
- Antony Walker (born 1934), British Army general
- Charles Pyndar Beauchamp Walker (1817–1894), British Army general
- Sir George Walker, 1st Baronet (1764–1842), British Army general
- Harold Walker (British Army officer) (1862–1934), British Army lieutenant general
- Henry Alexander Walker (1874–1953), British Army honorary brigadier general
- Mark Walker (British Army officer) (1827–1902), British Army general
- Michael Walker, Baron Walker of Aldringham (born 1944), British Army general
- Roland Walker (born 1970), British Army lieutenant-general
- Walter Walker (British Army officer) (1912–2001), British Army general
- William George Walker (1863–1936), British Army major general

== United States ==
- Edwin Walker (1909–1993), U.S. Army general, only general to resign in the 20th century
- Emmett H. Walker Jr. (1924–2007), U.S. Army lieutenant general
- Flem Walker (fl. 1980s–2020s), U.S. Army lieutenant general
- Francis Amasa Walker (1840–1897), honorary brigadier general following service in the Union Army
- Fred L. Walker (1887–1969), U.S. Army major general
- George J. Walker (1934–2005), U.S. Army brigadier general
- Glenn D. Walker (1916–2002), U.S. Army lieutenant general
- John T. Walker (USMC) (1893–1955), U.S. Marine Corps lieutenant general
- Kenneth Walker (1898–1943), U.S. Army Air Forces brigadier general
- Meriwether Lewis Walker (1869–1947), U.S. Army brigadier general
- Sam S. Walker (1925–2015), U.S. Army general
- Walton Walker (1889–1950), general commanding the U.S. Army in Korea at the start of the Korean War
- William J. Walker (fl. 1970s–2020s), U.S. Army major general

Confederate States Army

- Francis Marion Walker (1827–1864), brigadier general
- Henry Harrison Walker (1832–1912), brigadier general
- James A. Walker (1832–1901), brigadier general
- John George Walker (1821–1893), major general
- LeRoy Pope Walker (1817–1884), brigadier general
- Lucius M. Walker (1829–1863), brigadier general
- Reuben Lindsay Walker (1827–1890), brigadier general
- William H. T. Walker (1816–1864), major general
- William Stephen Walker (1822–1899), brigadier general

== See also ==
- Attorney General Walker (disambiguation)
- Admiral Walker (disambiguation)
