= Attorney General Walker =

Attorney General Walker may refer to:

- Clifford Walker (1877–1954), Attorney General of Georgia
- Henry N. Walker (1811–1886), Attorney General of Michigan
- Robert Walker (Canadian politician) (1916–1989), Attorney General of Saskatchewan
- Sir Samuel Walker, 1st Baronet (1832–1911), Attorney-General for Ireland
- Thomas Walker (Australian politician) (1858–1932), Attorney General of Western Australia

== See also ==
- General Walker (disambiguation)
