= USS Pillsbury =

Two ships in the United States Navy have been named USS Pillsbury for John E. Pillsbury.

- The first USS Pillsbury (DD-227) was a Clemson-class destroyer, commissioned in 1920 and sunk in enemy action in March 1942.
- The second USS Pillsbury (DE-133) was an Edsall-class destroyer escort, commissioned in 1943 and decommissioned in 1960.
