= West Indies Campaign Medal =

United States military medal

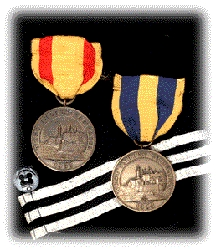
- Obverse
- Type: Campaign medal
- Awarded for: Service in the West Indies campaign of the Spanish–American War
- Presented by: Department of the Navy
- Eligibility: Members of the US Navy and Marine Corps
- Established: 27 June 1908
- First award: 1 May 1898
- Final award: 16 August 1898
- First ribbon of the medal

The West Indies Campaign Medal was a United States military medal of the Navy and Marine Corps issued for service in the West Indies campaign theater of the Spanish–American War. The medal was established on 27 June 1908 and the first recipient of the award was Rear Admiral John E. Pillsbury.

== Design ==
The medal was designed by Bailey Banks & Biddle and resembled the Navy version of the Spanish Campaign Medal both featuring the Morro fortress at the entrance to the Havana harbor.

== Award criteria ==
To be awarded the West Indies Campaign Medal, a service member must have performed sea duty in the West Indies between 1 May 1898 and 16 August 1898. The award was a one time decoration only and there were no devices authorized for multiple engagements or combat participation. The decoration was rarely bestowed, since most Navy and Marine Corps personnel received the Sampson Medal for West Indies service, and Navy regulations prohibited the bestowal of both the Sampson Medal and West Indies Campaign Medal for the same period of duty.

== Obsolescence ==
The West Indies Campaign Medal was declared obsolete by the U.S. Navy in 1913, following a diplomatic request by Spain that the United States discontinue service medals which displayed Spain's national colors. As a result, those who had previously received the West Indies Campaign Medal were permitted to exchange the decoration for the Spanish Campaign Medal.
