= USS Concord (PG-3) =

Yorktown-class gunboat

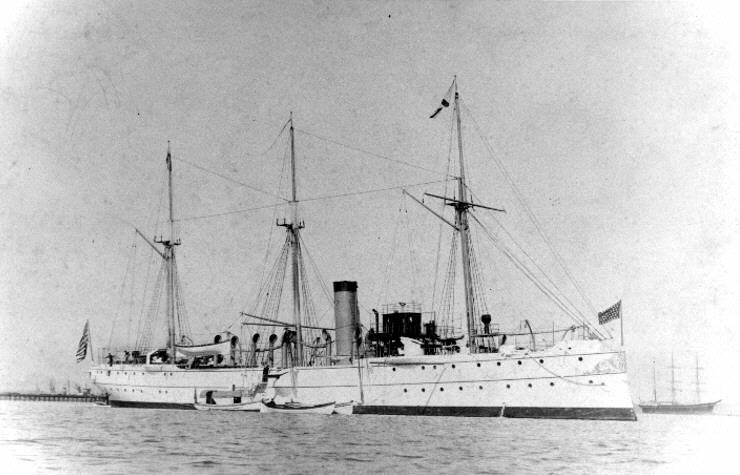
- USS Concord

History

United States
- Name: USS Concord (PG-3)
- Namesake: Concord, Massachusetts, site of the Battle of Concord
- Awarded: 1888 fiscal year
- Builder: N. F. Palmer & Co.; Hull: Delaware River Shipbuilding
- Yard number: 249
- Laid down: May 1888
- Launched: 8 March 1890
- Sponsored by: Miss M. D. Coates
- Commissioned: 14 February 1891
- Decommissioned: 27 May 1896
- Recommissioned: 22 May 1897
- Decommissioned: 26 February 1902
- Recommissioned: 15 June 1903
- Decommissioned: 25 August 1904
- Recommissioned: 16 September 1905
- Decommissioned: 4 November 1909
- In service: as barracks ship for Washington Naval Militia, 1910
- Out of service: 1914
- In service: as quarantine ship for the Public Health Service, 1915
- Out of service: 1929
- Fate: Sold 28 June 1929

General characteristics
- Class & type: Yorktown-class gunboat
- Displacement: 1,710 long tons (1,740 t)
- Length: 244 ft 5 in (74.50 m)
- Beam: 36 ft (11 m)
- Draft: 14 ft (4.3 m)
- Propulsion: 2 × horizontally mounted triple-expansion steam engines, 3,400 ihp (2,500 kW); 2 × screw propellers; 4 × railroad boilers
- Sail plan: three-masted schooner rig with a total sail area of 6,300 sq ft (590 m^{2})
- Speed: 16.8 knots (31.1 km/h)
- Complement: 193
- Armament: 6 × 6-inch (152 mm)/30 caliber Mark 3 guns; 2 × 6-pounder (57 mm (2.24 in)) guns; 2 × 3-pounder (47 mm (1.85 in)) guns; 2 × 1-pounder (37 mm (1.46 in)) guns
- Armor: deck: 0.375 inches (9.5 mm); conning tower: 2 inches (51 mm)

USS Concord (Gunboat No. 3/PG-3) was a member of the Yorktown class of steel-hulled, twin-screw gunboats in the United States Navy in the late 19th and early 20th centuries. She was the second U.S. Navy ship named in honor of the town of Concord, Massachusetts, site of the Battle of Concord in the American Revolutionary War.

The contract to build Concord was awarded to N. F. Palmer & Co. of Philadelphia in the 1888 fiscal year. Her hull was subcontracted to the Delaware River Iron Shipbuilding & Engine Works which laid down her keel in May 1888. Concord was launched in March 1890. She was just over 244 feet (74 m) long and 36 feet (11 m) abeam and displaced 1,710 long tons (1,740 t). She was equipped with two steam engines which were supplemented with three schooner-rigged masts. The ship had a main battery of six 6-inch (15.2 cm) guns, and several smaller caliber guns.

After her 1891 commissioning, Concord spent the next few years sailing along the East Coast, in the West Indies, and in the Gulf of Mexico. Concord cruised on the Asiatic Station—interrupted only by a short stint on the Alaskan sealing patrol—from 1893 until May 1896, when she began a year out of commission at San Francisco. In January 1898, Concord returned to the Asiatic Station, and joined Admiral George Dewey's fleet for 1 May 1898 Battle of Manila Bay, a decisive American victory over the Spanish Fleet in the Spanish–American War. After the battle, Concord supported United States Army operations in the Philippines in the Philippine–American War. For the rest of her active career, Concord patrolled off the Mexican and Alaskan coasts and served on the Yangtze Patrol. She was decommissioned in 1909 and served as a barracks ship until 1914, and as a quarantine ship at the Columbia River Quarantine Station near Astoria, Oregon for the Public Health Service until 1929, at which time she was returned to the Navy and sold.

== Design and construction ==
The Yorktown class gunboats—unofficially considered third-class cruisers—were the product of a United States Navy design attempt to produce compact, good sea-keeping ships able to carry a heavy battery. Concord was authorized in the 1888 fiscal year, and the contract for her construction was awarded to N. F. Palmer & Co. of Chester, Pennsylvania. The hull for Concord was sublet by Palmer to the Delaware River Iron Shipbuilding & Engine Works and built to the Navy's Bureau of Construction and Repair design. The mechanical design was patterned after the layout for older sister ship Yorktown developed by William Cramp & Sons .

Concord's keel was laid down in May 1888, and the ship was launched on 8 March 1890, sponsored by Minnie Darlington Coates, the daughter of Major Joseph R. T. Coates, the mayor of Chester. Among those in attendance at the launch ceremony was sculptor Daniel Chester French.

=== Layout ===
As built, Concord was 244 feet 5 inches (74.50 m) in length and 36 feet (11 m) abeam. Her steel hull had an average draft of 14 feet (4 m), which was expected to be small enough to give her the ability to escape from larger ships into shallow water. At the waterline was a turtleback deck of 3/8-inch (9.5 mm) steel that formed a watertight seal over the lower spaces. The deck had a crown at the level of the waterline and curved downwards to 3 feet (0.91 m) below the waterline at the sides of the ship. Below this armored deck were twelve compartments separated by watertight bulkheads; the spaces above were equipped with watertight doors intended to be closed during battle.

Above the armored deck, Concord had forecastle and poop decks, and an open gun deck that spanned the length of the ship between them. The conning tower was located forward on the forecastle deck, and was oval-shaped to deflect shot. It was outfitted with a steam-powered steering wheel, a telegraph, and speaking tubes; it was protected by 2 inches (51 mm) of steel armor plate.

=== Propulsion ===
Concord was powered by two triple-expansion steam engines which each drove one of the pair of 10.5-foot (3.2 m), three-bladed screw propellers. The cylinders of each engine were 22, 31, and 51 inches (56, 79, and 130 cm) in diameter and had a 30-inch (76 cm) stroke. Each engine was rated at 3,400 indicated horsepower (2,500 kW), and both together were designed to move the ship at 16 knots (30 km/h), though the ship exceeded that in her trials.

The engines, situated in separate watertight compartments, were each fed by a pair of horizontally mounted coal-fired boilers 9 feet 6 inches (2.90 m) in diameter and 17 feet 6 inches (5.33 m) in length, with a total grate area of 220 square inches (1,400 cm^{2}). Concord's bunkers could carry up to 400 long tons (410 t) of coal, and were shielded from "shot and shell". At a near top-speed of 16 knots, the ship could sail 2,800 nautical miles (5,200 km) in 6 1/2 days; at the more economical speed of 8 knots (15 km/h) she could cruise 12,000 nautical miles (22,000 km) over 62 days.

To supplement her steam power plant, Concord was built with three schooner-rigged masts, providing a total sail area of 6,300 square feet (590 m^{2}). The steam and sail combination was expected to allow Concord to remain at sea for months at a time during wartime.

=== Armament ===
Concord's main battery consisted of six 6-inch (152 mm)/30 caliber Mark 3 guns, (Note: The 30 denotes the length of the gun barrels; in this case, the gun is 30 calibers, meaning that the gun is 30 times long as it is in diameter.) each weighing over 11,000 pounds (5,000 kg). Two were mounted on the forecastle deck, two on the poop deck, and the other pair amidships on the gun deck. The two guns on the gun deck were mounted 10 feet (3.0 m) above the waterline, while the other four were 18 feet (5.5 m) above. The guns fired 105-pound (48 kg) armor-piercing projectiles with a propellant charge weighing 18.8 pounds (8.5 kg) at 1,950 feet per second (590 m/s). At an elevation of 30.2°, the guns had a range of 18,000 yards (16,000 m). Each gun was shielded with steel plating 3 inches (76 mm) thick.

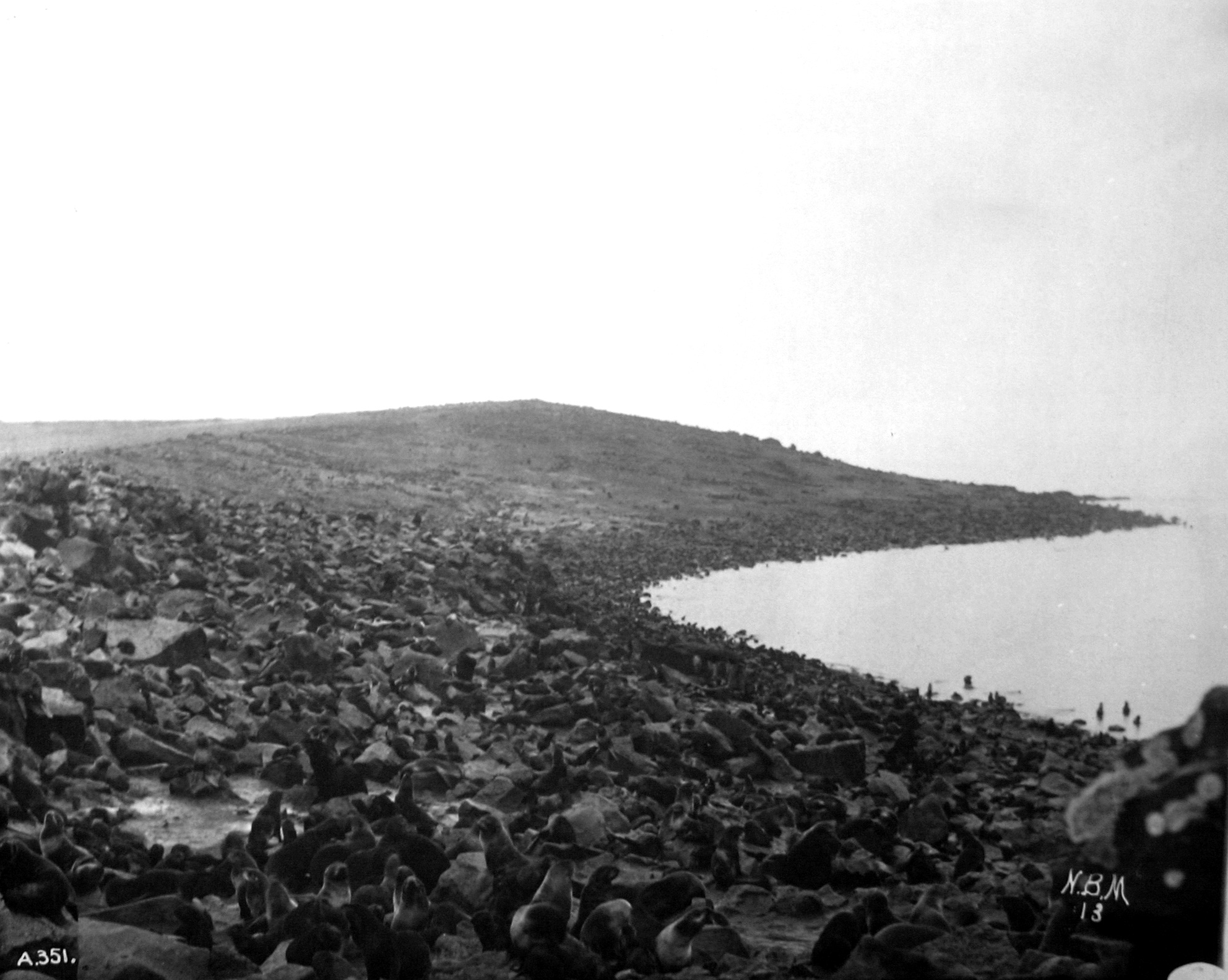
Concord took part in the sealing patrol that hoped to curb poaching of fur seals, like these photographed at the Garbotch rookery, Saint Paul Island, Alaska, in August 1891.

Concord's secondary battery consisted of two 6-pounder (57 mm (2.24 in)) guns, two 3-pounder (47 mm (1.85 in)) guns, and two 1-pounder (37 mm (1.46 in)) guns. All were based on designs of the French arms company Hotchkiss. According to a 1902 Bureau of Ordnance publication, an armor-piercing round fired from a 6-pounder gun could penetrate 2 inches (51 mm) of armor at a distance of 1,000 yards (910 m).

== Career ==
USS Concord (PG-3) was commissioned on 14 February 1891 under the command of Commander O. A. Batcheller. Concord operated on the coast of New England, and sailed from New York City on 17 November 1891 on a cruise to the West Indies and South America with her squadron, then arrived at New Orleans, Louisiana, on 27 April 1892 and cruised up the Mississippi River as far as Cairo, Illinois, visiting various ports en route.

Returning to New York on 13 June 1892, Concord made another cruise to Venezuela and the West Indies late that year, and arrived back at Norfolk, Virginia, on 5 December. She participated in International Naval Review held at Norfolk and New York in March and April 1893, and in June sailed from Norfolk for the Far East, calling at the Azores, Gibraltar, Malta, Port Said, Bangkok, and Saigon before arriving at Hong Kong on 30 October. She cruised on the Asiatic Station until 29 May 1894 when she arrived at Unalaska. She cruised on sealing patrol in the North Pacific to carry out the provisions of the treaty between the United States and United Kingdom, which empowered Concord to seize any vessel violating the laws protecting valuable fur seals. She gathered hydrographic information to correct Bering Sea charts and conduct scientific observations of the fur seals.

Concord returned to the Asiatic Station in September 1894 and continued to serve in the Far East until returning to San Francisco on 3 May 1896. She was placed out of commission for repairs between 27 May 1896 and 22 May 1897. After a cruise to Alaskan waters 1 July – 29 November, she sailed from Mare Island 8 January 1898 for the Asiatic Station under the command of Commander (later Rear Admiral) Asa Walker. With the declaration of war between Spain and the United States in April, Concord joined Admiral George Dewey's squadron at Mirs Bay near Hong Kong on the 24th and sailed for the Philippines. On 1 May, Concord participated in the Battle of Manila Bay that resulted in American control of the Philippines.

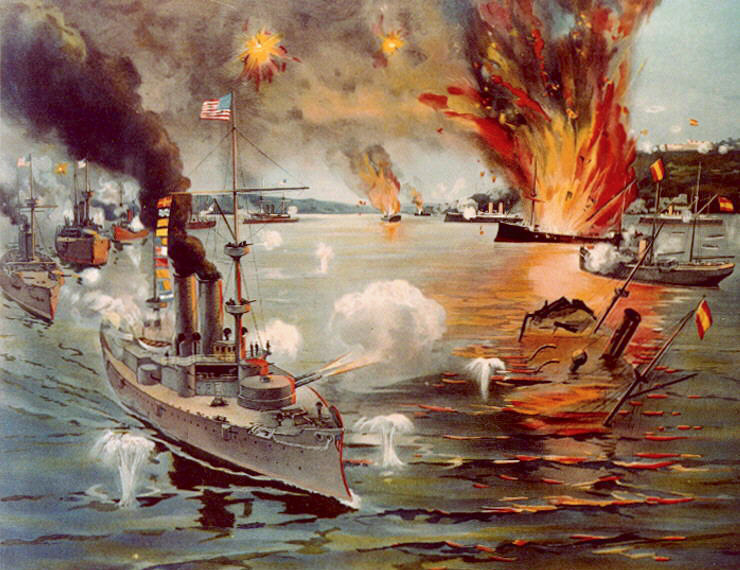
Concord participated in the Battle of Manila Bay, depicted here in a contemporary color print.

Concord resumed her patrol on station in August 1898, but returned to the Philippines on 19 December to assist in putting down the insurrection. Her duty consisted of patrolling the coast to restrict insurgent movements and shipping; bombarding various strongholds; and aiding United States Army operations. Except for a voyage to Guam in March 1900 to deliver stores, and a brief voyage to Hong Kong for repairs, Concord remained in Philippine waters until June 1901, when she sailed by way of Alaskan waters to San Francisco, arriving 28 September 1901. She cruised with the Fleet in Mexican waters, then went out of commission on 26 February 1902 at Mare Island.

Recommissioned on 15 June 1903 Concord operated along the North American coast from Alaska to Panama and to Hawaii and Alaska until decommissioned at Bremerton, Washington, on 25 August 1904. Concord was commissioned again on 16 September 1905 and sailed from Bremerton on 24 December 1905 for operations in the Philippines. Remaining there until March 1906, Concord sailed to China. Until 1908 she remained in the Far East serving at times on the Yangtze Patrol and as station ship at Shanghai and Canton.

Concord served as station ship at Guam from 2 January to 10 September 1909, then sailed to Puget Sound Navy Yard where she arrived on 11 October. She was decommissioned for the final time on 4 November 1909, and assigned as barracks ship for the Washington Naval Militia at Seattle. She was transferred to the Public Health Service of the Treasury Department on 15 June 1914 and served as a stationary quarantine barge at Astoria, Oregon. Returned to naval custody on 19 March 1929, she was sold on 28 June 1929.

== Legacy ==
In August 1915 two of the Concord's six-inch guns were placed in the War Garden of Woodland Park, Seattle, WA. The Seattle Times of 15 August stated: "Two six-inch guns from the United States cruiser Concord which saw active service at the battle of Manila, yesterday afternoon were brought to Seattle from Bremerton under the direction of the United Spanish War Veterans, to be mounted in Woodland Park in the near future. W. S. F. Quick, chairman of the board of managers of the United Spanish War Veterans Club of Seattle, yesterday signed a receipt for government property valued at $18,000, which gives the local veterans practical possession of the pieces from now on. The two guns when mounted will be known as Battery Dewey." These guns today are in the Veterans Memorial Museum in Chehalis, Washington.

== Awards ==
- Dewey Medal
- Navy Expeditionary Medal
- Spanish Campaign Medal
- Philippine Campaign Medal

== Bibliography ==
- Bauer, K. Jack; Roberts, Stephen S. (1991). Register of Ships of the U.S. Navy, 1775–1990: Major Combatants. New York: Greenwood Press. ISBN 978-0-313-26202-9. OCLC 24010356.
- Benham, Edith Wallace (1913). Ships of the United States Navy and Their Sponsors, 1797–1913. Norwood, Massachusetts: Privately Printed. OCLC 7397146.
- Naval History & Heritage Command. "Concord". Dictionary of American Naval Fighting Ships. Navy Department, Naval History and Heritage Command.
- Grobmeier, Alvin H. (1990). "Question 2/89". Warship International. XXVII (2): 198–199. ISSN 0043-0374.
- Silverstone, Paul H. (2006). The New Navy, 1883-1922. New York: Routledge. ISBN 978-0-415-97871-2. OCLC 63171106.
