= Terrell Horne =

American Coast Guard officer (1978–2012)

Terrell Horne III
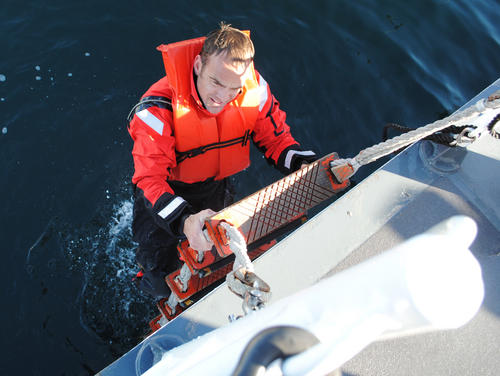
- Born: October 26, 1978; Mountain View, California, United States
- Died: December 2, 2012
- Military career
- Allegiance: United States
- Branch: United States Coast Guard
- Service years: 1999 - 2012
- Rank: Senior Chief Petty Officer
- Known for: Died in the line of duty protecting a comrade

Terrell Edwin Horne III (October 26, 1978 – December 2, 2012) was a senior chief petty officer with the United States Coast Guard, who was killed in the line of duty while intercepting smugglers, on December 2, 2012.

Horne had fourteen years service in the Coast Guard and was second in command of the Marine Protector class cutter USCGC Halibut on the night he was killed in action. He was aboard the Halibut's pursuit boat when it was sent to intercept the smugglers. When they were ordered to heave to, the smugglers rammed Horne's boat and his head was fatally struck by their propeller. Horne is credited with pushing the coxswain out of the path of danger at the cost of his own life.

On July 30, 2014, the Coast Guard Commandant, Paul Zukunft, announced that the Coast Guard would name a Sentinel class cutter after Horne. All of the cutters will be named after enlisted members of the Coast Guard, or one of its precursors, who were recognized as heroes.

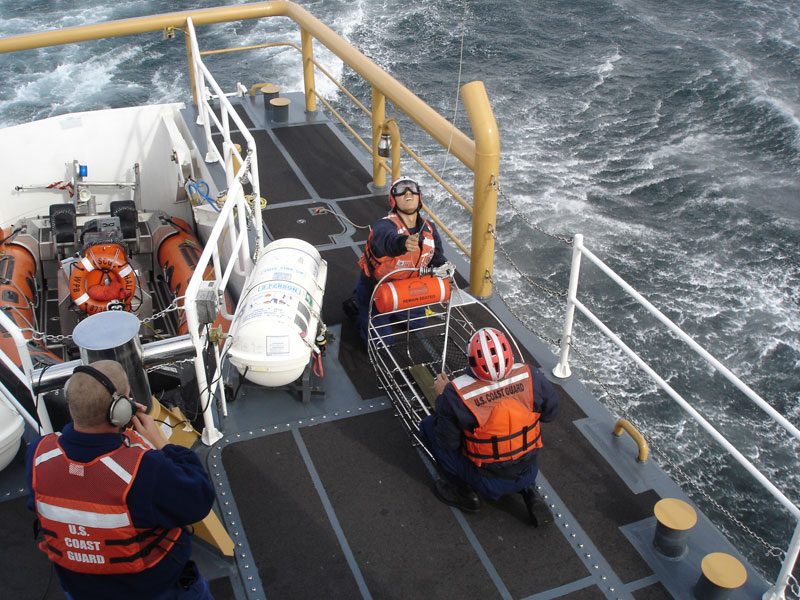
On the night of his death Horne was aboard the Halibut's high-speed water-jet powered pursuit boat, seen here to the left, in its stern-launching ramp.

== Awards and decorations ==
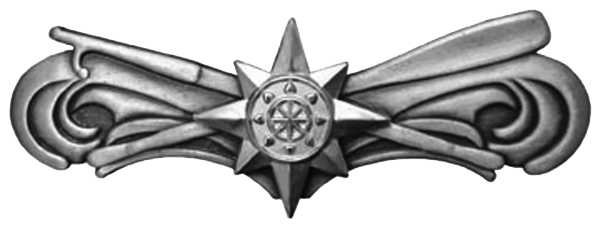

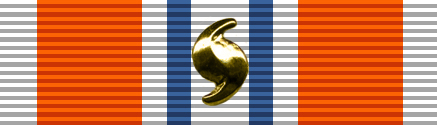

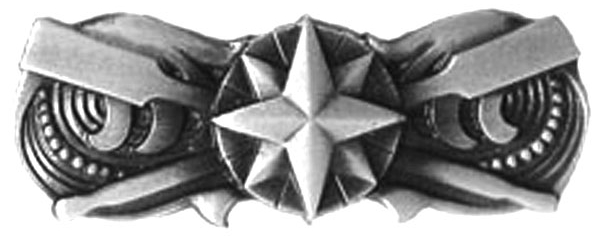
