= Dewey Medal =

Military decoration of the United States Navy

Battle of Manila Bay or "Dewey" Medal
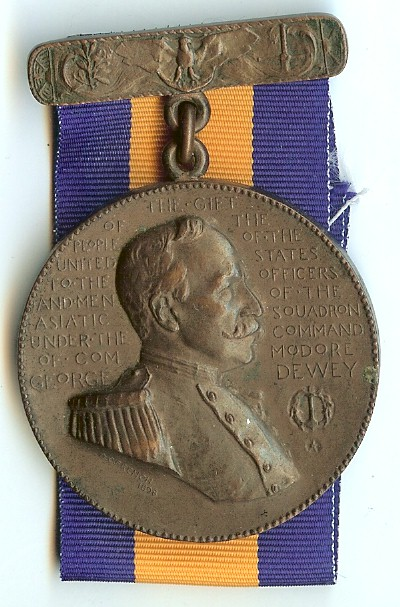
- Obverse
- Type: Military medal Service medal
- Awarded for: Participation in the Battle of Manila Bay on May 1, 1898
- Presented by: Department of the Navy
- Eligibility: Officers and men of the ships of the Asiatic Squadron of the United States under the command of Commodore George Dewey
- Status: Obsolete
- Established: June 3, 1898
- First award: 1898
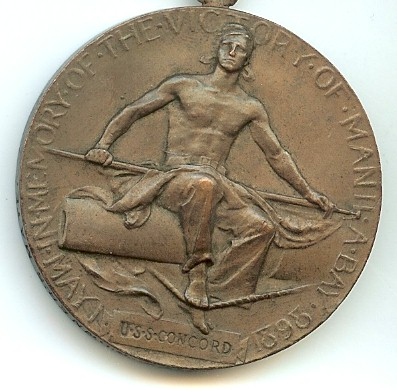
- Reverse and ribbon of the medal

Order of Wear (1972)
- Next (higher): Organized Marine Corps Reserve Medal
- Next (lower): Sampson Medal

The Dewey Medal, also known as the Battle of Manila Bay Medal, was a military decoration of the United States Navy which was established by the United States Congress on June 3, 1898. The medal recognizes the leadership of Admiral of the Navy George Dewey, during the Spanish–American War, and the Sailors and Marines under his command.

== Criteria ==
The Dewey Medal was created to recognize the forces of the U.S. Navy and United States Marine Corps who participated in the Battle of Manila Bay. To be awarded the Dewey Medal, a service member must have served on one of the following naval vessels on May 1, 1898. There were 1,848 men of the Navy and Marine Corps eligible for the Medal:

- USS Baltimore
- USS Boston
- USS Concord
- USRC McCulloch
- USS Olympia
- USS Petrel
- USS Raleigh

The colliers USS Nanshan and USS Zafiro were part of Dewey's squadron and supported the Manila Bay operation but are not listed in Navy regulations having their crew members eligible for the Dewey Medal. This is probably because 1. the ships were not actively engaged in the battle and 2. they were, at that time, civilian crewed ships purchased to support the Navy. Nanshan was commanded by Lieutenant Benjamin W. Hodges, USN but technically remained a merchant ship so she could resupply at neutral ports which simplified the squadron's logistics. Zafiro was commanded by Ensign Henry A. Pearson, USN and, like Nanshan, was technically a merchant ship at the time of the battle. Both ships were later commissioned in the Navy.

The Dewey Medal was a one-time only decoration and there were no devices or campaign stars authorized to the medal. Admiral Dewey was awarded the medal, although, out of modesty, he always wore it with the medal's reverse displayed. which depicted a sailor sitting on a gun. Dewey had the rare distinction of being one of only four Americans entitled to wear a medal with their own image on it. The others were Rear Admiral William T. Sampson (Sampson Medal), Rear Admiral Richard E. Byrd (1st and 2nd Byrd Antarctic Expedition Medals) and General of the Armies John J. Pershing (Army of Occupation of Germany Medal).

The medal was recognized as being given for active military duty; yet because it recognized a single battle in a single campaign, the Dewey Medal was a commemorative medal. When worn on a military uniform the Dewey Medal was considered senior to the Sampson Medal, although there were no individuals who received both medals.

The Dewey Medal is one of a very few United States military awards to have fewer recipients than the Medal of Honor, which numbers just over 3,500 as of 2021. Only 1,825 medals were struck in the original Navy order to Tiffany and Company.

== Appearance ==
This medal was designed by celebrated artist Daniel Chester French, who sculpted the statue of a seated Lincoln in Washington's Lincoln Memorial and the Minuteman statue at Concord, Massachusetts. The medal was struck by Tiffany & Co. The medal consists of a circular medallion, suspended from a blue and yellow ribbon. The front, or obverse, depicts a bust of Commodore George Dewey. On the back, or reverse, is included the name of the vessel on which the recipient served. The name of the recipient and rate (enlisted) or rank (officer) is engraved on the medal's lower rim, this being one of only two service medals issued officially named to the recipient.

== Literature ==
The Call of Duty : Military Awards and Decorations of the United States of America; by John E. Strandberg and Roger James Bender; R James Bender Pub; 1st of June 1994 ISBN 0912138548
