= Spanish Campaign Medal =

United States military medal

Army Spanish Campaign Medal
- Obverse
- Type: Campaign medal
- Presented by: Department of War
- Eligibility: Service in the Spanish–American War
- Status: Obsolete
- First award: 11 May 1898
- Final award: 16 August 1898
- ribbon and streamer

The Spanish Campaign Medal was a military award of the United States Armed Forces which recognized those men of the U.S. military who had served in the Spanish–American War. Although a single decoration, there were two versions of the Spanish Campaign Medal, one for men of the United States Army and another for the forces of the United States Navy and United States Marine Corps.

The Army medal was designed by Francis Davis Millet while the Navy and Marines medals were designed by Rudolf Freund (1878–1960) of Bailey Banks & Biddle.

Early versions of the Spanish Campaign Medal suspended the medal from a gold and red ribbon, but this design was changed in 1913 upon request from Spain that a United States service medal not bear the colors of the Spanish nation. The new medal was suspended from a blue and yellow ribbon. Separate medallions existed for both the Navy and Army. Marine Corps recipients received the Navy version with the seal of the United States Marine Corps on the reverse of the medal.

The only device authorized to the Spanish Campaign Medal was the Citation Star and then only for U.S. Army recipients of the decoration.

== Army version ==
The Army version of the Spanish Campaign Medal was established on 12 January 1905. It was awarded for military service performed between 11 May and 16 August 1898 in the geographical regions of either Cuba, Puerto Rico, or the Philippine Islands. As of 1 July 1923, a total of 7,667 medals were awarded.

For those men of the Army who had served on active duty during the Spanish–American War, but had not been deployed in action, a separate medal was established in 1918, known as the Spanish War Service Medal.

== Navy version ==
Navy and Marine Corps Spanish Campaign Medal
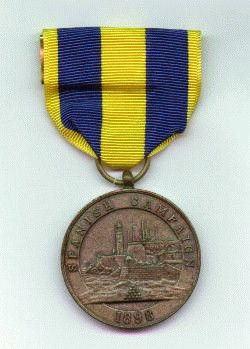
- Obverse
- Type: Campaign Medal
- Presented by: Department of the Navy
- Eligibility: Service in the Spanish–American War
- Status: Obsolete
- First award: 21 April 1898
- Final award: 16 August 1898
- ribbon and streamer

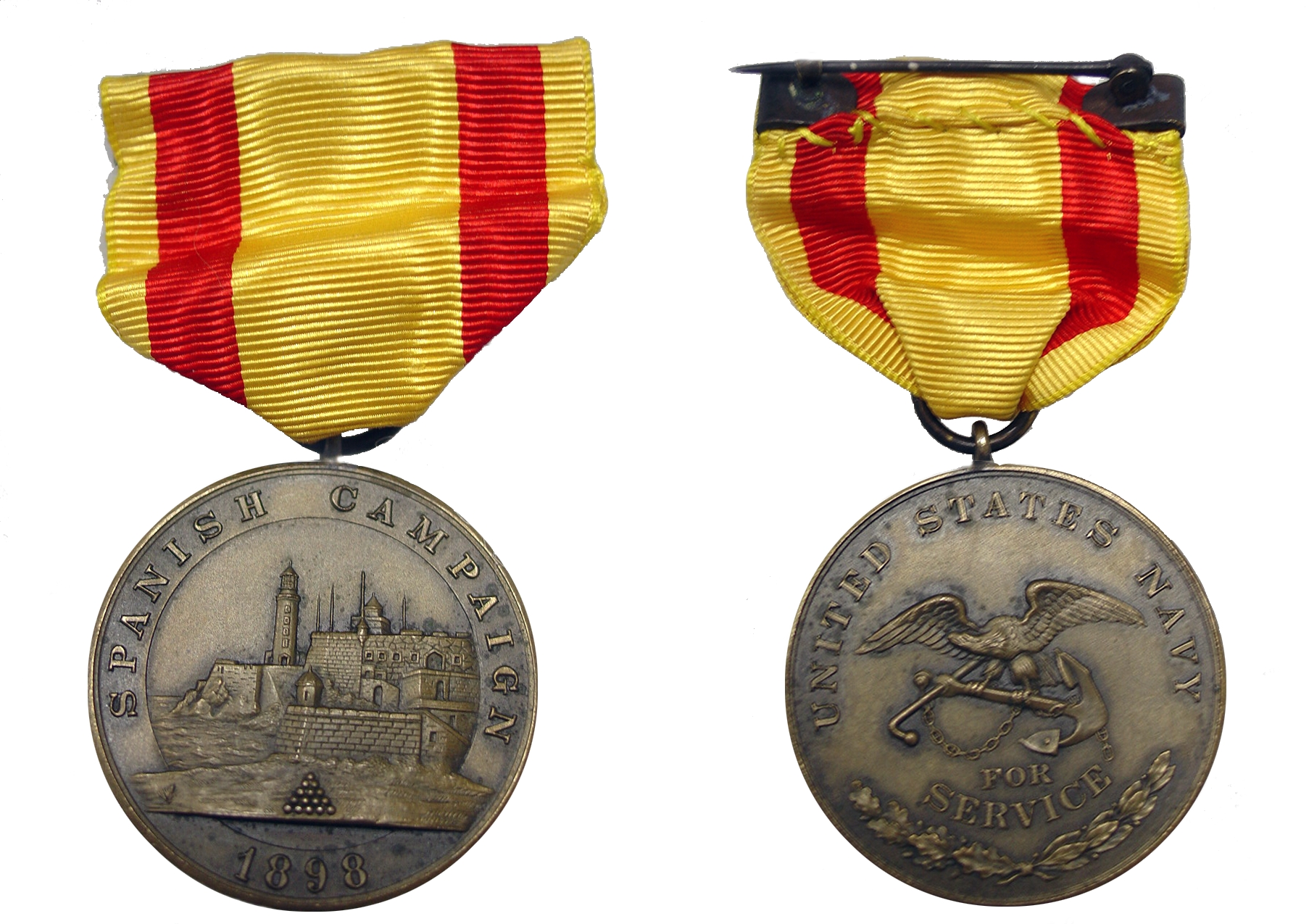
The Spanish Campaign Medal (Navy) with original ribbon

The Navy version of the Spanish Campaign Medal was created on 27 June 1908 and issued to any man of either the Navy or Marine Corps who had served in Cuban, Puerto Rican, or Philippine waters between 21 April and 16 August 1898 on select ships. Altogether, crews of 47 ships were eligible for the medal.

For service in the West Indies, the Navy awarded the West Indies Campaign Medal as well as the Sampson Medal which was authorized by a joint resolution of Congress in 1901. In 1913, the Navy discontinued the award of the West Indies Campaign Medal and extended the criteria of the Spanish Campaign Medal to any man of the Navy or Marine Corps who had served on active duty during the Spanish–American War. The ribbon was also changed from red and yellow to blue and yellow in order not to offend the colors of Spain.

== See also ==
- List of military decorations
