= Sampson Medal =

Medal Commemorating Naval Engagements in the West Indies

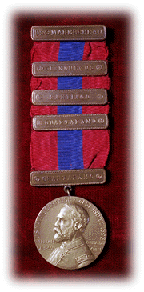
- Obverse
- Type: Military medal Campaign medal
- Awarded for: Combat operations in the waters of the West Indies and Cuba.
- Presented by: Department of the Navy
- Eligibility: Personnel who were assigned in the fleet of Rear Admiral William T. Sampson during the Spanish–American War
- Status: Obsolete
- Established: 1901
- First award: 1901; Retroactive to 1898
- Sampson Medal ribbon

Order of Wear (1972)
- Next (higher): Dewey Medal
- Next (lower): Peary Polar Expedition Medal

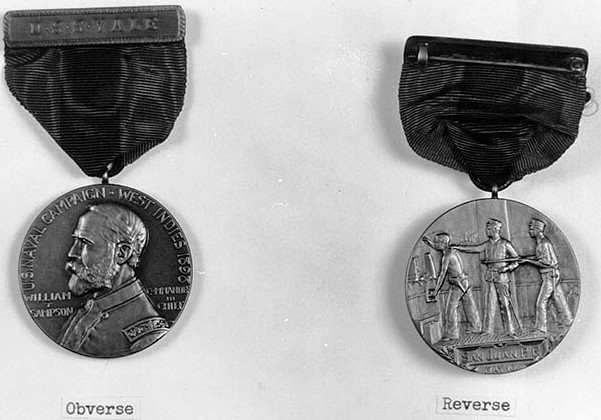
Reverse side of Sampson Medal

The Sampson Medal was a U.S. Navy campaign medal. The medal was authorized by an Act of Congress in 1901. The medal was awarded to those personnel who served on ships in the fleet of Rear Admiral William T. Sampson during combat operations in the waters of the West Indies and Cuba. The Sampson Medal was also known as the West Indies Naval Campaign Medal, not to be confused with the West Indies Campaign Medal which was a separate award. A similar commemorative decoration was the Dewey Medal, considered senior to the Sampson Medal.

== Creation ==
The Sampson Medal was first authorized by a Joint resolution of the United States Congress on March 3, 1901. The resolution authorized the Secretary of the Navy to have produced bronze medals to commemorate naval engagements in the West Indies and on the shores of Cuba during the Spanish–American War. The medal was to be presented to the officers and men of the United States Navy and Marine Corps who participated in engagements and battles that were deemed to be of sufficient importance to merit their commemoration.

The resolution also stipulated that those who might be eligible for recognition for participation in more than one engagement would not receive a second medal, but would receive a "bronze bar appropriately inscribed, to be attached to the ribbon by which the medal is suspended."

== Appearance ==
The obverse of the medal was designed by Charles E. Barber. It depicts a bust of Admiral Sampson. The reverse was designed by George T. Morgan. It depicts a Navy officer, Sailor, and Marine standing upon a block identifying the action for which the medal was awarded. Suspending the ribbon of the medal is a brooch pin with the name of the recipient's ship. The recipient's name is engraved on the lower rim of the medal, this being one of only two medals officially issued named to a recipient.

Campaign clasps or engagement bars were authorized for wear on the ribbon, showing various battles and the ship name which had participated. The medal was issued for 47 engagements or skirmishes and some were awarded with several engagement bars. When worn as a ribbon on a military uniform, there were no devices authorized.
