= Asa Walker =

American rear admiral (1845–1916)

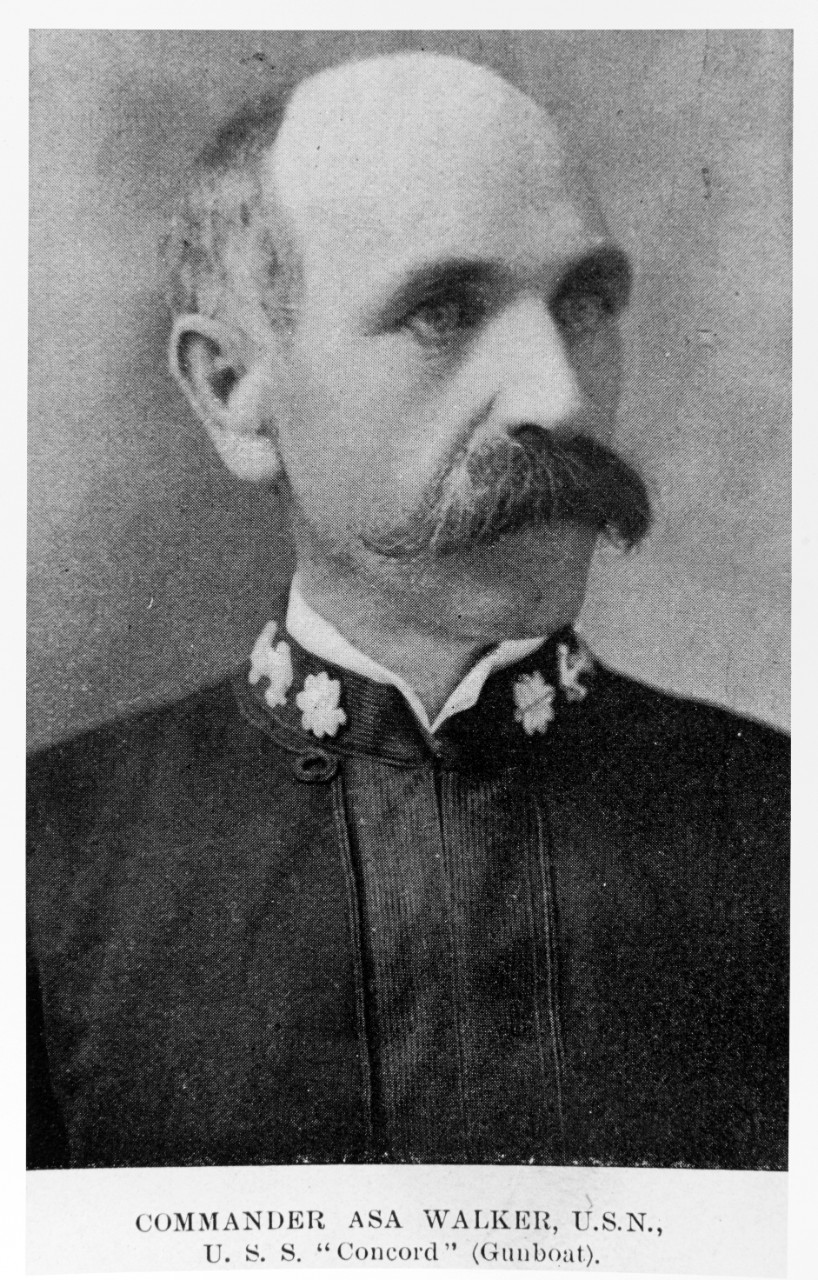
- Born: November 13, 1845; Portsmouth, New Hampshire, U.S.
- Died: March 7, 1916 (aged 70); Annapolis, Maryland, U.S.
- Burial place: United States Naval Academy Cemetery
- Military career
- Allegiance: United States
- Branch: United States Navy
- Service years: 1862–1907
- Rank: Rear admiral
- Commands: USS Concord
- Conflicts: Spanish-American War: Pacific Theater; Battle of Manila Bay
- Other work: Superintendent of the United States Naval Observatory

Rear Admiral Asa Walker (1845–1916) was a career officer in the United States Navy in the late nineteenth and early twentieth centuries. He commanded the gunboat USS Concord (PG-3) at the Battle of Manila Bay and served as superintendent of the United States Naval Observatory.

== Biography ==
Walker was born in Portsmouth, New Hampshire, on November 13, 1845. He entered the United States Naval Academy at Annapolis, Maryland, on November 21, 1862, and graduated on June 6, 1866.

After graduating he served more than a year on the USS Sacramento, from which he was assigned to the Portsmouth Navy Yard as an ordnance officer. In 1868 he went to the Pacific station, where he served three years, doing duty on the Rosana, Lackawanna, Saranac, and Jamestown. While in these assignments Walker was commissioned an ensign on March 12, 1868; a master on March 26, 1869; and a lieutenant on March 21, 1870.

From 1871 to 1872 he received torpedo training. The following year he performed special duties on the Powhatan. Late in 1873 he returned to the Naval Academy, where he was posted until 1876, when he was sent to the South Atlantic station, serving on the Essex for three years. Between 1879 and 1883 he was assigned to the Naval Academy. From that time until 1886 he remained at the Asiatic station, serving on the Trenton and Monocacy.

On December 12, 1884, while on the Trenton, he was promoted to the rank of lieutenant commander. From 1886 to August 1890 he again served at the Naval Academy. He was then placed on waiting orders until October 1891, when he was attached to the monitor Miantonomah. Two years later he was given commanded of the Bancroft, from March to July 1893. From that time until 1897 he was on duty at the Naval Academy.

In April 1894, he was commissioned a commander, and from May 1897 to May 1899, had command of the gunboat USS Concord. He commanded the Concord at the Battle of Manila Bay on May 1, 1898. For meritorious services during the battle he was advanced nine numbers in grade.

From August 1899 to October 1900, he was stationed at the Naval War College in Newport, Rhode Island. While there, on September 9, 1899, he was promoted to captain. In October 1900, he became a member of the Navy Examining Board in Washington, D.C., and served until 1901 when he assumed command of the cruiser USS San Francisco.

From March to April 1904, he was a member of the Navy General Board under Admiral of the Navy George Dewey, his commander at the Battle of Manila Bay. He then assumed command of the receiving ship Wabash at the Boston Navy Yard.

He was promoted to rear admiral on January 7, 1906, and on February 28, 1906, he was appointed superintendent of the United States Naval Observatory in Washington, D.C. He held this assignment until he was retired after having reached the mandatory retirement age of 62 on November 13, 1907.

In retirement he lived in Annapolis, Maryland, where he died on March 7, 1916, at the age of 70. He is buried in the United States Naval Academy Cemetery.
