= VideoRay UROVs =

Series of inspection class remotely operated underwater vehicles

VideoRay ROVs are a series of inspection class underwater submersible remotely operated underwater vehicles (ROV). VideoRay ROVs are operated from a suitcase-sized control panel connected to either a copper or fiber-optic tether which is then connected to the submersible.

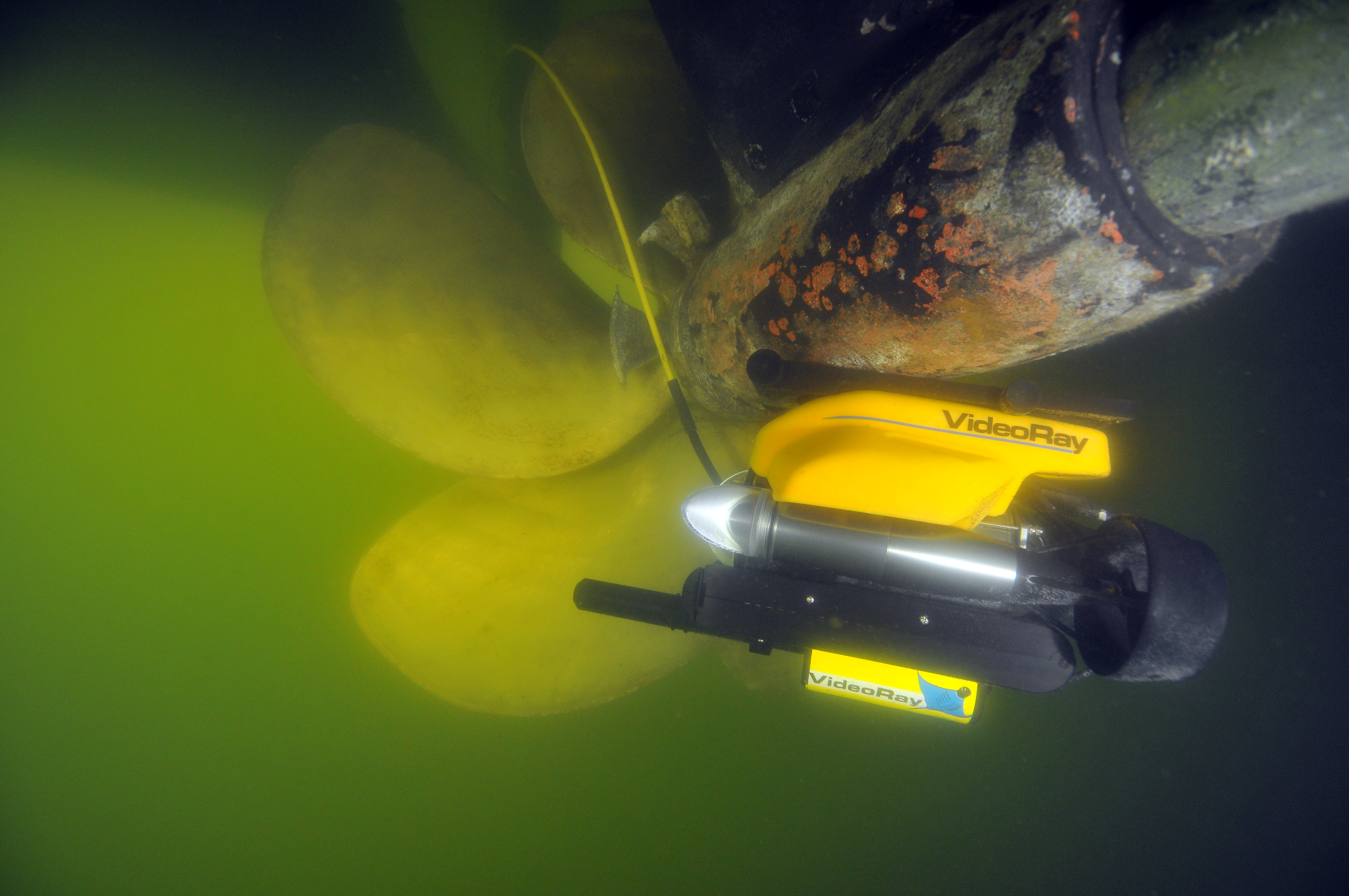
VideoRay Pro 4 ROV equipped with radiation sensor and hull crawler

VideoRay has several different units with depth ratings ranging from 250 feet (76 m) up to 3,280 feet (1,000 m) and are utilized in a variety of underwater applications including: aquaculture & fishery operations; forensics & crime scene investigation; search & rescue missions; port security operations; recreational yachting; sport fishing & underwater marine life observation; shipwreck & treasure exploration; science, research and marine habitat mapping; inland dam inspection; offshore oil & gas rig observation; and various other underwater observation applications.

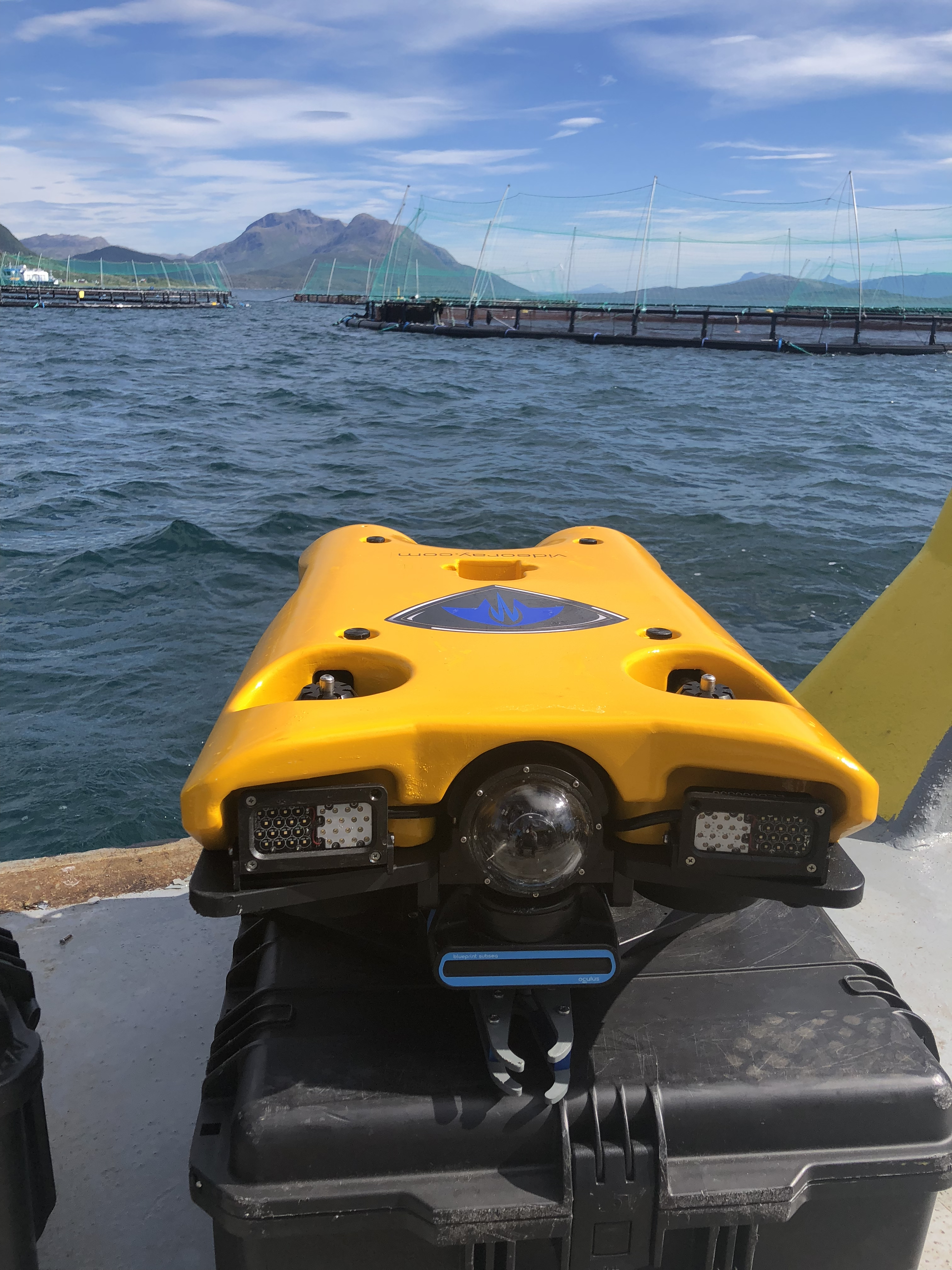
VideoRay Defender on a fish farm in Norway.

Using attachments such as scanning and imaging sonars, positioning systems and manipulators, the ROVs carry out port security and ship inspections and deep-sea wreck location, filming, and exploration. The United States Army Corps of Engineers, U.S. Immigration and Customs Enforcement, New York Police Department (NYPD), Fugro, Port of Long Beach Harbor Patrol, and fourteen branches of the Maritime Safety and Security Team (MSST) of the United States Coast Guard are amongst its users.

== Company ==
Founded in 1999, VideoRay LLC quickly became the world's largest volume producer of underwater ROVs and the global leader in MicroROV technology. As of July 2018, more than 3,000 VideoRay ROVs have been delivered worldwide.

Located in Pottstown, Pennsylvania, VideoRay focuses on local initiatives as well as international business. Despite significant business and revenue growth, nearly every aspect of VideoRay still operates out of this facility. Dealers in 33 countries provide a global reach for VideoRay owners across the globe, but every purchase order comes directly to this office where the ROVs are designed, manufactured, shipped, and repaired.

In November 2012, the TriCounty Area Chamber of Commerce presented VideoRay LLC with the Economic Development Award in recognition of VideoRay's efforts to bring a booming international business to the Pottstown borough. The Economic Development Award honors a local company that best exhibits quality land use improvement, generates economic benefits for the community, and has the potential for creating new jobs. In March 2008 the Chester County Economic Development Council presented VideoRay LLC with the prestigious 2008 Globe Award for its distinguished achievement in international business.

In May 2018, VideoRay was awarded "Member Company of the Year" from the World Trade Center of Greater Philadelphia for their industry and global leadership.

VideoRay is an associated member of the MTS (Marine Technology Society), ASDSO (Association of State Dam Safety Officials), DEMA, and NDIA (National Defense Industrial Association).

== Notable Missions ==
Notable missions include under-ice investigation in Antarctica, Cenote exploration in the Yucatan for Mayan artifacts, the first ever penetration and observation of the USS Arizona that lies in Pearl Harbor, Hawaii, a search for the Loch Ness Monster, and other deep sea operations.

VideoRays have also been featured in several broadcast productions, especially on the National Geographic Channel. VideoRay was featured prominently in the recent NatGeo documentary Dark Secrets of the Lusitania which documented a 2011 exploration of the RMS Lusitania wreck off the Irish coast. The ROV captured images of interior compartments and recovered artifacts that have not been seen since the ship's sinking in 1917.
