= USS Sterling =

Collier of the United States Navy

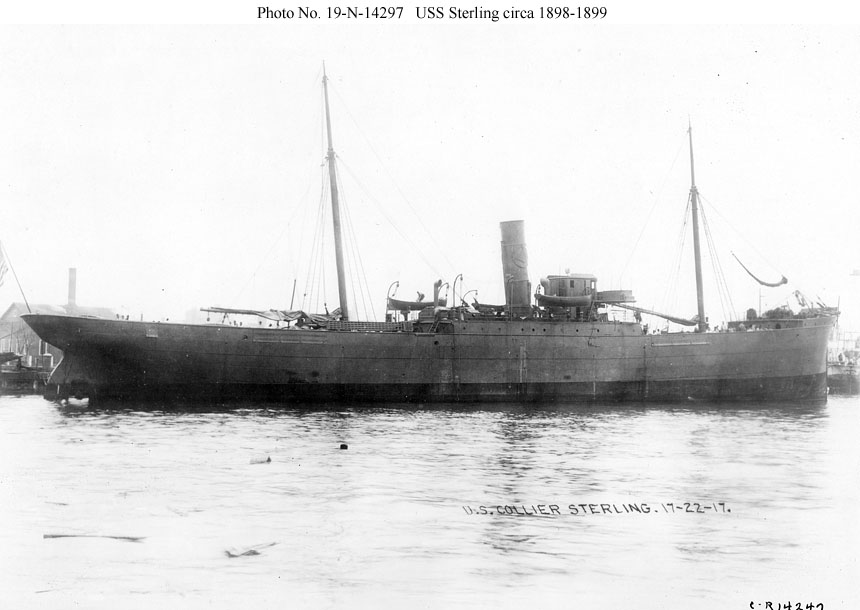
- Collier Sterling in late 1898 or early 1899

History

United Kingdom
- Name: SS Lamington
- Builder: Robert Duncan & Company
- Launched: 24 August 1881
- Fate: Ran aground 5 February 1896, salvaged by Merritt Salvage Company.

History

United States
- Name: SS Sterling
- Acquired: July 1896
- Reclassified: Collier (ship)
- Home port: Boston, MA
- Fate: Sold to the U.S. Navy in April 1898.

History

United States
- Name: USS Sterling
- Acquired: 9 April 1898
- Commissioned: 16 April 1898
- Decommissioned: 7 July 1919
- Stricken: 3 August 1919
- Fate: Sold to Chile in 1919

History

Chile
- Name: SS Llai Llai
- Namesake: Llay-Llay, Chile
- Acquired: 15 September 1919
- Renamed: 1919
- Fate: Sunk due to collision at sea, 11 March 1920

General characteristics
- Type: Collier
- Displacement: 5,660 long tons (5,751 t)
- Length: 284 ft 0 in (86.56 m)
- Beam: 37 ft 0 in (11.28 m)
- Draft: 22 ft 6 in (6.86 m)
- Propulsion: 926 hp
- Speed: 11 knots (20 km/h; 13 mph)
- Capacity: 2,600 tons (coal)
- Complement: 60 (merchantmen); U.S. Navy crew: 5 officers and 44 enlisted
- Armament: 2 × 6-pounder guns
- Notes: Compound engine, single screw

United States Navy Auxiliary ship Sterling was an iron, schooner-rigged collier in service with the United States Navy from 1898 to 1919. Originally purchased to transport coal for United States Navy ships during the Spanish–American War, she served in that role until sold in 1919. While serving as the Chilean flagged steamer, Llai Llai, she was rammed by a Chilean warship on 11 March 1920 and sank near Iquique, Chile.

== Commercial service history ==
The USS Sterling was built by Robert Duncan and Company, Port Glasgow, Scotland. Originally christened as SS Lamington, she was launched on 23 August 1881 for the shipping firm Renton and Company, Glasgow, who planned to use her on their Adelaide, Melbourne, and Sydney, Australia route. By July 1891, Lamington was transporting coal from the east coast of the United States, when she was rammed by the Old Dominion Steamship Company's Guyandotte off Lambert's Point, Virginia.

On 5 February 1896 the Lamington, hauling fruit from Valencia, Spain to New York City ran aground 15 miles east of the Fire Island Lighthouse. Life saving crews from the Coast Guard Stations at Blue Point, Lone Hill and Bellport were able to rescue much of her crew from the wreck using breeches buoys on the first day. Salvage operations began almost immediately by men and tugs from the Merritt Wrecking Company, which likely kept her from breaking up during a storm that swept waves in over the deck and pushed her farther inland. At the first break in the storm the remaining crew, and one small Spanish pony, were rescued. After her cargo was removed, she was refloated on 26 February and towed to New York.

The Merritt Company, awarded the salvage rights to the battered wreck of the Lamington, sold it for 17,500 dollars to C. A. Campbell and Company of Boston, Massachusetts, who planned to use her to work the coal trade. By April 1897, with her home port in Boston and renamed Sterling, she was moving coal along the United States' Atlantic coast, from as far south as Newport News, Virginia to as far north as Portsmouth, New Hampshire.

== Acquisition and commissioning ==
The United States Navy purchased the Sterling for 190,000 dollars from C. A. Campbell and Company in April 1898. Retaining her merchant name, she was commissioned on 16 April 1898.

== Military service history ==
=== Spanish–American War, 1898 ===
Pressed immediately into service during the Spanish–American War, Sterling was assigned to support the Flying Squadron from 1 through 24 May 1898. The Flying Squadron's commander, Commodore Winfield S. Schley, noted the Sterling lacked a hoisting engine, and deemed her insufficient for coaling his forces. She was then assigned to the North Atlantic Squadron where, on 27 May, Rear Admiral William T. Sampson sent her, under escort of the USS New Orleans to join the blockade of Santiago de Cuba. Should it have been necessary to prevent the Spanish fleet from leaving, Sterling was to have been sunk at the narrowest part (determined to be 300 feet wide) of the channel leading into the harbor. That requirement never materialized, and the Sterling performed her primary mission of coaling warships.

Through the remainder of the Spanish–American War and until 1899, Sterling operated along the eastern coast of the United States and in the Caribbean area as a collier. On 31 December 1898, Sterling left Montevideo for San Juan, Puerto Rico, where she took the crippled USS Topeka in tow to Norfolk, Virginia for repairs. It was at this time the Great Blizzard of 1899 struck the Norfolk area and nearly dashed the Sterling on the breakwater near Cape Henlopen. Despite dragging both anchors and full steam on, a shipwreck was only diverted due to a fortunate shift in the wind. Despite a hole in her bow, Sterling was immediately ordered to sail for Boston and join the Topeka.

Arriving in Boston around 17 February 1899, she was placed out of commission (likely to repair her damaged bow), on 1 March 1899. In November of that year, due to shortage of funds, repair work was stopped.

=== Ordered to Asiatic Squadron, 1900 ===
In early August 1900, repairs were ordered resumed for the Sterling. By late September, repairs were completed at the Charlestown Navy Yard and Sterling was one of seven colliers identified to support Admiral George C. Remey's Asiatic Squadron. Despite these orders, there is no record of Sterling leaving Boston until November 1901.

=== Atlantic Fleet, 1901–1910 ===
By 13 November 1901, Sterling was recommissioned, with orders to Lambert's Point to load coal for Guantanamo. Before she could resume her role of carrying coal for the Atlantic Fleet, she and the USS Illinois were ordered to New Orleans, Louisiana to support testing a new floating dry dock there. Sterling was successfully floated in the dry dock on 2 January 1902, fulfilling the preliminary trials prior to full test using Illinois. On 6 January, the Illinois was successfully raised by the floating dock and by the 14th Sterling left New Orleans.

On May 8, 1902, Mont Pelée erupted and completely destroyed Saint-Pierre, Martinique killing 30,000 people. United States Secretary of the Navy William H. Moody ordered Yates Stirling, the commanding officer of United States forces at San Juan, Puerto Rico, to fit out the Sterling with supplies so she could make way for Martinique immediately. As the collier's captain was a merchantman, Commander George W. Mentz was ordered aboard to command her overall relief efforts. On 16 May, Sterling arrived in Fort-de-France with the United States' first installment of relief supplies and was still anchored nearby when she witnessed Mt. Pelée's subsequent eruption on May 20. For the remainder of 1902 she was active along the east coast, transporting coal and supporting naval war games, until late in December when she was damaged in a collision with the USS Texas off Culebra, Puerto Rico. Quickly repaired, she was back in operation within two months.

In June and July 1903, the battleships Kearsarge, Illinois, Alabama, Massachusetts and colliers Lebanon, Caesar and Sterling participated in a transatlantic "race" from Tompkinsville to the Azores to determine how well the four battleships could stay together at various speeds over long distances.

The 1906 Report of the Secretary of the Navy notes the Sterling was in the Norfolk Navy Yard undergoing repairs in August 1904. In early 1905, she supported Rear Admiral Sigsbee's Caribbean division of the North Atlantic Squadron. In August 1905 she was placed out of service, pending almost 24,000 dollars of repair work, at League Island where she remained through August 1906. After recommissioning on 24 August, she resumed regular coaling duties through May 1908. Of significance during this time, Sterling along with USS Hannibal, USS Marcellus, and USS Nanshan, accompanied the Great White Fleet from Hampton Roads, Virginia to Port of Spain, Trinidad, the first refueling stop along the fleet's circumnavigation of the world.

On 13 May 1908, she was placed in reserve at Boston. She was recommissioned on 24 November 1908 and resumed collier service along the Atlantic coast and the West Indies. In December, while searching for coal barges that had broken loose from their tug, Sterling's crew rescued the two master M. E. Eldridge, her crew exhausted after losing her sails in a storm and being adrift for over two days. The 1910 Report indicates that she was out of service on 30 April, berthed at the Portsmouth Navy Yard, New Hampshire for repair.

She was back in service from 15 August 1911 to 29 May 1912 when, at Norfolk, Virginia, she underwent a repair survey. In August 1912, Sterling transported the foremast of the battleship Maine, which was blown up in Havana Harbor in 1898, from Governor's Island to Annapolis, where it was later erected on the grounds of the Naval Academy. In late December 1912, Sterling transported naval aviators, their aircraft and other necessary supplies and equipment from the Naval Academy to Guantanamo, Cuba to establish a Naval Aviation training camp during the Atlantic Fleet's winter maneuvers. She resumed regular coaling assignments through 9 August 1913, when she was placed out of service.

She was still assigned to the Norfolk Navy Yard on 1 January 1914, but was recommissioned on 2 February 1916. On 16 February 1916, Sterling left Norfolk, Virginia with supplies for the gunboat Des Moines, medicine funded by the American Jewish Relief Committee and 60,000 pounds of matzoth paid for by Hebrew Sheltering and Immigrant Aid Society for Jewish sufferers in Palestine. After arriving in Naples around 3 April, Germany denied her clearance to Egypt so the supplies were delivered by other means.

=== World War I ===
Sterling spent the remainder of World War I supplying American bases and ships with fuel to maintain a steady flow of men and materiel to the battlefields in Europe. She served with the Atlantic Fleet Train until 9 January 1918, when the Naval Overseas Transportation Service (NOTS) was established.

On 19 April 1917, Sterling was so badly damaged in a collision with the USS Nereus in Hampton Roads, her commander beached her off Sewell's Point to avoid sinking. While still resting on a sandbar with water reaching her second deck, she was deemed salvageable by Navy inspectors.

On 6 May 1919, Sterling was reassigned to the 3d Naval District for decommissioning and disposal. She was decommissioned at Philadelphia on 7 July 1919, and her name was struck from the Navy list on 3 August 1919. On 15 September, she was sold to F & H Starr, of New York City.

== Awards ==
- Spanish Campaign Medal
- World War I Victory Medal (with Transport clasp)

== Collision and loss at sea ==
In late 1919, she was resold to the Anglo-South American Bank at Valparaíso, registered as a Chilean steamship, and renamed Llai Llai (for a town in Chile). On 11 March 1920, she was en route to load a cargo of nitrate and collided with the Chilean armored cruiser O'Higgins and sank near Iquique, Chile.

== See also ==
- Roberts, Stephen S. "US Navy Auxiliary Ships: Sterling (AC, 1898)". Register of Ships of the U.S. Navy: Auxiliary Vessels 1835-1945.
