= USS Marcellus =

Collier of the United States Navy

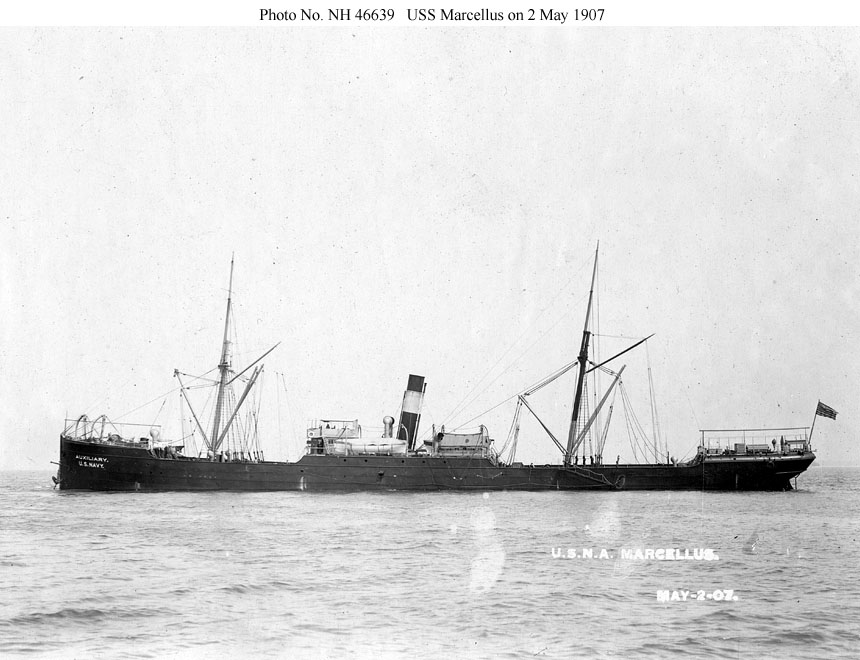
- Collier Marcellus on 2 May 1907

History

United States
- Name: USS Marcellus
- Builder: Mounsey and Foster
- Launched: April 1879
- Acquired: 13 June 1898
- Commissioned: 28 September 1898
- Renamed: 28 September 1898
- Stricken: 22 September 1910
- Fate: Sunk due to collision at sea, 9 August 1910

General characteristics
- Type: Collier
- Displacement: 4,315 long tons (4,384 t)
- Length: 295 ft 3 in (89.99 m)
- Beam: 35 ft 1 in (10.69 m)
- Draft: 21 ft 3 in (6.48 m)
- Propulsion: 1200 hp
- Speed: 11 knots (20 km/h; 13 mph)
- Capacity: 2,400 tons (coal)
- Complement: 68 officers and enlisted (U.S. Navy crew)
- Armament: 2 × 6-pounder guns (removed 1899)

USS Marcellus was an iron schooner-rigged collier United States Navy Auxiliary ship in service with the United States Navy from 1898 to 1910. She participated in the U.S. Navy's first efforts in coaling warships while underway at sea. She was rammed by a commercial steamer in the early morning hours of 9 August 1910 and sank that afternoon without loss of life.

== Acquisition and commissioning ==
The USS Marcellus was built by Mounsey and Foster, South Dock, Sunderland, England. Originally christened as SS Mercedes, she was launched on 5 April 1879 for the British shipping firm Adamson & Ronaldson. In September 1881 she was purchased by the Dutch Stoomvaart Maatschappij Insulinde and renamed SS C. Fellinger. In 1886, she was obtained by Adolf Kirsten's Hamburg Pacific Dampfschiffs Linie (HPDL) and renamed as SS Titania. In 1898, she changed owners again when HPDL sold its ships to their competitor, Deutsche Dampfschifffahrts-Gesellschaft Kosmos.

She was purchased from William Lamb by the United States Navy on 13 June 1898 for service in the Spanish–American War and named for Marcus Claudius Marcellus. As was the practice of the time, many colliers purchased to support the war were named for classic characters. Commissioned as USNA Marcellus in Boston, Massachusetts on 28 September 1898, with Lieutenant Commander J. H. Winslow in command.

== Service history ==
=== Spanish–American War, 1898 ===
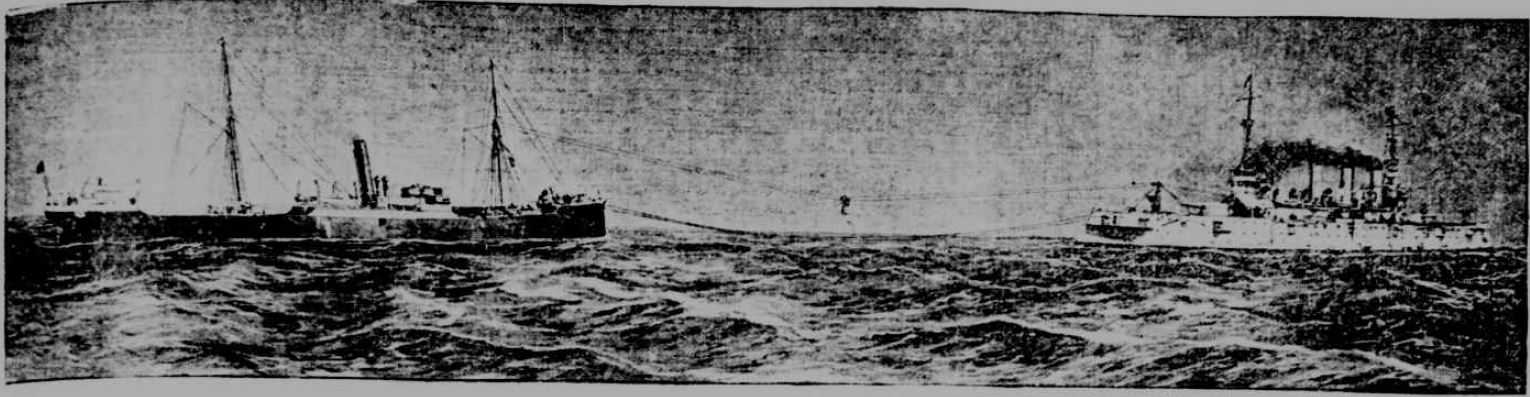
Marcellus coaling the cruiser New York at sea in 1899

During the Spanish–American War, following a brief cruise along the east coast, Marcellus sailed from Lambert's Point, Virginia on 4 January 1899 to carry coal and supplies to American forces at Havana, Cuba.

At the end of the war, she returned to the Norfolk Navy Yard and her guns were removed. She was subsequently placed in reserve on 8 March 1899.

In November 1899, outside Sandy Hook, the first real recorded underway replenishment (UNREP) at sea was performed by the U.S. Navy using the Marcellus and the battleship Massachusetts. This was achieved by the Massachusetts taking Marcellus under tow 300–400 feet astern while steaming along at six knots. The system, devised by Spencer Miller and the Lidgerwood Manufacturing Company of New York, allowed the crew to deliver one 800 pound bag of coal per minute via a cableway strung above the tow cable. While this provided for around 20–24 tons of coal to be transferred per hour, that amount still fell short of the Navy's requirement for 40 tons per hour. For the next 15 years, the U.S. Navy continued to experiment with coaling at sea, eventually developing a rig that could reliably complete this mission.

=== Atlantic Fleet, 1900–1910 ===
From 1900 to 1910, with her homeport near Newport News, Virginia area coal piers, she transported coal along the east and gulf coasts, between New Orleans and Maine, and to ports in the Caribbean, in support of the Atlantic Fleet.

Beginning in January 1900, she operated for five months along the Atlantic coast, carrying coal to Norfolk, Virginia until being placed in ordinary on 4 May 1900 for a 30-day repair period. Upon completion of repair on 11 June, Marcellus accompanied the fleet to Newport, Rhode Island.

In November 1900, her cargo of coal caught fire due to spontaneous combustion. After 1500 tons were removed, it was thought to be extinguished. However, it rekindled later in December. In order to ensure it did not reignite, workmen removed the remaining 600 tons. The Navy initially authorized the necessary work to restore Marcellus to serviceable condition. However, this work was suspended to allow important work on other ships to be completed. Marcellus remained in reserve until 25 November 1902, when repairs were finally completed and she again returned to transporting coal along the Atlantic seaboard, the Gulf Coast and ports in the Caribbean.

Marcellus put into port at Norfolk on 2 March 1904, after long service in tropical waters, for refitting and overhaul. Her crew of merchantmen was discharged at that time and she was placed out of commission. Recommissioned in August, this time with a full complement of U.S. Navy officers and enlisted men under the command of Lieutenant Commander George H. Stafford, she again resumed transporting coal along the east coast.

In May 1905, Marcellus was again used to test an improved method for coaling at sea. The experiment, this time near Cape Henry, involved refueling the battleship Illinois. While the coaling tests at sea achieved a record of thirty five tons an hour steaming at a seven knot speed, the new rig still fell short of Navy expectations.

In December 1907, along with USS Hannibal, USS Sterling, and USS Nanshan, Marcellus accompanied the Great White Fleet from Hampton Roads, Virginia to Port of Spain, Trinidad, the first refueling stop along the fleet's circumnavigation of the world.

Placed out of service, 25 January 1908 in Portsmouth, New Hampshire, she was back in service by 3 April 1909 with her Navy crew replaced by merchantmen. For the next 16 months, she served both as a collier and as a training ship for deck and engineering personnel.

== Collision and loss at sea ==
In August 1910, Marcellus and another collier, Leonidas, were ordered to Guantanamo Bay, for which they cleared Delaware Bay on 7 August. At 2:30 in the morning on 9 August, while 60 miles off Cape Hatteras, North Carolina, Marcellus was rammed by the Norwegian-flagged fruit steamer Rosario di Giorgio. Just over 10 hours later, Marcellus sank with no loss of life, her crew and their belongings having been safely transferred to the Leonidas. The official naval court of inquiry concluded the fault lay with the Rosario di Giorgio, and recommended the government seek recompense from her owners for the value of the Marcellus and her cargo, then placed at US$125,000.

Deemed too expensive to salvage, Marcellus was struck from the Navy list on 22 September 1910. Coincidentally, that was the same day that Rear Admiral Winslow, her first captain, was retired from active duty on account of his age.

== Awards ==
- Spanish Campaign Medal

== See also ==
- List of auxiliaries of the United States Navy
