= Battle of Manila Bay =

1898 battle during the Spanish–American War

Coordinates: 14°30′N 120°45′E

- Part of the Spanish–American War
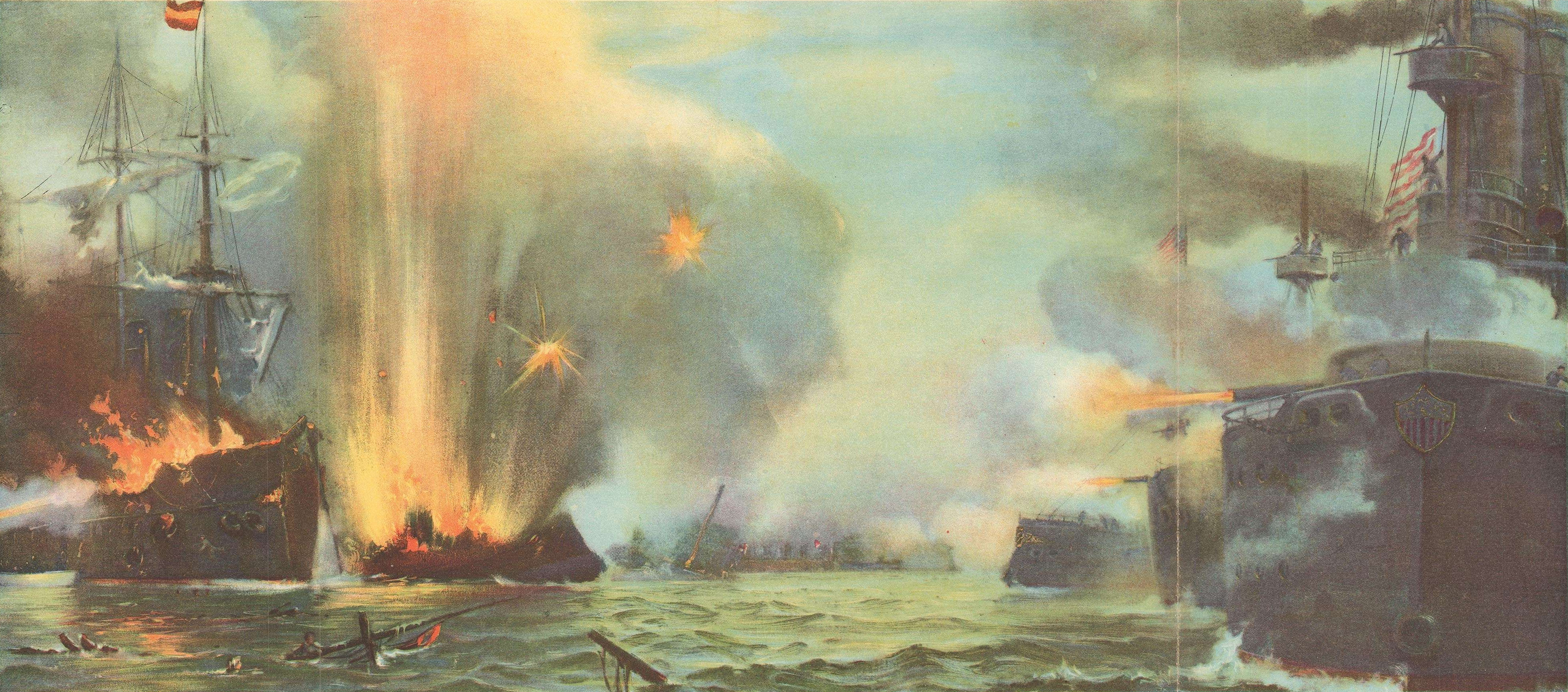
- Battle of Manila Bay, James Gale Tyler
Date	1 May 1898
Location	off Manila, Pacific Ocean
Result	American victory

Belligerents
United States	Spain

Commanders and leaders
George Dewey	Patricio Montojo

Strength
4 protected cruisers 2 gunboats 1 revenue cutter 2 transport ships (Note: Accounts of the numbers of vessels involved vary. Admiral Dewey said, "The Spanish line of battle was formed by the Reina Cristina (flag), Castilla, Don Juan de Austria, Don Antonio de Ulloa, Isla de Luzon, Isla de Cuba, and Marques del Duero." Another source lists the order of battle as consisting of nine U.S. ships (two not engaged) and 13 Spanish ships (five not engaged and one not present). Still another source says that the Spanish naval force consisted of seven unarmored ships. Yet another source says that Dewey's squadron included four cruisers (two armored), two gunboats, and one revenue cutter; and that the Spanish fleet consisted of one modern cruiser half the size of Dewey's Olympia, one old wooden cruiser, and five gunboats.)	2 protected cruisers 5 unprotected cruisers 5 gunboats 1 transport ship

Casualties and losses
1 dead of illness 9 wounded 1 protected cruiser damaged	77 killed 271 wounded 2 protected cruisers scuttled 5 unprotected cruisers sunk 1 gunboat sunk 1 transport ship sunk

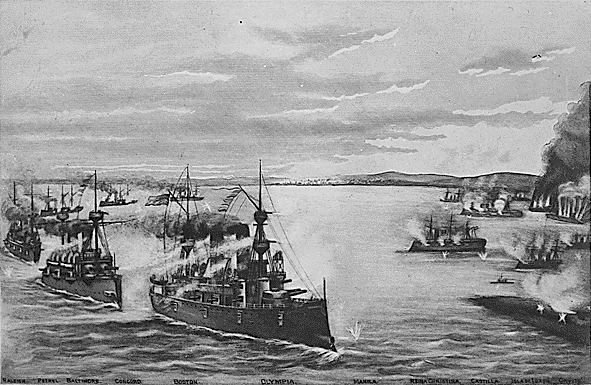
The Battle of Manila Bay, depicted in a lithograph by Butler, Thomas & Company, 1899

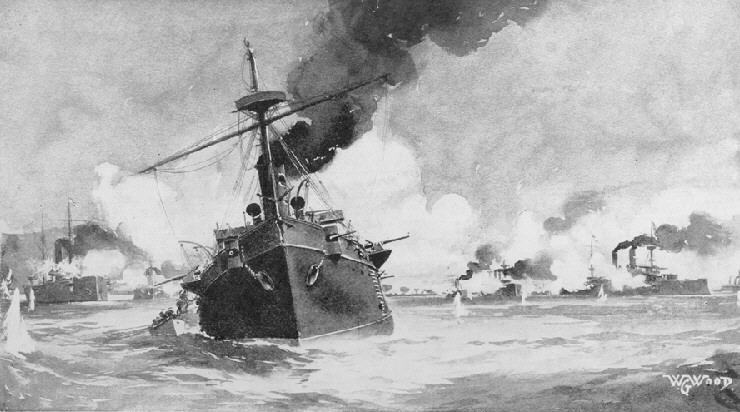
"Battle of Manila Bay", painting by W. G. Wood, circa 1898. Reina Cristina (foreground) in action against Dewey's squadron (right).

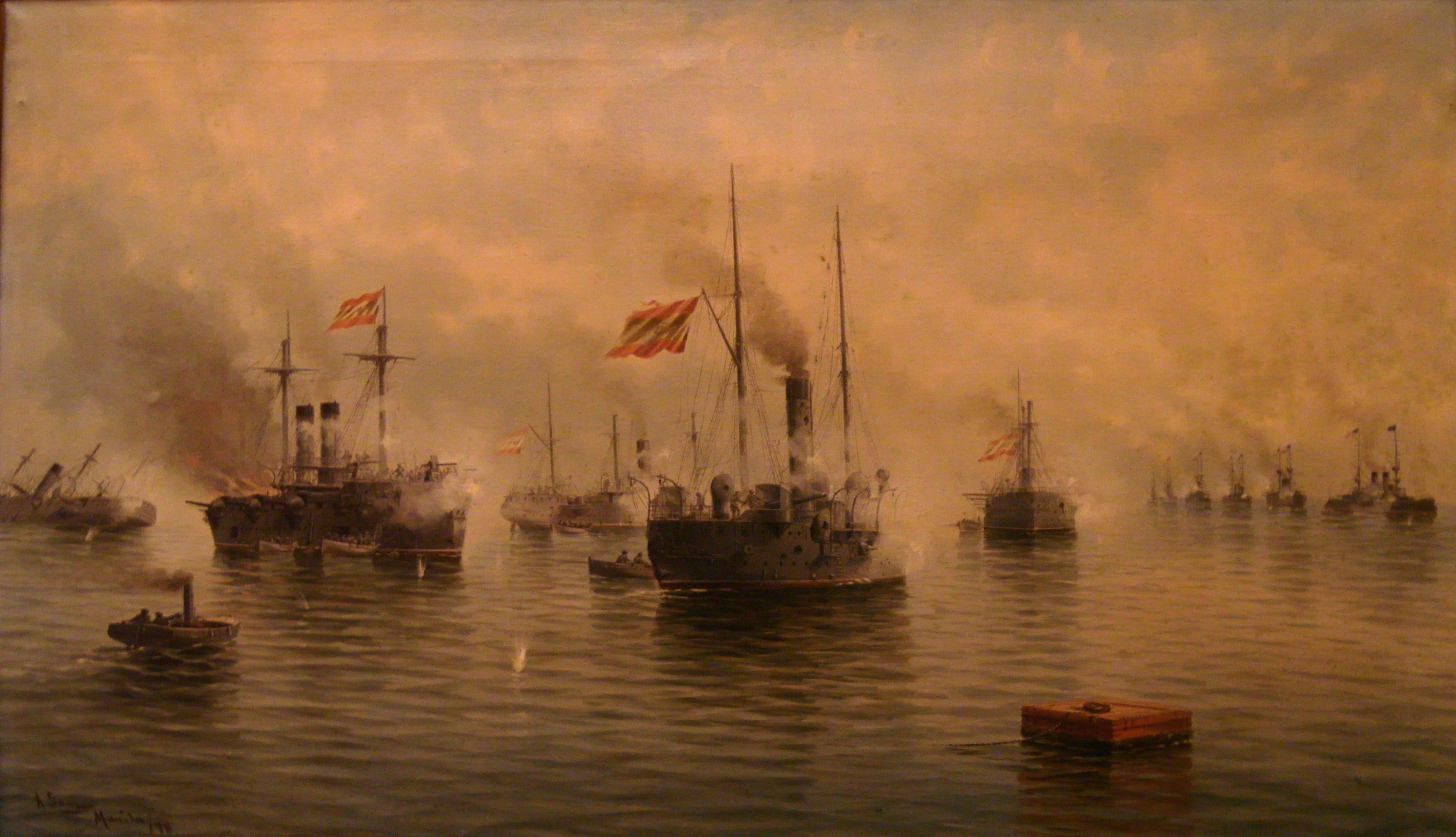
Batalla de Cavite, painted by Ildefonso Sanz Doménech, depicting the Spanish squadron.

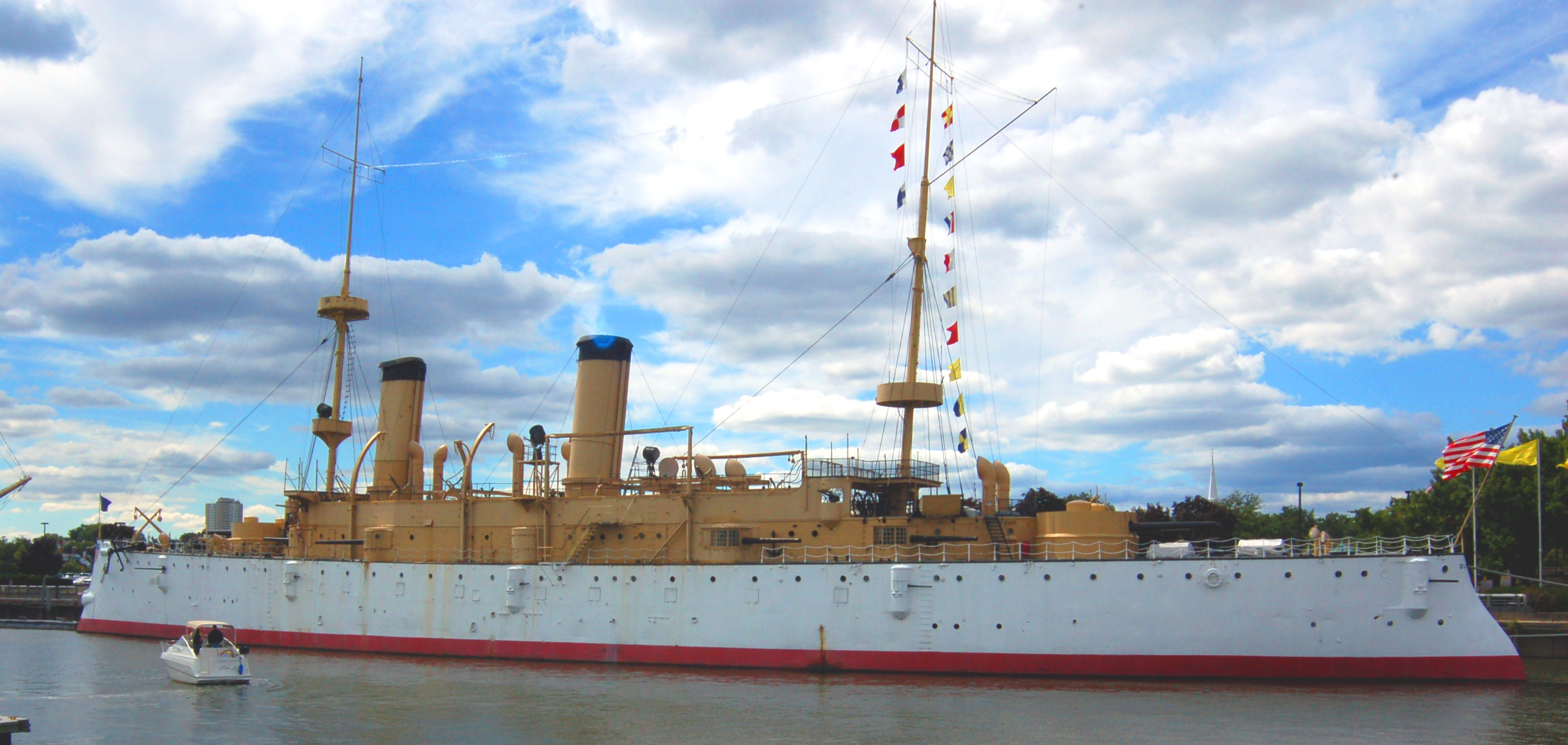
USS Olympia at the Independence Seaport Museum in 2007

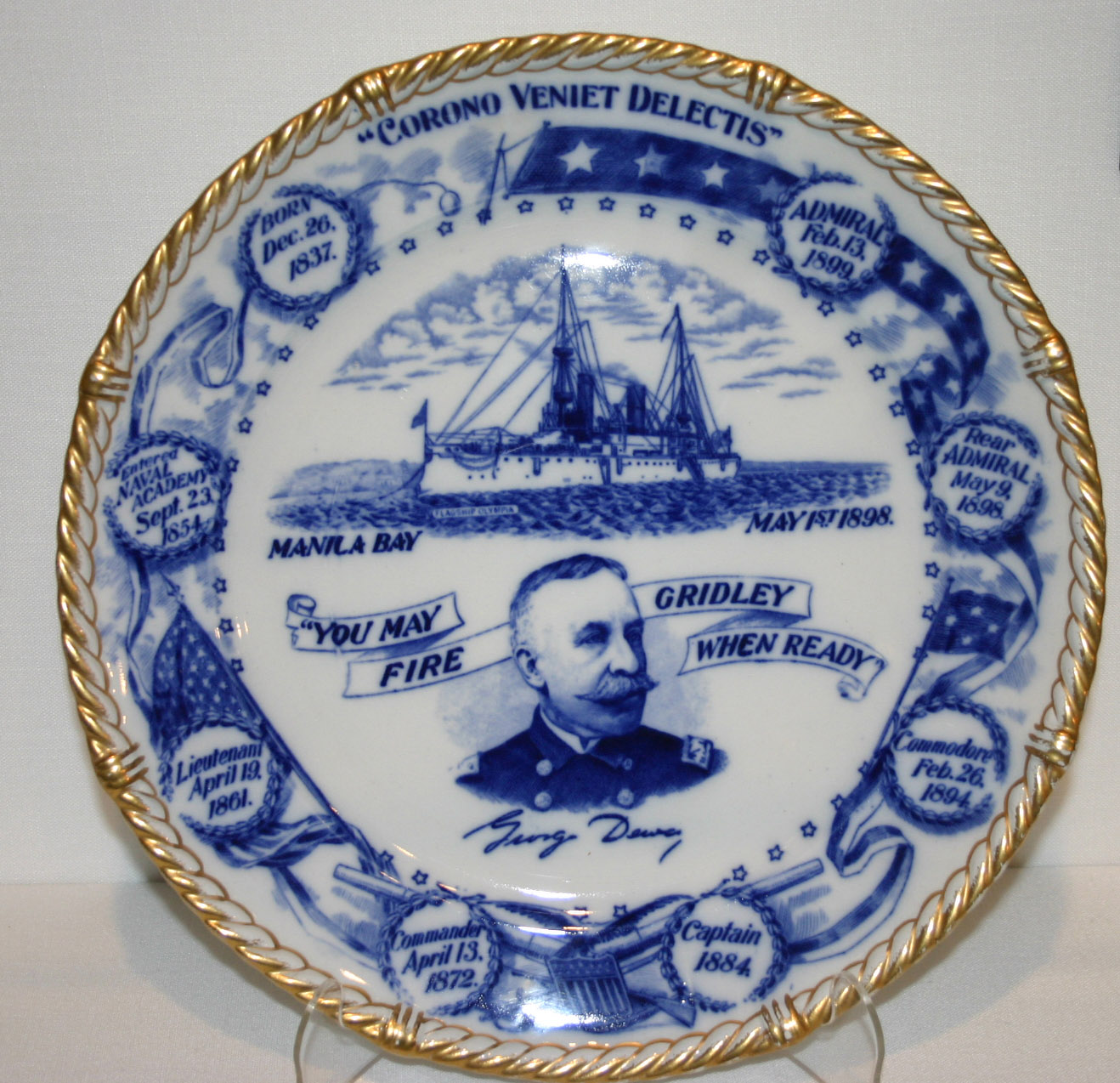
Commemorative plate from the Spanish–American War era honoring George Dewey and his victory.

The Battle of Manila Bay, also known as the Battle of Cavite, took place on May 1, 1898, during the Spanish–American War. The United States Navy's Asiatic Squadron under Commodore George Dewey engaged and destroyed the Spanish Navy's Pacific Squadron under Counter-admiral Patricio Montojo y Pasarón. The battle took place in Manila Bay in the Philippines, and was the first major engagement of the Spanish–American War. The battle was one of the most decisive naval battles in history and marked the end of the Spanish colonial period in Philippine history.

Tensions between Spain and the United States worsened over the Spanish conduct during their efforts to quell the Cuban War of Independence, with many Americans being agitated by largely exaggerated reports of Spanish atrocities against Cubans. In January 1898, fearing the fate of American interests in Cuba due to the war, the cruiser USS Maine was dispatched to protect them. Less than a month later, the warship exploded while lying at anchor in Havana harbor, killing 261 sailors onboard and inflaming American opinion. The U.S. Asiatic Squadron commanded by Dewey, a veteran of the American Civil War, was ordered to Hong Kong on 25 February as a precaution because of the presence of a Spanish fleet in the Philippines.

The U.S. declared a state of war with Spain on 25 April. On 1 May, the American squadron steamed into Manila Bay to engage with the Spanish. The Spanish, aware that they were hopelessly outgunned, made a desperate defense against the Americans. The battle was one sided, with superior American naval gunnery and seamanship ensuring the entire Spanish fleet, mostly made up of older style cruisers and gunboats, would be sunk with only one death (from a heart attack) and nine injuries for the Americans. Upon realizing that the battle was hopeless, Montojo, who had kept his fleet close to the coast to help survivors swim to safety, ordered his two protected cruisers to be scuttled to prevent them from falling into the hands of the Americans. The battle remains one of the most significant naval battles in American maritime history.

== Background ==
Americans living on the West Coast of the United States feared a Spanish attack at the outbreak of the Spanish–American War. Only a few U.S. Navy warships, led by the cruiser USS Olympia, stood between them and a powerful Spanish fleet. In practice, however, Olympia was far superior to the Spanish colonial fleet, as the battle would show.

Counter-admiral Patricio Montojo y Pasarón, a career Spanish Navy officer who had been dispatched rapidly to the Philippines, was equipped with a variety of obsolete vessels. Efforts to strengthen his position amounted to little. The strategy adopted by the Spanish bureaucracy suggested they could not win a war and saw resistance as little more than a face-saving exercise. Administrative actions worked against the effort, sending explosives meant for naval mines to civilian construction companies while the Spanish fleet in Manila was seriously undermanned by inexperienced sailors who had not received any training for over a year. Reinforcements promised from Madrid resulted in only two poorly-armored scout cruisers being sent while at the same time the authorities transferred a squadron from the Manila fleet under Admiral Pascual Cervera to reinforce the Caribbean. Montojo had originally wanted to confront the Americans at Subic Bay, northwest of Manila Bay, but abandoned that idea when he learned the planned mines and coastal defenses were lacking and the cruiser Castilla started to leak. Montojo compounded his difficulties by placing his ships outside the range of Spanish coastal artillery (which might have evened the odds) and choosing a relatively shallow anchorage. His intent seems to have been to spare Manila from bombardment and to allow any survivors of his fleet to swim to safety. The harbor was protected by six shore batteries and three forts whose fire during the battle proved to be ineffective. Only Fort San Antonio Abad had guns with enough range to reach the American fleet, but Dewey never came within their range during the battle.

The Spanish squadron consisted of seven ships: the cruisers Reina Cristina (flagship), Castilla, Don Juan de Austria, Don Antonio de Ulloa, Isla de Luzon, Isla de Cuba, and the gunboat Marques del Duero. The Spanish ships were of inferior quality to the American ships; the Castilla was unpowered and had to be towed by the transport ship Manila. On 25 April, the squadron left Manila Bay for the port of Subic, intending to mount a defense there. The squadron was relying on a shore battery which was to be installed on Isla Grande. On 28 April, before that installation could be completed, a cablegram from the Spanish Consul in Hong Kong arrived with the information that the American squadron had left Hong Kong bound for Subic for the purpose of destroying the Spanish squadron and intending to proceed from there to Manila. The Spanish Council of Commanders, with the exception of the Commander of Subic, felt that no defense of Subic was possible with the state of things, and that the squadron should transfer back to Manila, positioning in shallow water so that the ships could be run aground to save the lives of the crews as a final resort. The squadron departed Subic at 10:30 a.m. on 29 April. Manila, towing Castilla, was last to arrive in Manila Bay, at midnight.

== Battle ==
At 7:00 p.m. on 30 April, Montojo was informed that Dewey's ships had been seen in Subic Bay that afternoon. As Manila Bay was considered unnavigable at night by foreigners, Montojo expected an attack the following morning. However, Oscar F. Williams, the United States Consul in Manila, had provided Dewey with detailed information on the state of the Spanish defenses and the lack of preparedness of the Spanish fleet. Based in part upon this intelligence, Dewey—embarked aboard Olympia—led his squadron into Manila Bay at midnight on 30 April.

Passing the entrance, two Spanish mines exploded but were ineffective as they were well below the draft of any of the ships due to the depth of the water. Inside the bay, ships normally used the north channel between Corregidor Island and the northern coast, and this was the only channel mined. Dewey instead used the unmined south channel between El Fraile and Caballo Islands. The El Fraile battery fired a few rounds but the range was too great. The McCulloch, Nanshan and Zafiro were then detached from the line and took no further part in the fighting. At 5:15 a.m. on 1 May, the squadron was off Manila and the Cavite battery fired ranging shots. The shore batteries and Spanish fleet then opened fire but all the shells fell short as the fleet was still out of range. At 5:41 with the now famous phrase, "You may fire when ready, Gridley", the Olympia's captain was instructed to begin the destruction of the Spanish flotilla.

The U.S. squadron swung in front of the Spanish ships and forts in line ahead, firing their port guns. They then turned and passed back, firing their starboard guns. This process was repeated five times, each time closing the range from 5,000 yards to 2,000 yards. The Spanish forces had been alerted, and most were ready for action, but they were heavily outgunned. Eight Spanish ships, the land batteries, and the forts returned fire for two and a half hours although the range was too great for the guns on shore. Five other small Spanish ships were not engaged.

Montojo accepted that his cause was hopeless and ordered his ships to ram the enemy if possible. He then slipped the Cristina's cables and charged. Much of the U.S. fleet's fire was then directed at her and she was shot to pieces. Of the crew of 400, more than 200, including Montojo, were casualties and only two men remained who were able to man her guns. The ship managed to return to shore and Montojo ordered it to be scuttled. The Castilla, which only had guns on the port side, had her forward cable shot away, causing her to swing about, presenting her weaponless starboard side. The captain then ordered her sunk and abandoned. The Ulloa was hit by a shell at the waterline that killed her captain and disabled half the crew. The Luzon had three guns out of action but was otherwise unharmed. The Duero lost an engine and had only one gun left able to fire.

At 7:45 a.m., after a miscommunication led Captain Gridley to report that only 15 rounds of 5-inch ammunition remained per gun, Dewey ordered a temporary withdrawal. In fact, fifteen rounds had been fired per gun, not that only fifteen remained. Confident of the outcome, Dewey then signalled that the crews, who had only had coffee since 4 a.m., should have breakfast. According to an observer on the Olympia, "At least three of his (Spanish) ships had broken into flames but so had one of ours. These fires had all been put out without apparent injury to the ships. Generally speaking, nothing of great importance had occurred to show that we had seriously injured any Spanish vessel." Montojo took the opportunity to now move his remaining ships into Bacoor Bay where they were ordered to resist for as long as possible.

A captains' conference on the Olympia revealed little damage and no men killed. It was discovered that the original ammunition message had been garbled—instead of only 15 rounds of ammunition per gun remaining, the message had meant to say only 15 rounds of ammunition per gun had been expended. Reports arrived during the conference that sounds of exploding ammunition had been heard and fires sighted on the Cristina and Castilla. At 10:40 a.m. action was resumed but the Spanish offered little resistance, and Montojo issued orders for the remaining ships to be scuttled and the breechblocks of their guns taken ashore. The Olympia, Baltimore and Boston then fired on the Sangley Point battery putting it out of action and followed up by sinking the Ulloa. The Concord fired on the transport Mindanao, whose crew immediately abandoned ship. The Petrel fired on the government offices next to the arsenal and a white flag was raised over the building after which all firing ceased. The Spanish colors were struck at 12:40 p.m.

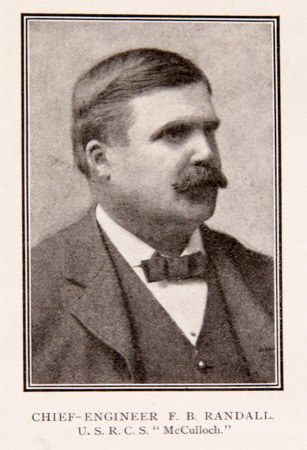
F.B Randall casualty of Battle of Manilla Bay 1898

According to U.S. sources, Dewey won the battle with seven men very slightly wounded, a total of nine injured, and only a single fatality among his crew: Francis B. Randall, Chief Engineer on the McCulloch, from a heart attack. On the other hand, the Spanish naval historian Agustín Rodríguez González suggests that Dewey suffered heavier losses, though still much lower than those of the Spanish squadron. Rodríguez notes that Spanish officials estimated U.S. casualties at 13 crewmen killed and more than 30 wounded based on reliable information collected by the Spanish consulate in Hong Kong. According to Rodríguez, Dewey may have concealed the deaths and injuries by including the numbers among the 155 men who reportedly deserted during the campaign.

== Subsequent action ==
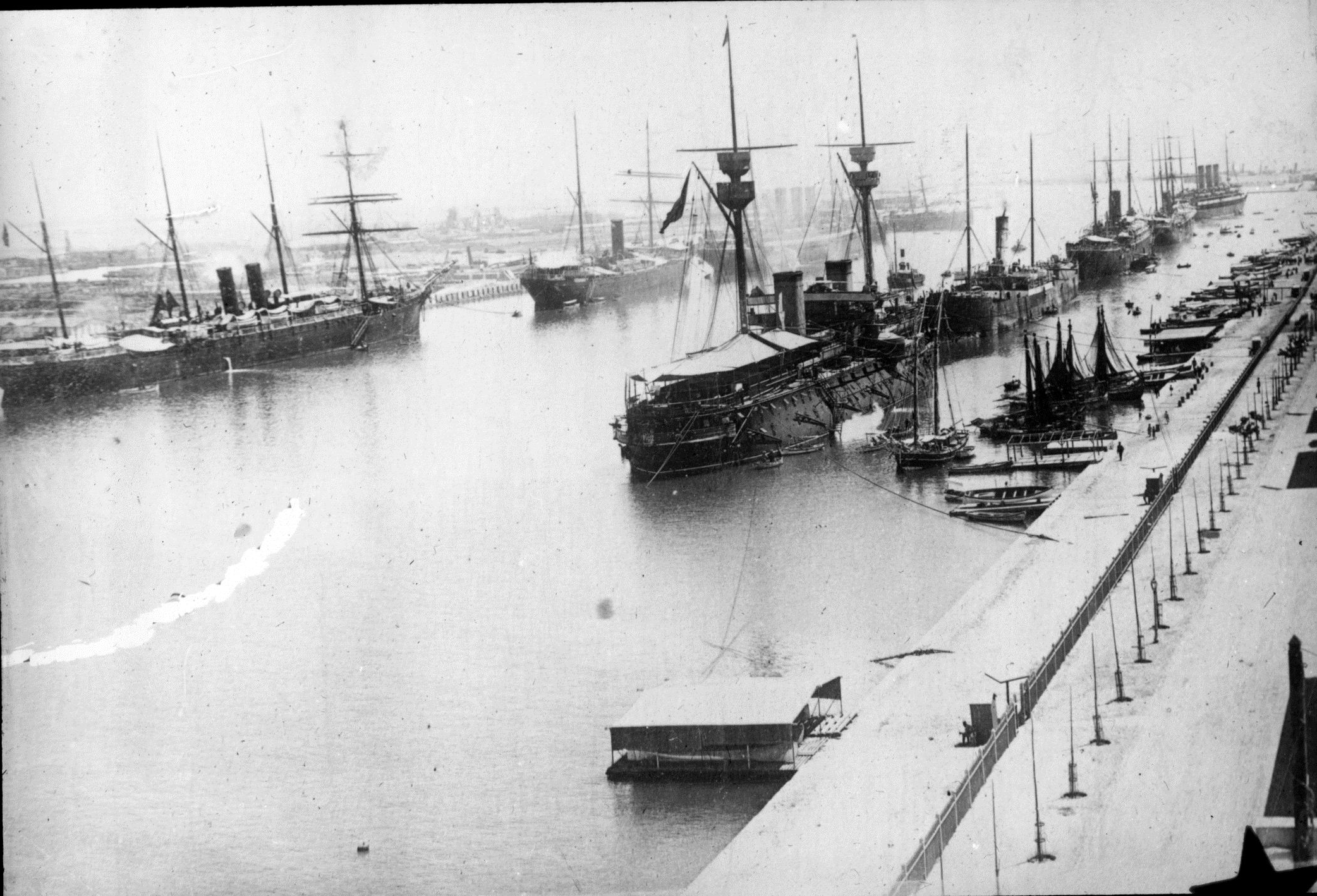
Admiral Cámara's Spanish Fleet anchored in the Suez Canal, formed by the best ships of the Spanish Navy, among others by the battleship Pelayo or the cruiser Emperador Carlos V and who ultimately didn't fight in the war.

A Spanish attempt to attack Dewey with the naval task force known as Camara's Flying Relief Column came to naught, and the naval war in the Philippines devolved into a series of torpedo boat hit-and-run attacks for the rest of the campaign. While the Spanish scored several hits, there were no American fatalities directly attributable to Spanish gunfire.

On 2 May, Dewey landed a force of marines at Cavite. They completed the destruction of the Spanish fleet and batteries and established a guard for the protection of the Spanish hospitals. The resistance of the forts was weak. The Olympia turned a few guns on the Cavite arsenal, detonating its magazine, and ending the fire from the Spanish batteries.

Dewey cabled Washington that he controlled the bay but would need 5,000 additional men to seize the city. The completeness of the victory in the opening stages of the war prompted President McKinley to send additional troops to seize the city. After some consideration, the U.S. War Department began assembling a force of 20,000 volunteers and regulars. In the meantime, before these forces arrived, Dewey returned Emilio Aguinaldo to Manila from exile in Hong Kong, and Aguinaldo retindered the Philippine Revolution seeking independence from Spain.

== Aftermath ==
In recognition of George Dewey's leadership during the Battle of Manila Bay, a special medal known as the Dewey Medal was presented to the officers and sailors under Admiral Dewey's command. Dewey was later honored with promotion to the special rank of Admiral of the Navy. Building on his popularity, Dewey briefly ran for president in 1900, but withdrew and endorsed William McKinley, the incumbent, who won. The same year Dewey was appointed President of the General Board of the United States Navy, where he would play a key role in the growth of the U.S. Navy until his death in January 1917.

Dewey Square in Boston is named after Commodore Dewey, as is Dewey Beach, Delaware. Union Square, San Francisco features a 97 ft (30 m) tall monument to Admiral George Dewey's victory at the Battle of Manila Bay.

== Order of battle ==
Vessels engaged in actual combat during the Battle of Manila Bay ranged in size from 5,870 tons (Olympia) to 492 tons (Marques del Duero).

=== United States ===
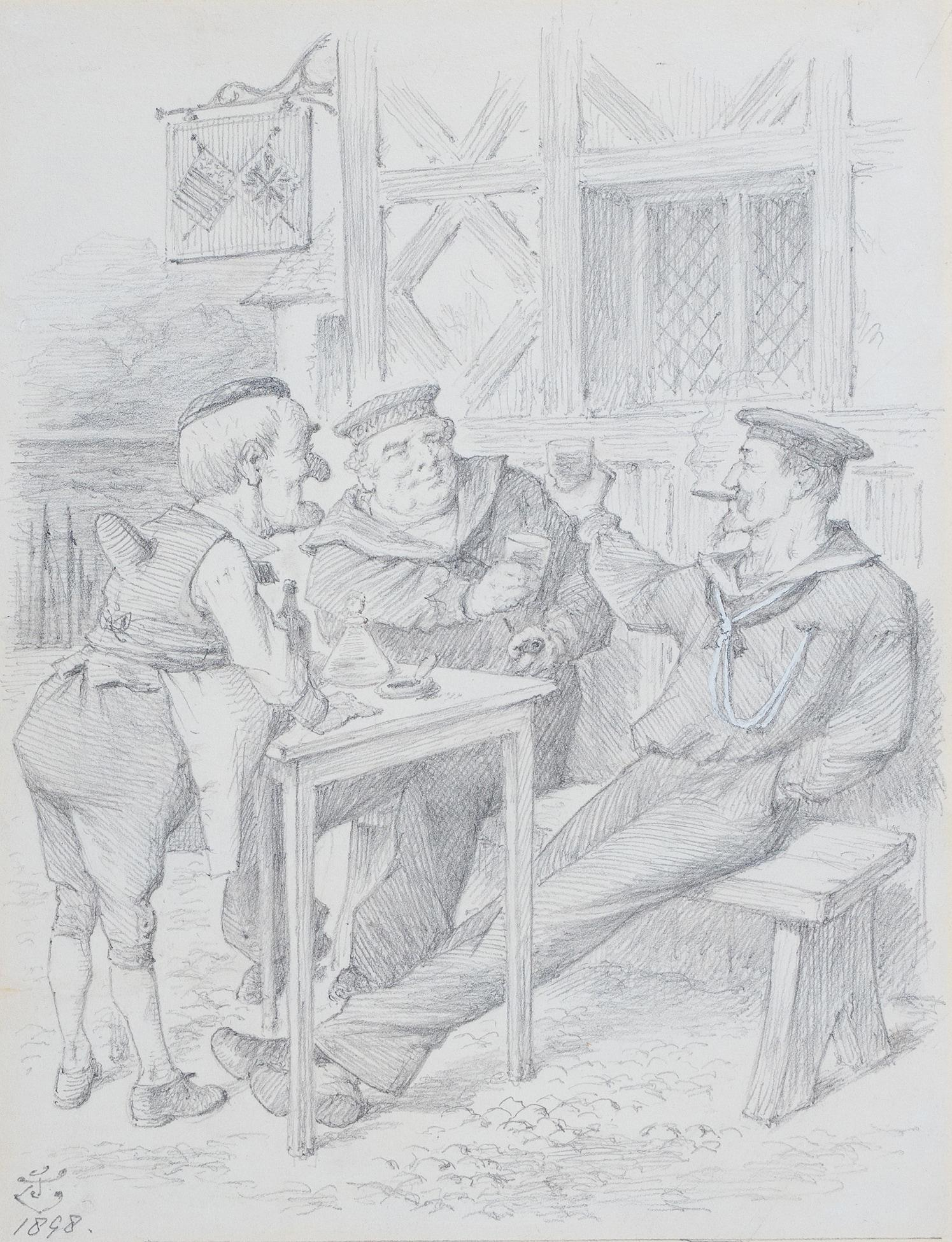
Original pencil drawing for a Punch magazine cartoon, "Mr Punch and Britannia toasting the USA after their defeat of Spain at the Battle of Manila Bay" (1898), by John Tenniel

Engaged Vessels:

- USS Olympia, flagship, protected cruiser of 5,870 tons, with four 8-inch guns mounted in pairs on two turrets, plus ten 5-inch guns and six torpedo tubes. Top speed 20 knots. She is now a museum ship at the Independence Seaport Museum, in Philadelphia, Pennsylvania.
- USS Baltimore, protected cruiser of 4,600 tons, with four 8-inch guns on single mounts, plus six 6-inch guns. Top speed 20 knots.
- USS Raleigh, protected cruiser of 3,200 tons, with one 6-inch and ten 5-inch guns. Top speed 19 knots.
- USS Boston, protected cruiser of 3,200 tons, with two 8-inch and six 6-inch guns. Top speed 13 knots.
- USS Concord, gunboat of 1,710 tons with six 6-inch guns. Top speed 17 knots.
- USS Petrel, gunboat of 867 tons with four 6-inch guns. Top speed 12 knots.

Despite the superiority of the American artillery, the success rate of their guns was minimal, a total of 5,859 shells were expended during the battle. Excluding shells fired at land targets and the unengaged vessels, only 145 hit the seven Spanish engaged vessels. The Reina Cristina and Castilla suffered 81 hits between them, the Don Antonio de Ulloa was hit 33 times, the Don Juan de Austria 13, the Marques del Duero 10, the Isla de Cuba five and the Isla de Luzón was hit three times.

Unengaged vessels:

- The Revenue Cutter McCulloch, the collier Nanshan and the steamer Zafiro (a supply vessel) were directed to keep out of the main action because of their light armament and lack of armor. The McCulloch's chief engineer, Francis B. Randall, died of a heart attack.

=== Spain ===
Engaged vessels:

- Reina Cristina, flagship, unprotected cruiser of 3,042 tons, with six 6.4-inch guns. The fastest Spanish vessel with a top speed of 16 knots.
- Castilla, unprotected cruiser of 3,289 tons, with four 5.9-inch and two 4.7-inch guns. The vessel's 8-inch guns had been removed to equip the shore batteries. The ship was used as a floating battery as the temporary repair of the leaks had immobilized her propeller shaft.
- Don Antonio de Ulloa, unprotected cruiser of 1,152 tons, with two 4.7-inch guns on the starboard side. Under repair with her engines ashore. Her entire port side armament had been removed to equip the shore batteries.
- Don Juan de Austria, unprotected cruiser of 1,152 tons, with four 4.7-inch guns. Top speed 13 knots.
- Isla de Cuba, protected cruiser of 1,030 tons, with six 4.7-inch guns. Top speed 14 knots.
- Isla de Luzon, protected cruiser of 1,030 tons, with six 4.7-inch guns. Top speed 14 knots.
- Marques del Duero, gunboat of 492 tons, with one 6.4-inch and two 4.7-inch guns. Top speed 10 knots.

Unengaged vessels:

- Mindanao, transport ship of 1,900 tons, with 2 secondary rapid fire guns. 77 men.
- Velasco, unprotected cruiser of 1,152 tons. Her boilers were ashore being repaired. All her guns were apparently removed to the Caballo Island Battery. 145 men.
- El Coreo, gunboat of 560 tons, with three 4.7-inch guns, three secondary rapid-fire guns, and 1 torpedo tube. 115 men.
- General Lezo, gunboat of 520 tons, with two 4.7-inch guns which were apparently removed to El Fraile Island, 2 secondary rapid-fire guns, and 1 torpedo tube. 115 men.
- Argos, gunboat of 508 tons, with one 3.5-inch gun. 87 men.

The Spanish vessels had 19 torpedo tubes between them but no serviceable torpedoes.

Shore defenses

- Fort San Antonio Abad: Built 1584. Located in Manila. Various guns with only the 9.4-inch having enough range to reach Dewey's ships at their closest approach.
- Fort San Felipe: Built 1609. A small castle built on a sandbar protected by a breakwater and separated from Cavite City by a moat.
- Cavite Fort: Fortified naval base and shipyard in Cavite City located adjacent to Fort San Felipe.
- Corregidor battery: Entrance to Manila Bay. Did not fire.
- Caballo battery: Entrance to Manila Bay. Did not fire.
- El Fraile battery: Entrance to Manila Bay. Fired three rounds before Raleigh silenced it after hitting the battery with a single shell.
- Cañacao battery: Located in the town of Cañacao. Armed with a single 4.7-inch gun. Did not fire.
- Sangley Point battery: Located at the Sangley Point Naval Base. Armed with three 64-lb muzzleloading cannon and two 5.9-inch guns (which were the only ones to fire.)
- Malate battery: Located in the Manila district of Malate. Did not fire.

The batteries were supplemented with the guns removed from Montojo's fleet. The Corregidor, Caballo and El Fraile batteries had a combined total of 17 guns.

== Gallery ==
The United States Navy ships:

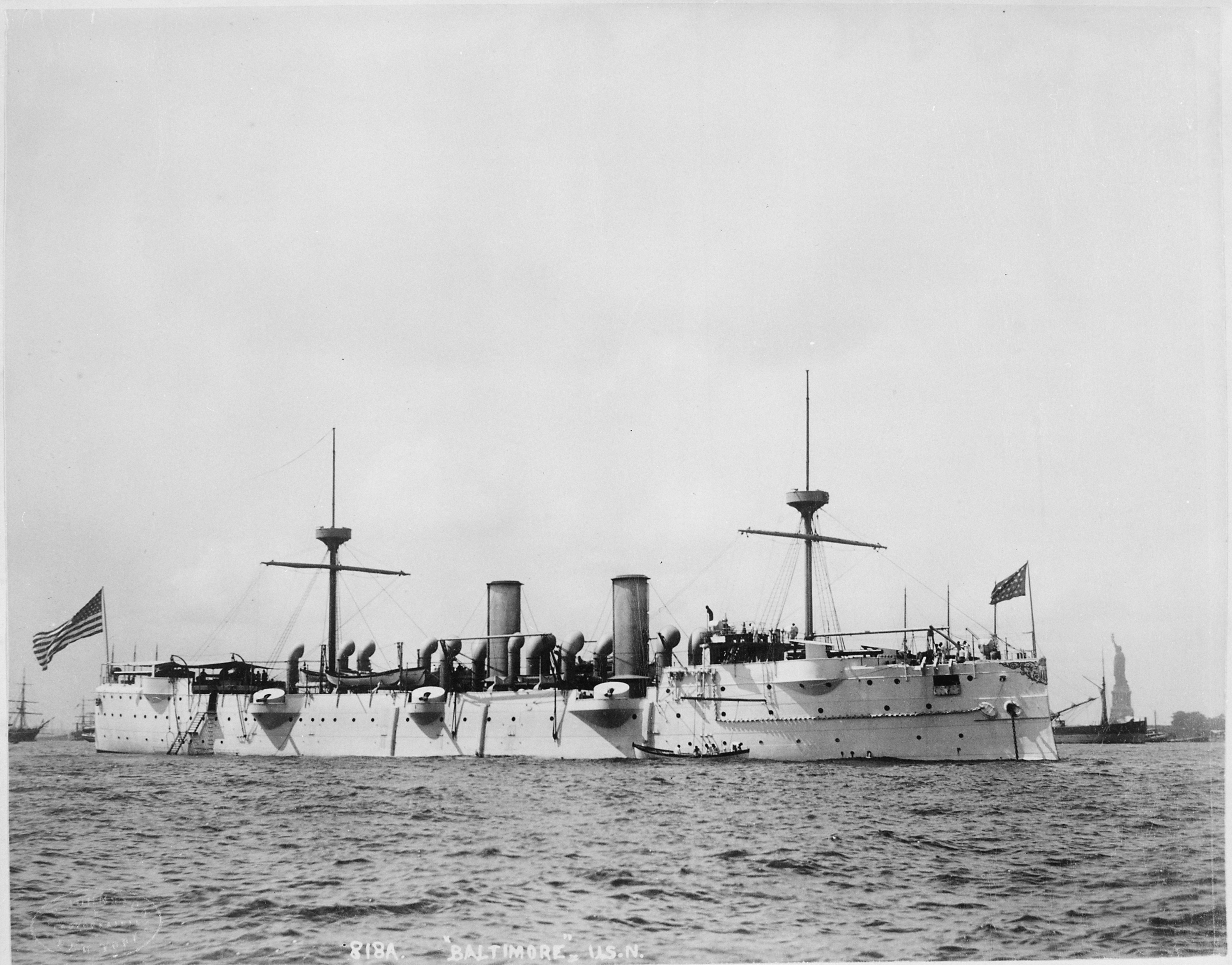
USS Baltimore, 1891

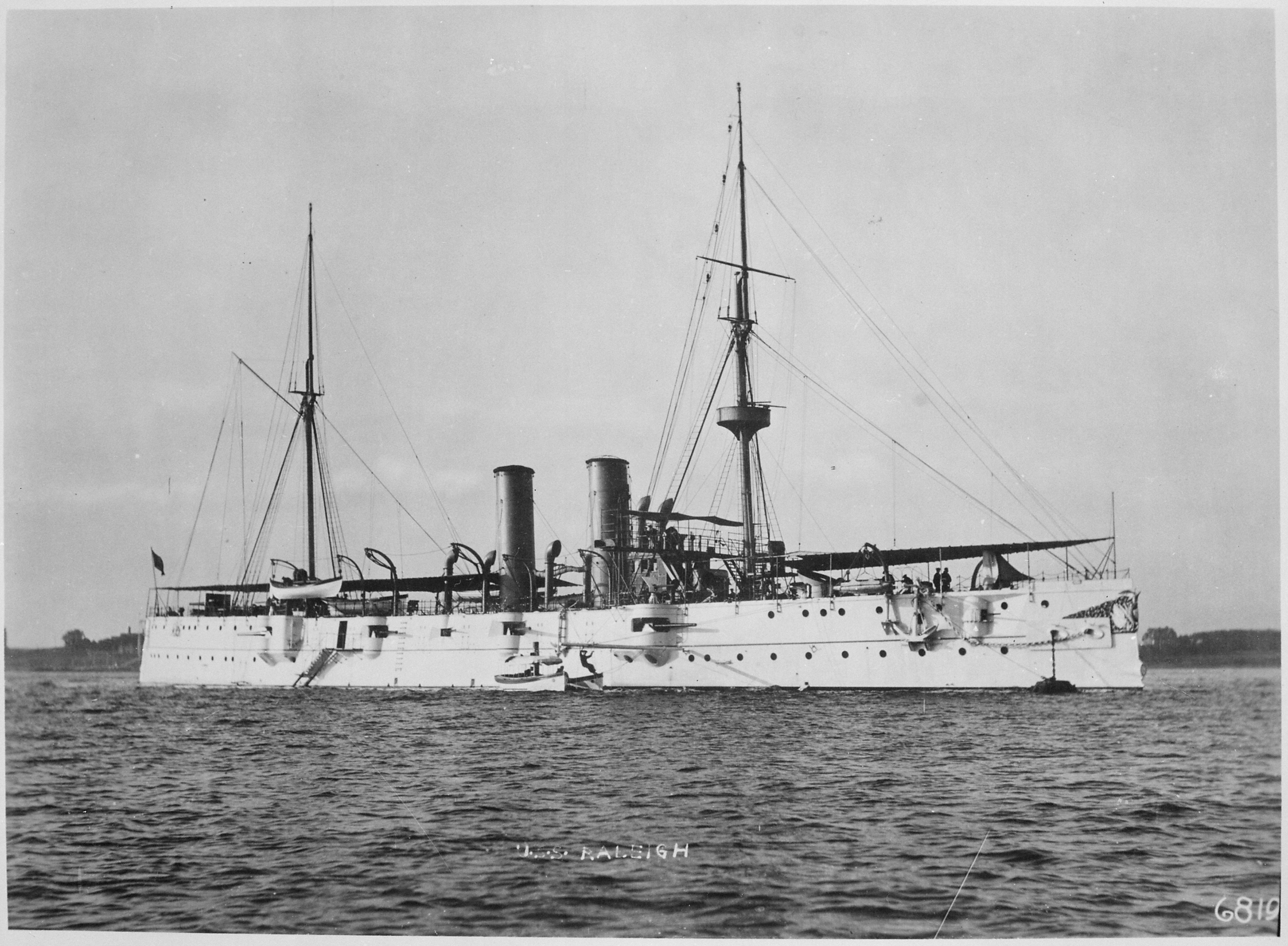
USS Raleigh, 1900

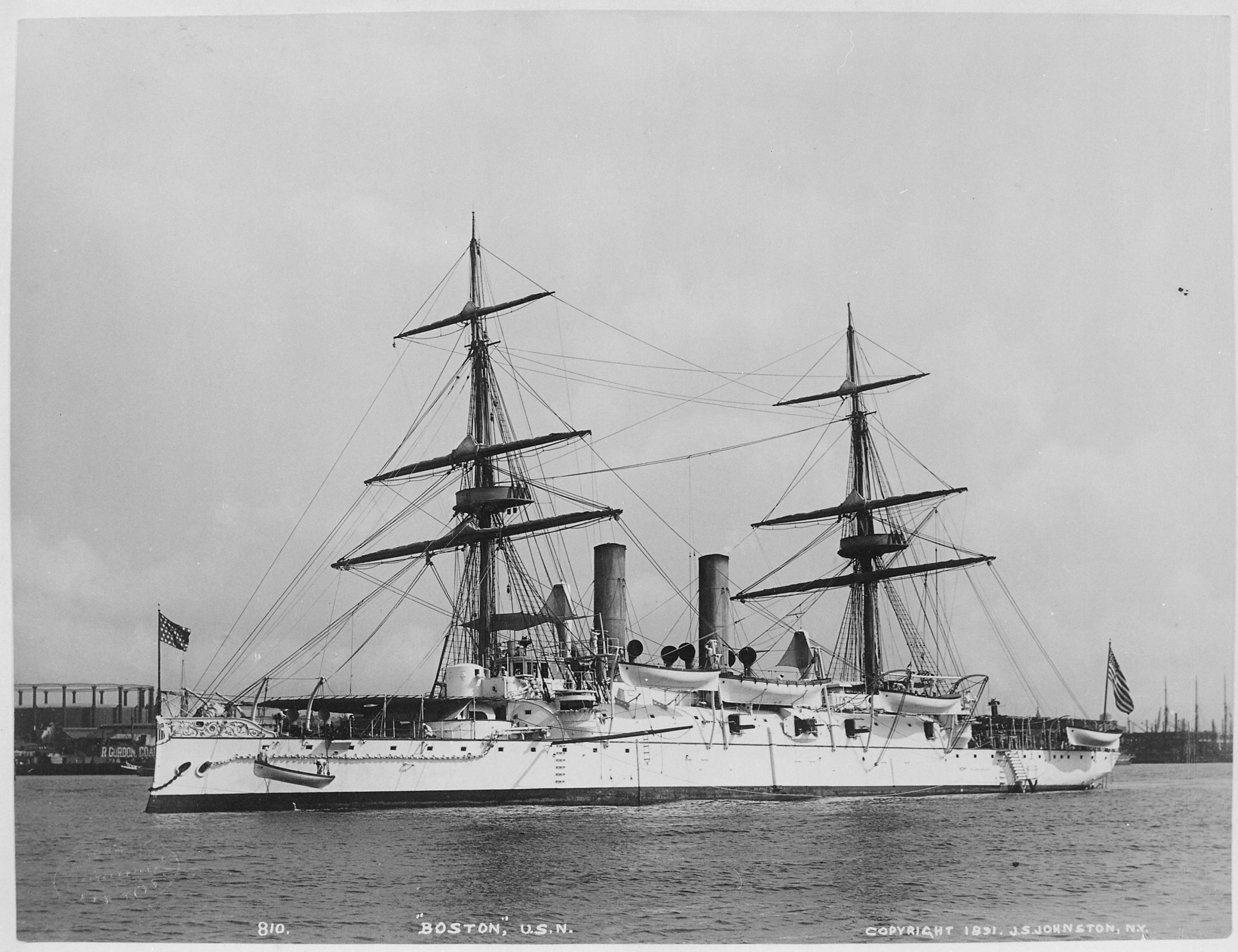
USS Boston, 1891

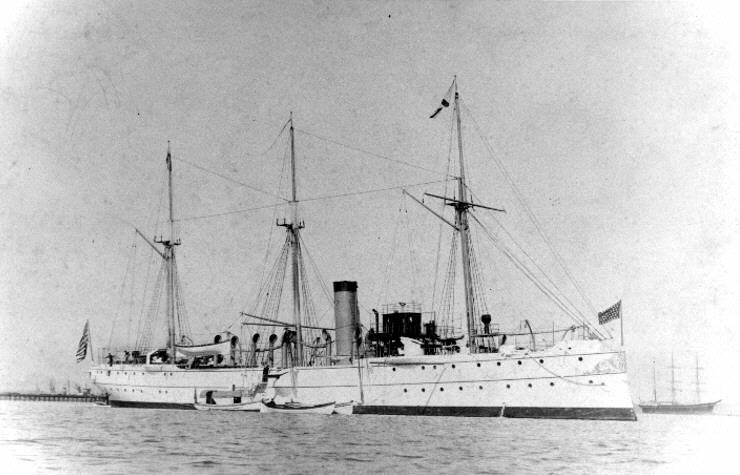
USS Concord, circa 1890s

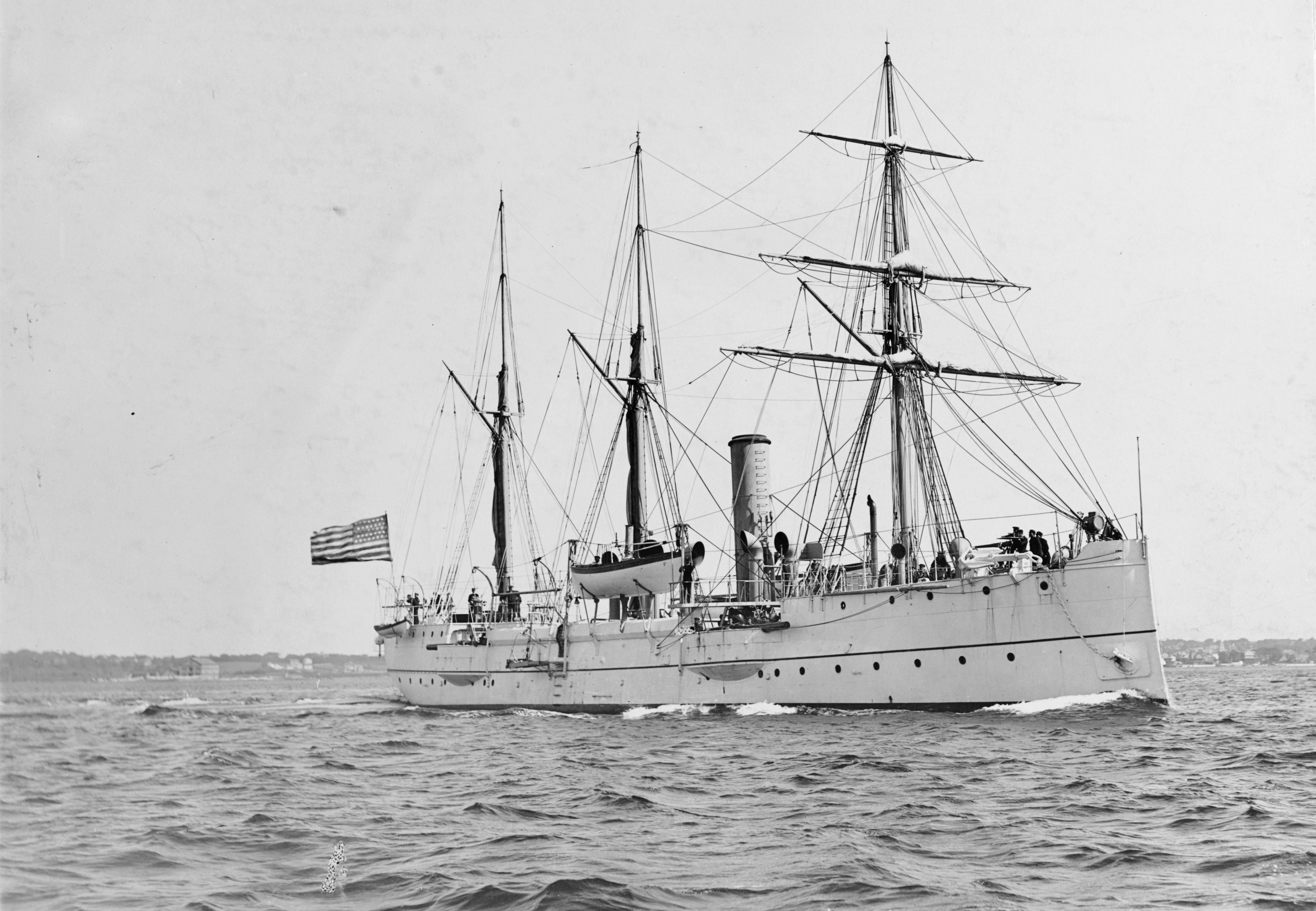
USS Petrel

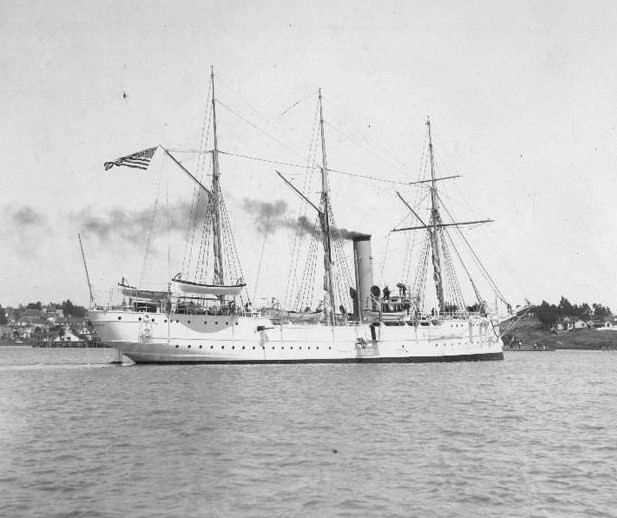
USRC McCulloch, circa 1900

The destroyed Spanish ships after the battle:

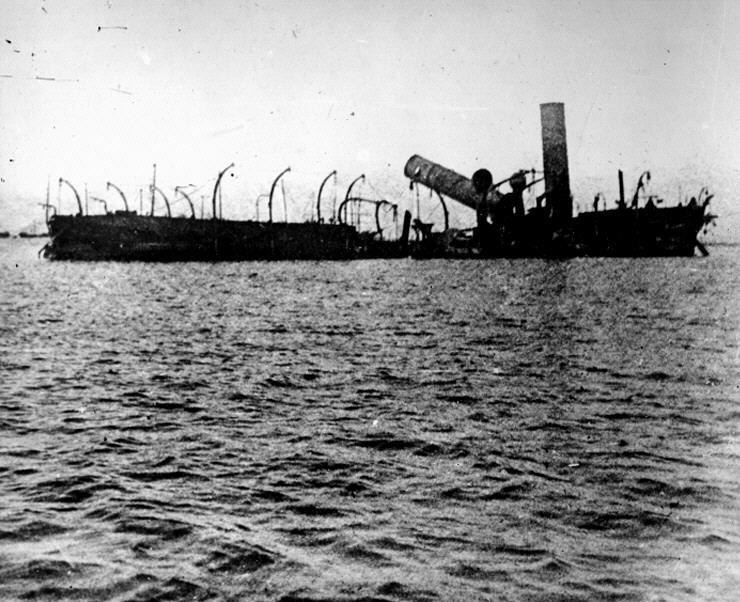
Wreck of the Reina Cristina

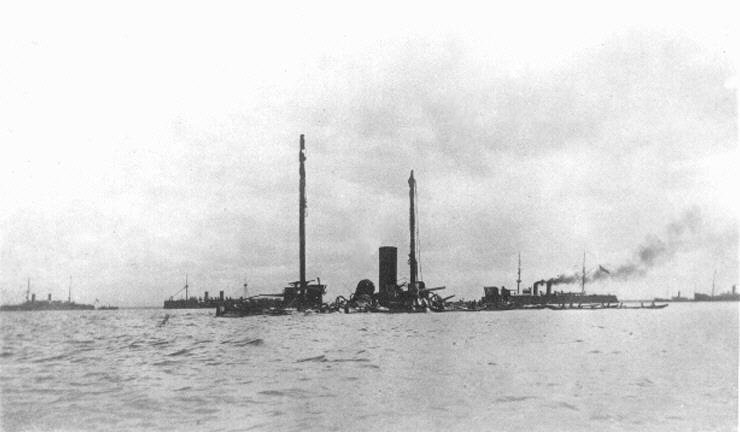
Wreck of the Castilla

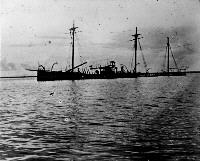
Wreck of the Don Antonio de Ulloa

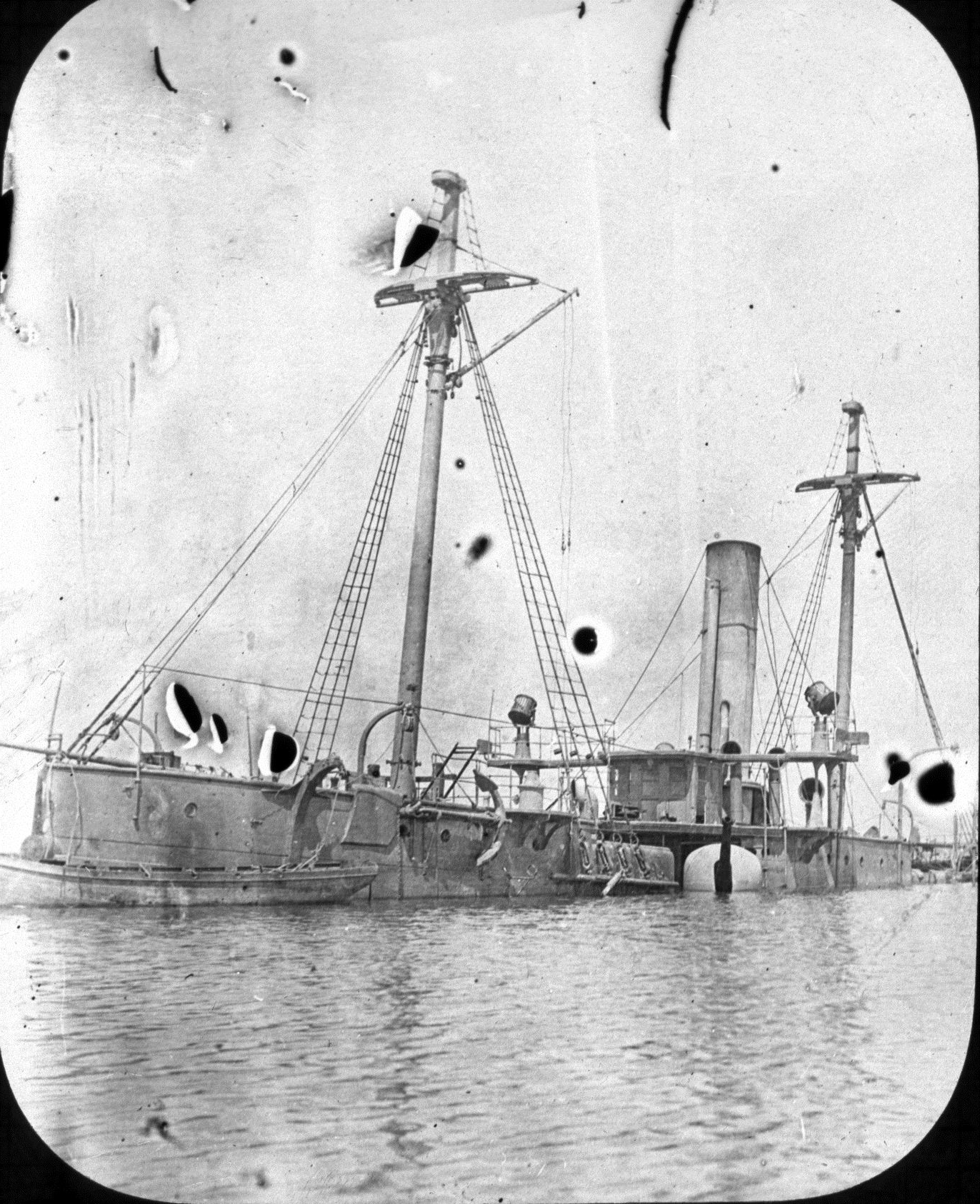
Wreck of the Isla de Cuba

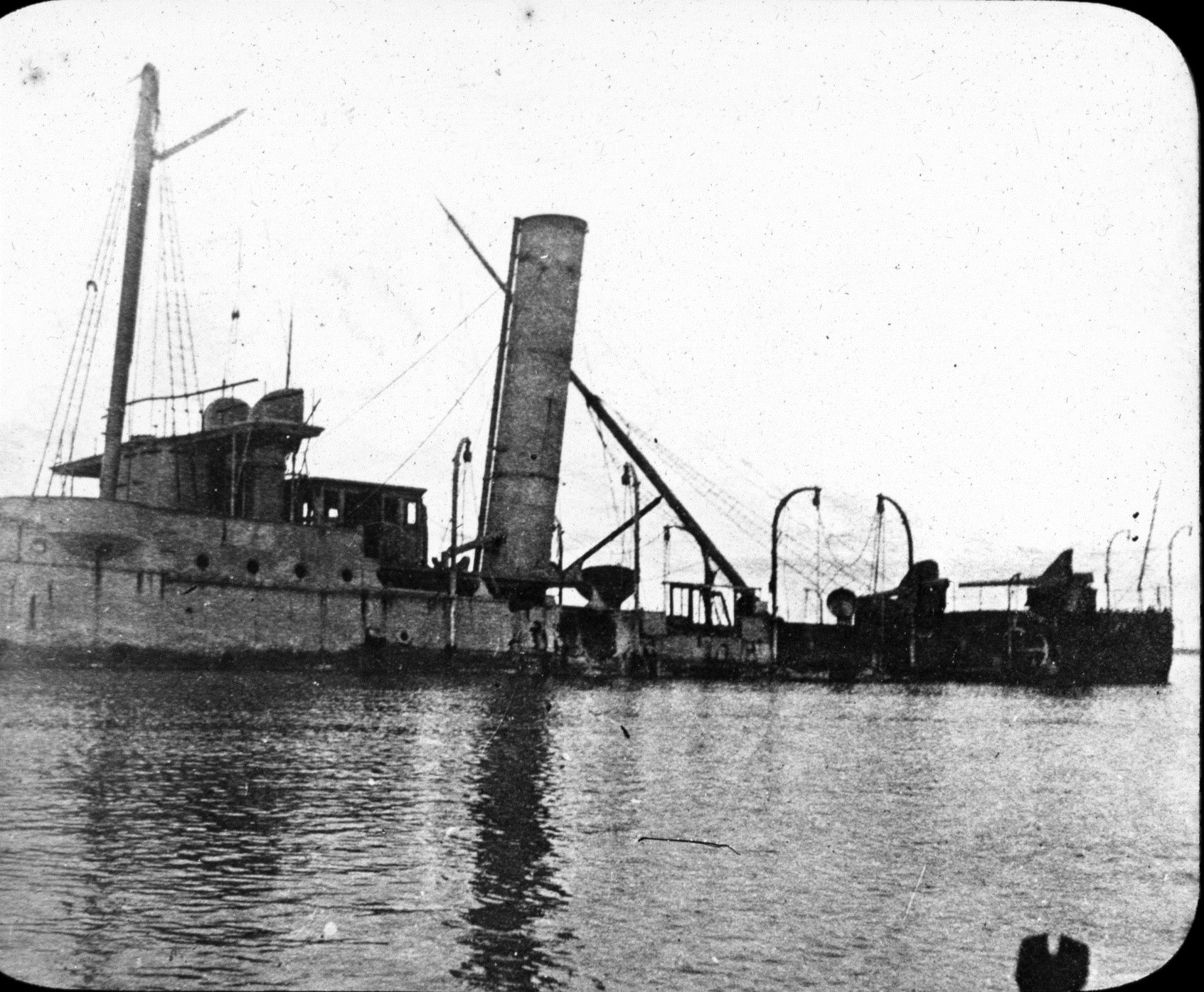
Wreck of the Isla de Luzon

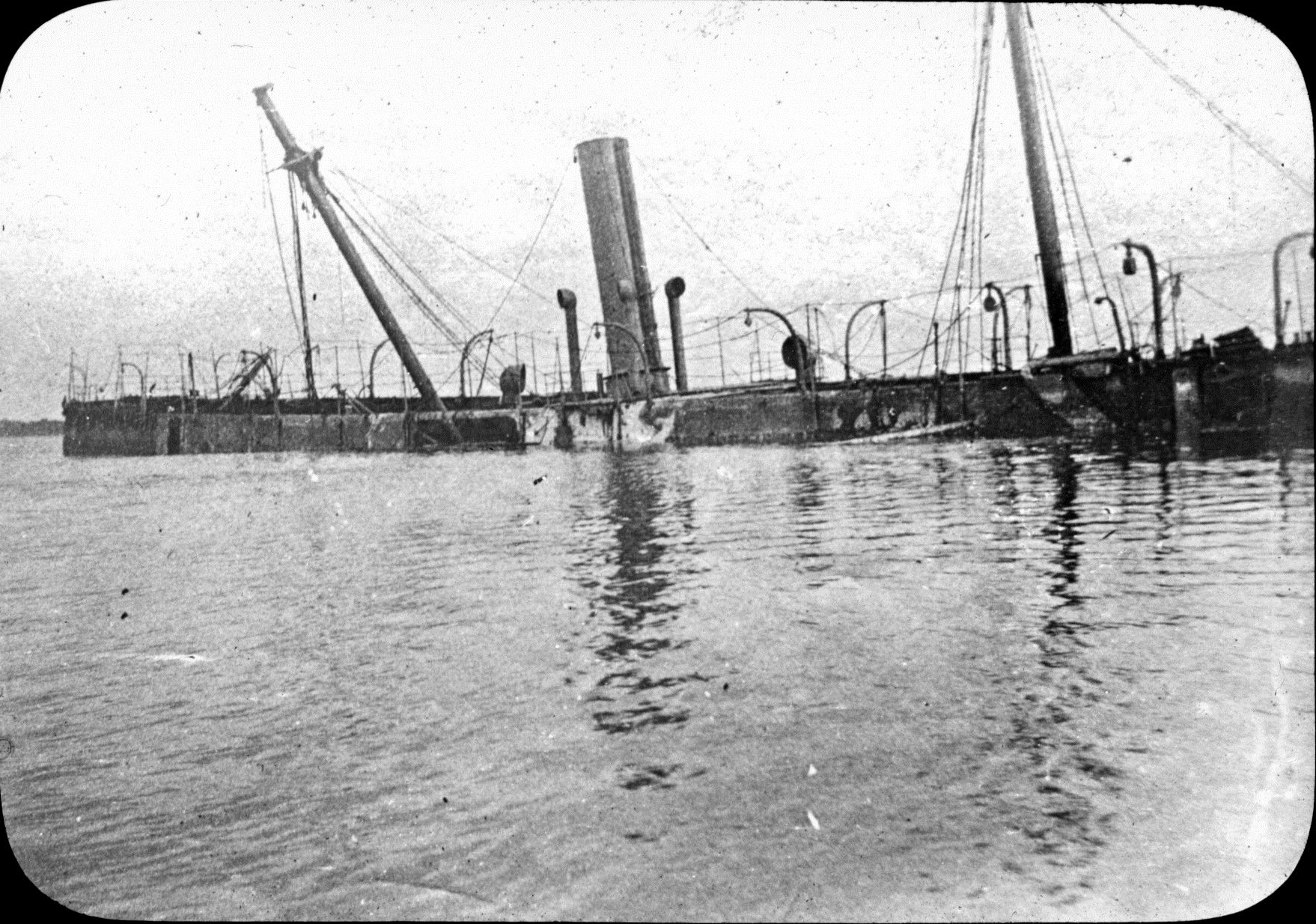
Wreck of the Velasco

== See also ==
- Battle of Manila (disambiguation)
- Battles of the Spanish–American War
- Philippine–American War
- List of naval battles

== Additional references ==
- Nofi, Albert A., The Spanish American War, 1898, 1997.
- Carrasco García, Antonio, En Guerra con Los Estados Unidos: Cuba, 1898, Madrid: 1998.
- Freidel, Frank Burt. The Splendid Little War. Boston: Little, Brown, 1958.
- Blow, Michael. A Ship to Remember: The Maine and the Spanish–American War. New York : Morrow, 1992. ISBN 0-688-09714-6.
- Saravia, José Roca de Togores y; Garcia, Remigio (2003), Blockade and Siege of Manila in 1898, National Historical Institute, ISBN 978-971-538-167-3
