= USS Zafiro =

Collier of the United States Navy

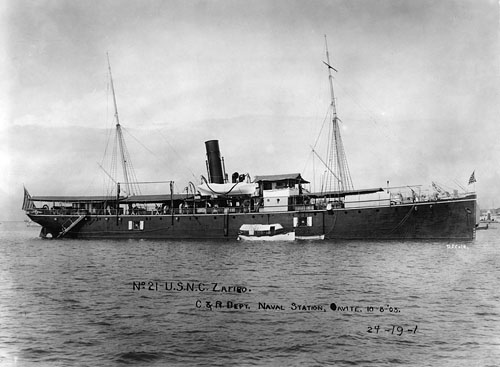
- USNC Zafiro

History

United States
- Name: USS Zafiro
- Namesake: Previous name retained
- Builder: Hall, Russell & Company, Aberdeen, Scotland, United Kingdom
- Completed: 1884
- Acquired: 9 April 1898
- Commissioned: 10 April 1898 (officially, but see article text)
- Decommissioned: 10 June 1904
- Stricken: 16 January 1906
- Fate: Sold 21 October 1910
- Notes: Operated as commercial collier 1884–1898

General characteristics
- Type: Collier
- Tonnage: 1,062 long tons (1,079 t) gross
- Length: 213 ft 8.5 in (65.138 m)
- Beam: 31 ft 9.5 in (9.690 m)
- Draft: 15 ft 6 in (4.72 m)
- Speed: 10.5 kn (12.1 mph; 19.4 km/h)
- Complement: 1898: 1 when commissioned (officially; see article text); 1900: 45
- Armament: 1900: 2 × 37 mm (1.5 in) revolving cannons

USS Zafiro was a collier, a bulk cargo ship, that served in the United States Navy from 1898 until 1904. She executed the first known cut of a submarine cable.

== History ==
Zafiro was constructed in 1884 in the United Kingdom by Hall, Russell & Company in Aberdeen, Scotland. Admiral George Dewey purchased her for the U.S. Navy in Hong Kong, China, on 9 April 1898, just before his Asiatic Squadron sailed for the Philippine Islands at the beginning of the Spanish–American War.

Though the Secretary of the Navy's Report for 1900 indicates that Zafiro was placed in commission on 10 April 1898, her role as a commissioned ship must have been unique indeed, for her complement showed only one U.S. Navy man, her commanding officer, aboard. At the time of the battle, she was commanded by Ensign Henry A. Pearson, USN, but retained her civilian crew. Despite orders to the contrary, Dewey did not commission Zafiro into the U.S. Navy, so she would technically be a merchant ship and, thus, would be able to access neutral ports, which greatly simplified the squadron's logistics.

Her status in the Navy from 1898 to 1900 is further complicated by the fact that there are no deck logs extant for her during the period; her first log begins on 20 September 1900. Finally, after her service in the Spanish–American War, which ended in August 1898, she had no naval complement on board until Ensign L. A. Gotten reported on board to assume command on 10 May 1900. Thus, the date upon which she was placed in commission cannot be established with any precision.

Nevertheless USS Zafiro executed the first known cut of underwater cables in 1898. During the Spanish-American war she cut the communication-cable in the Gulf of Manila connecting Manila to the Asian continent to isolate the Philippines from the rest of the world, as well as the cable connecting Manila to the Philippine city of Capiz and Capiz province.

Zafiro departed Hong Kong with Dewey's squadron in April 1898 and served with it as a collier and supply ship during the Battle of Manila Bay and the ensuing Philippine campaign. The lack of documents covering her activities in 1898 and the first half of 1899 precludes any detailed narrative for that period. Presumably, she plied the waters of the Philippine Islands, carrying troops, supplies, and dispatches between points in the archipelago. Based in Cavite, Luzon, she is known to have performed such missions during the period from July 1899 to June 1904. Those movements—in support of the United States Army's suppression of the Philippine insurrection and campaigns against the Moslem Moro tribesmen—took her to a host of exotic places and the length and breadth of the islands.

On 10 June 1904, Zafiro was placed out of commission at Cavite. Her name was struck from the Navy List on 15 January 1906, and on 21 October 1910, she was sold to Mr. J. W. Zeeve of Seattle, Washington.

== Cable cutting ==
USS Zafiro executed the first historical known cut of subsea cables in 1898. The first attacks occurred in the Philippines, as Commodore George Dewey prepared for his extended stay in Manila Bay. When the Spanish governor-general refused to grant Dewey the use of the submarine cable from the Philippine capital Manila to Hong Kong, Dewey ordered the USS Zafiro to find and sever the cable. As part of the Spanish-American war she cuted in the Gulf of Manila the communication-cable connecting Manila to the Asian continent to isolate the Philippines from the rest of the world, as well as the cable connecting Manila to the Philippine city of Capiz and Capiz province.

== Later service ==
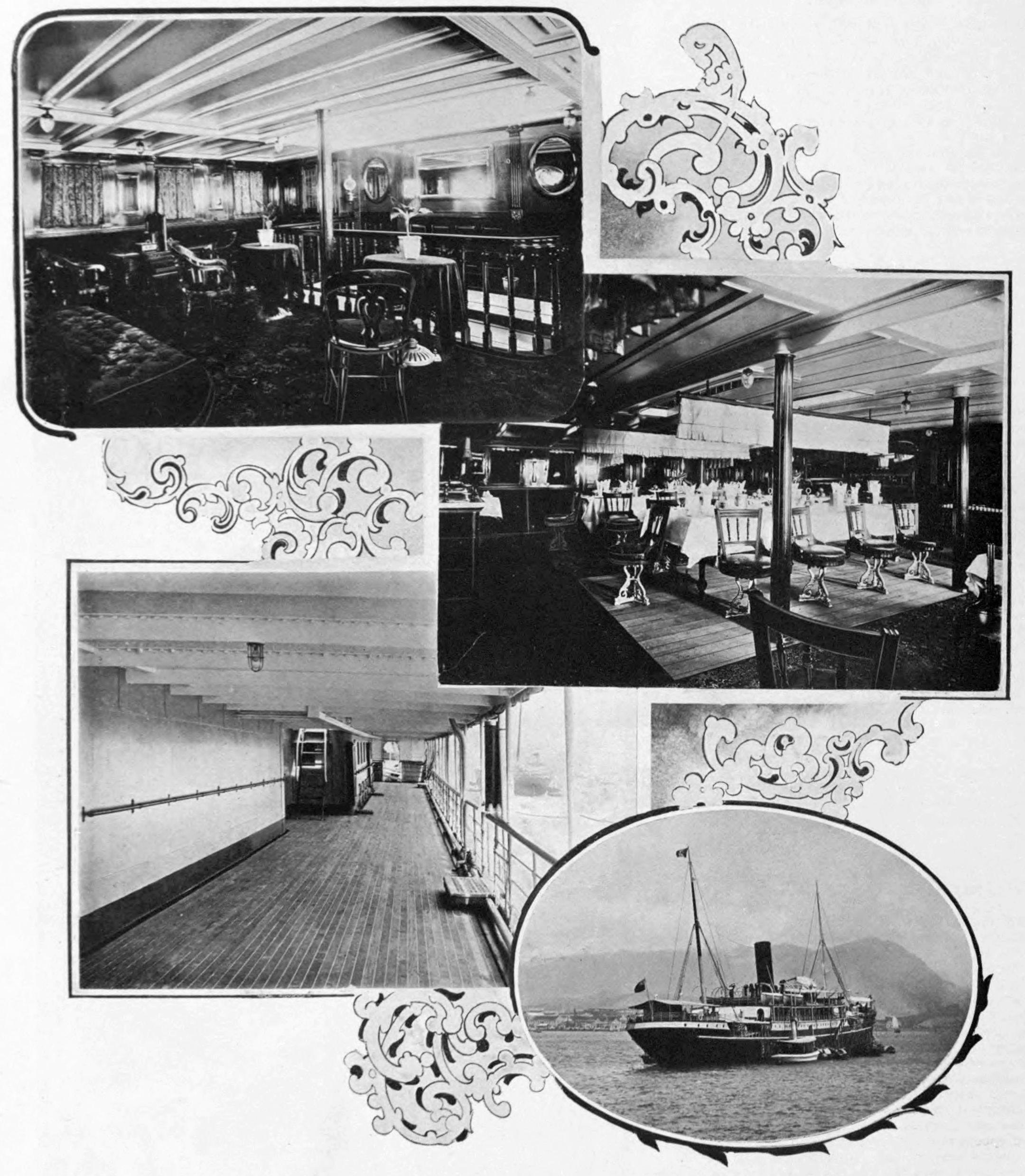
SS Zafiro in Hong Kong showing interior

Soon afterwards, on 20 October 1910, Zeeve sold her to the Government of Mexico. In 1917, the vessel reappeared as the French-owned sailing vessel Bowler in a British Columbia shipyard, and refitted with wood planking. As such, this change made it hard for the owner to getting a marine rating from Bureau Veritas or Lloyd's of London, and – in 1918 – it was suggested that she be re-rigged into a coastal vessel.

On 20 August 1919, she was re-registered in Panama as the Belen Quezada, the first international "flag of convenience" vessel, to run alcohol between Canada and the United States during Prohibition.

The vessel was deleted from the Panamanian ship registry in 1931 and, presumably, scrapped shortly after.
