= SS Rosario di Giorgio =

Coordinates: 18°02′10″N 76°16′18″W

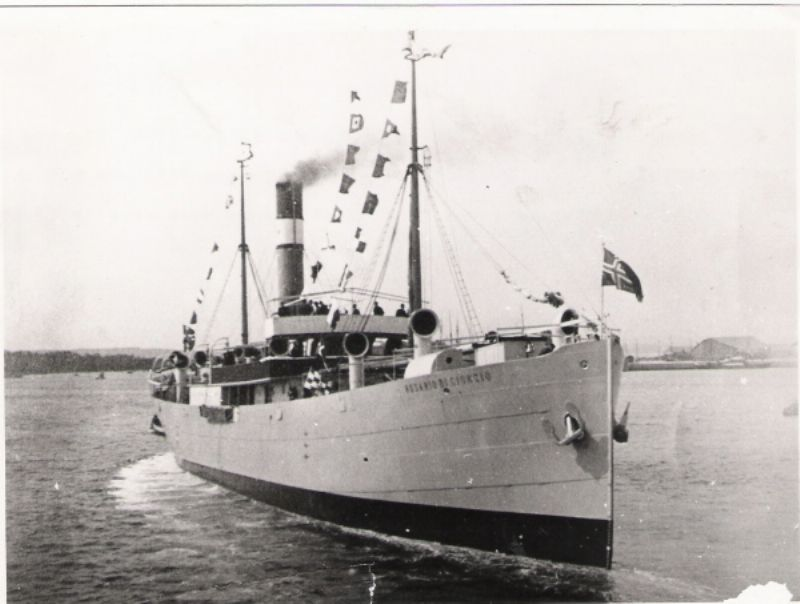

History

Norway
- Name: Rosario di Giorgio
- Namesake: Rosario di Giorgio
- Owner: Bernhard Hanssen
- Operator: D/S A/S "Avance"
- Builder: Nylands Verksted, Kristiania
- Yard number: 173
- Launched: 6 April 1907
- Completed: 11 May 1907
- Commissioned: 14 May 1907
- Home port: Flekkefjord
- Identification: Call sign MDKC
- Fate: Wrecked, 25 January 1911

General characteristics
- Type: Cargo ship
- Tonnage: 1,037 GRT; 608 NRT; 1,135 DWT
- Length: 215 ft 9 in (65.76 m)
- Beam: 30 ft 3 in (9.22 m)
- Depth: 20 ft 2 in (6.15 m)
- Installed power: 132 Nhp
- Propulsion: Nylands Verksted 3-cylinder triple expansion
- Speed: 12.0 knots

Rosario di Giorgio was a steam cargo ship built in 1907 by the Nylands Verksted of Kristiania for Bernhard Hanssen of Flekkefjord. The ship was primarily employed as a fruit carrier during her career. She was named after Rosario di Giorgio, manager of Baltimore branch of Atlantic Fruit Company, and brother of Joseph di Giorgio, founder of the company.

== Design and construction ==
Rosario di Giorgio was laid down at Nylands Verksted shipyard in Kristiania and launched on 6 April 1907 (yard number 173). After successful completion of sea trials on 14 May, during which the vessel was able to reach the speed of 14.0 miles per hour (12.2 kn; 22.5 km/h), Rosario di Giorgio was handed over to her owners. In addition to cargo the ship was also fitted to carry 12 first-class passengers. To operate the vessel, she was transferred to a separate company, Dampskibsaktieselskabet "Avance", owned by Bernhard Hanssen.

As built, the ship was 215 feet 9 inches (65.76 m) long (between perpendiculars) and 30 feet 3 inches (9.22 m) abeam, a mean draft of 20 feet 2 inches (6.15 m). Rosario di Giorgio was assessed at 1,037 GRT, 608 NRT and 1,135DWT. The vessel had a steel hull, and a single 132 nhp triple-expansion steam engine, with cylinders of 18-inch (46 cm), 29-inch (74 cm), and 48-inch (120 cm) diameter with a 33-inch (84 cm) stroke, that drove a single screw propeller, and moved the ship at up to 12.0 knots (13.8 mph; 22.2 km/h).

== Operational history ==
After delivery Rosario di Giorgio was immediately chartered to the Atlantic Fruit Company, controlled by di Giorgio family, to transport fruit from West Indies to North American ports. The ship left on 14 May 1907 for Cuba via Tyne in ballast and with 22 passengers, 13 of which were bound for Cuba. The ship arrived at Baracoa on 4 June and then proceeded to Port Antonio arriving there 2 days later. Upon loading the ship sailed for Baltimore where she arrived on 24 June with a cargo of 19,689 bunches of bananas and 3 passengers. After unloading Rosario di Giorgio sailed back to Port Antonio on 26 June and returned to New York on 11 July. The ship would continue her fruit trade between Baracoa, Port Antonio, Manchioneal and other Jamaican ports and New York, Philadelphia and Baltimore for the remainder of her career. On her return journeys she was either travelling in ballast, or carried general cargo, mostly food supplies. For example, on 28 January 1908 the ship brought in 14,958 bunches of bananas and 10 bags of coconuts to Baltimore, and loaded 120 barrels of flour for her return trip to Port Antonio.

On 4 November 1909 Rosario di Giorgio sailed from Philadelphia for Port Antonio on her regular trip. She arrived near the Jamaican northern shores on 13 November, right after the hurricane exited Jamaica, leaving behind widespread flooding and devastation. Several ships were wrecked or went aground during the storm, including German steamer SS Bradford, who on 7 November, while attempting to avoid the storm tried to enter Port Antonio but went aground on Hospital reef at the entrance of the harbor. When Rosario di Giorgio tried to enter the harbor on 13 November, she tried to steer clear of SS Bradford but still went aground a few feet ahead from the German ship. The vessel was finally refloated on 15 December and after quick repairs sailed for New York. The vessel returned to service in early March 1910.

During one of her return trips from Jamaica, Rosario di Giorgio collided with a US Navy collier Marcellus around 02:30 on 9 August 1910 about 60 miles off Cape Hatteras in misty weather. Marcellus and another collier Leonidas were on their way to Guantanamo each towing two coal-laden barges. The collision was so strong that Marcellus had her bow practically cut off. Rosario di Giorgio stood by the damaged collier for about five hours before being told her help was no longer needed. Marcellus finally drowned at about 12:55. Rosario di Giorgio arrived in New York the next day with her bow smashed and twisted and was put into drydock for repairs immediately after discharging her cargo. There were no casualties in the accident, and the crew of Marcellus was safely landed at Hampton Roads by Leonidas. The subsequent naval inquiry into the accident found Rosario di Giorgio solely at fault for the collision, and entered a claim against her for $125,000.

After undergoing repairs the ship returned to service in early September 1910, departing New York for Port Antonio on 6 September and resumed her trade service between East coast ports and Jamaica.

On her last trip the vessel departed from Baltimore on 18 January 1911 for Port Antonio and other Jamaican ports and arrived off Manchioneal in the afternoon of 25 January. As she was entering the harbor, the ship went aground and got stranded on the reef on the northern side of the entrance to Manchioneal Harbor, on the east coast of Jamaica. Due to impact the boilers got displaced and her hull was penetrated by coral rocks causing quick flooding of the engine room. A wrecking steamer was sent to her aid but bad weather prevented any attempts to salvage the ship until mid-February. Finally, an attempt was made to refloat Rosario di Giorgio on 11 February but the ship soon started drifting broadside on the reefs, and on 14 February 1911 it was decided to abandon her.
