= Spanish gunboat Marques del Duero =

Naval gun boat

History

Spain
- Name: Marques del Duero
- Namesake: The Marquis of Douro
- Builder: La Seyne, France
- Laid down: 20 January 1875
- Launched: 3 May 1875
- Completed: 1875
- Commissioned: 1875
- Fate: Sunk 1 May 1898; captured and salvaged by U.S. Navy.

General characteristics
- Class & type: Fernando el Catolico-class aviso or first-class gunboat; reclassified third-class gunboat in 1895
- Displacement: 492 tons
- Length: 157 ft 5 in (47.98 m)
- Beam: 23 ft 6 in (7.16 m)
- Draft: 10 ft 10 in (3.30 m)maximum
- Installed power: 550 ihp (410 kW)
- Propulsion: 2 shafts
- Sail plan: Schooner-rigged
- Speed: 10 knots (19 km/h; 12 mph)
- Complement: 98 officers and enlisted
- Armament: 1 × 6.4 in (160 mm) rifled muzzle-loading gun; 2 × 4.7 in (120 mm) smoothbore guns; 1 × machine gun
- Notes: 89 tons of coal (normal)

Marques del Duero was a Fernando el Catolico-class gunboat of the Spanish Navy which fought in the Battle of Manila Bay during the Spanish–American War.

== Technical characteristics ==
Marques del Duero was a first-class gunboat, or "aviso", built by La Seyne in France. She was laid down on 20 January 1875, launched on 3 May 1875, and completed the same year. She was designed to fight against the Carlists in the Mediterranean and the Bay of Biscay during the Third Carlist War, patrolling off Carlist ports to intercept contraband and blockade the ports, and also providing despatch services between Spanish Navy forces operating off various ports, hence her Spanish designation of aviso, meaning "warning." She had an iron hull with a very prominent ram bow, was coal-fired, was rigged as a schooner, and could carry 89 tons of coal. She was reclassified as a third-class gunboat in 1895.

== Operational history ==
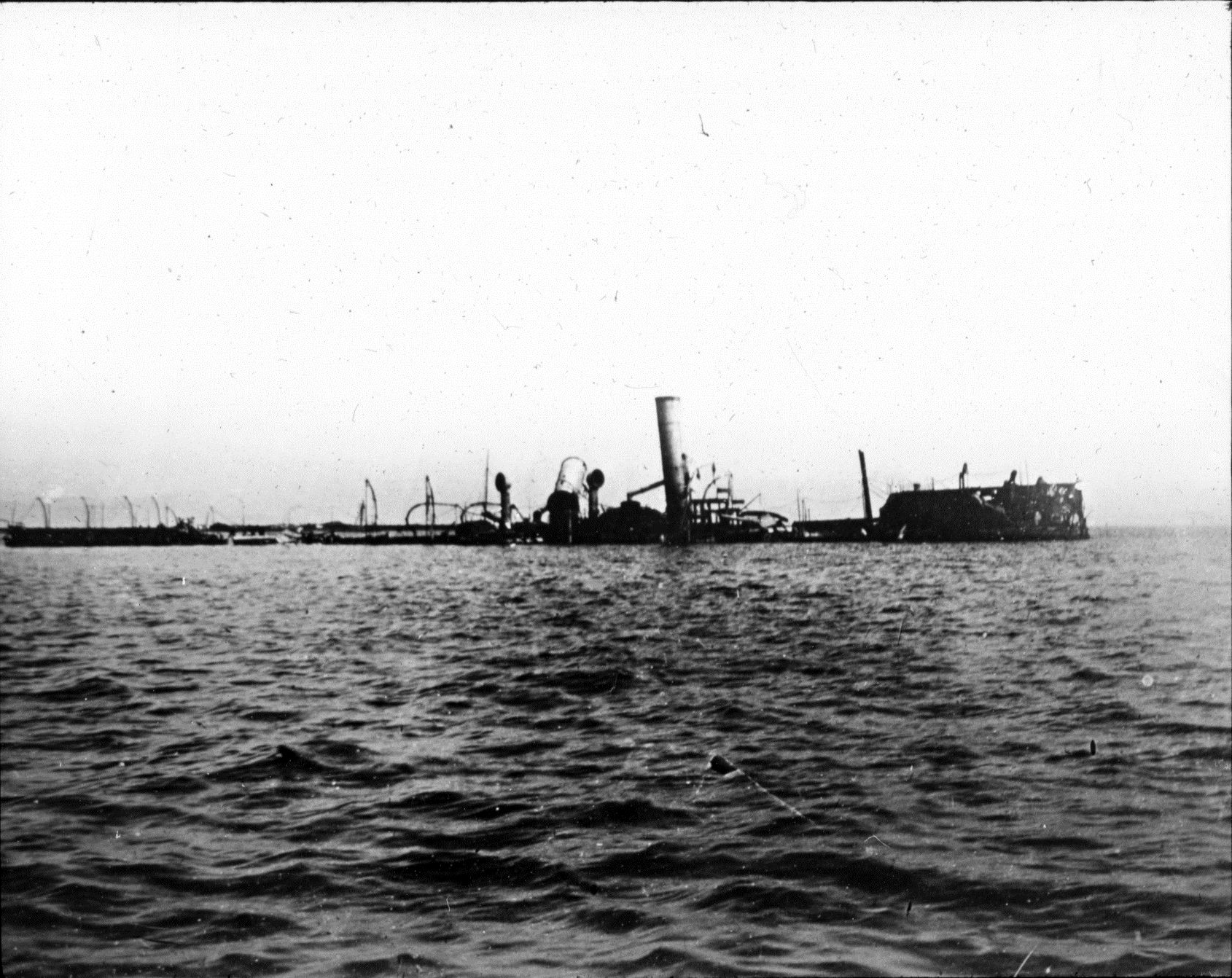
Wreck

The Spanish took delivery of Marques del Duero from her French builders at Marseille, France. She set out on her first operational deployment from Marseille on 27 July 1875, heading for San Sebastián Bay in northern Spain for blockade, patrol, and despatch duty. She served there beyond the end of the Third Carlist War on 27 February 1876, finally leaving after Spanish naval forces there began to leave for postwar duties after 5 April 1876.

On 29 July 1876, Marques del Duero departed Spain for the Philippines, where she was based at Zamboanga, assigned to the South Division of the Asiatic Squadron.

On 24 July 1880, Marques del Duero left Philippine waters for courtesy visits to the kings of Siam and Annam at Saigon and Singapore.

On 27 September 1895, Marques del Duero captured several pirate launches manned by Moros in Borneo. She later attacked a group of Moro and Tagalog pirates, killing 18 and wounding 30.

Marques del Duero was the oldest member of Rear Admiral Patricio Montojo de Pasaron's Pacific Squadron at Manila in the Philippine Islands when the Spanish–American War broke out in April 1898. She was anchored with the squadron in Cañacao Bay under the lee of the Cavite Peninsula east of Sangley Point, Luzon, eight miles southwest of Manila, when, early on the morning of 1 May 1898, the United States Navy's Asiatic Squadron under Commodore George Dewey, found Montojo's anchorage and attacked. In the resulting Battle of Manila Bay, the first major engagement of the Spanish–American War, Marques del Duero took one 8-inch (203 mm), one 6-inch (152 mm), and about three other shell hits, which wrecked her bow gun, a side gun, and an engine. Her crew scuttled her in shallow water; part of her upper works remained above water, and a boarding crew from the gunboat USS Petrel went aboard and set these on fire at the end of battle.

After the war, a U.S. Navy salvage team raised and repaired Marques del Duero. She served briefly in the U.S. Navy as USS P-17, but was decommissioned and scrapped in 1900.
