= USS Nanshan =

Collier of the United States Navy

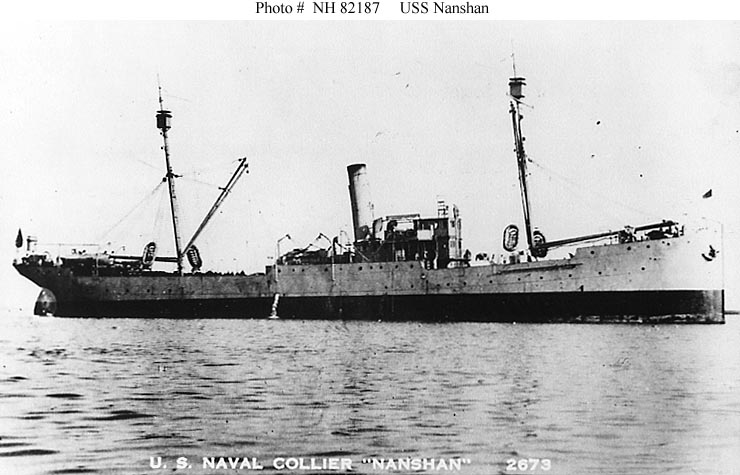

History

United States
- Name: USS Nanshan
- Builder: Grangemouth Dockyard Company, Grangemouth, Scotland
- Launched: 1896
- Acquired: 1898
- Commissioned: 1 August 1914
- Decommissioned: 18 January 1922
- Fate: Sold, 29 July 1922

General characteristics
- Type: Collier
- Displacement: 5,059 long tons (5,140 t)
- Length: 295 ft 8 in (90.12 m)
- Beam: 39 ft (12 m)
- Draft: 21 ft 3 in (6.48 m)
- Speed: 11 kn (13 mph; 20 km/h)
- Complement: 45 officers and enlisted
- Armament: 1 × 6-pounder

USS Nanshan (AG-3) was a collier in the service of the United States Navy.

Nanshan was launched in 1896 by Grangemouth Dockyard Company, Grangemouth, Scotland for merchant service as a collier in the Far East; purchased at Hong Kong on 6 April 1898 from Frank Smythe; and placed in service the same day, Captain E. H. Stovell of the British Marine Service in command.

== Service history ==
Acquired by the Navy as a supply ship for Commodore George Dewey's Asiatic Squadron, Nanshan sailed from Hong Kong on 24 April 1898 with the squadron, remaining outside the harbor during the Battle of Manila Bay on 1 May. At the time of the battle, she was commanded by Lieutenant Benjamin W. Hodges, USN but retained her civilian crew. Despite orders to the contrary, Dewey did not commission Nanshan into the U.S. Navy so she would technically be a merchant ship and, thus, would be able to access neutral ports which greatly simplified the squadron's logistics.

She coaled Dewey's victorious ships until Manila was occupied on 13 August, and continued to serve in the Philippines and on the China Station. Aside from a brief period out of service at Cavite Navy Yard for upkeep from 29 March 1906 – 1 February 1907, Nanshan served in the Far East until 10 May 1913, when she returned to San Francisco to coal ships along the coasts of California, Mexico, and South America.

Placed out of service at Mare Island Naval Shipyard on 31 March 1914 for repairs, Nanshan was placed in full commission on 1 August with her first Navy crew. Supply missions ranging from Alaska to Hawaii continued until 1 February 1918, when she sailed for Hampton Roads, Virginia, via the Panama Canal.

This cargo trip ended with her return to Mare Island on 16 May when she resumed her usual operations, which included in July 1919 an emergency mission to Kodiak, Alaska and the Pribilof Islands bringing badly needed food. From 5 December 1919 – 3 December 1921, Nanshan served as a target repair ship. She decommissioned at Mare Island on 18 January 1922 and was sold on 29 July to John A. Bercovich Co.

In Chinese, "Nanshan" means "south mountain" and refers to a small group of mountains in Guangdong Province. The ship retained her former name in naval service.
