= Salvador Moreno Fernández =

Spanish admiral and politician (1886–1966)

Salvador Moreno
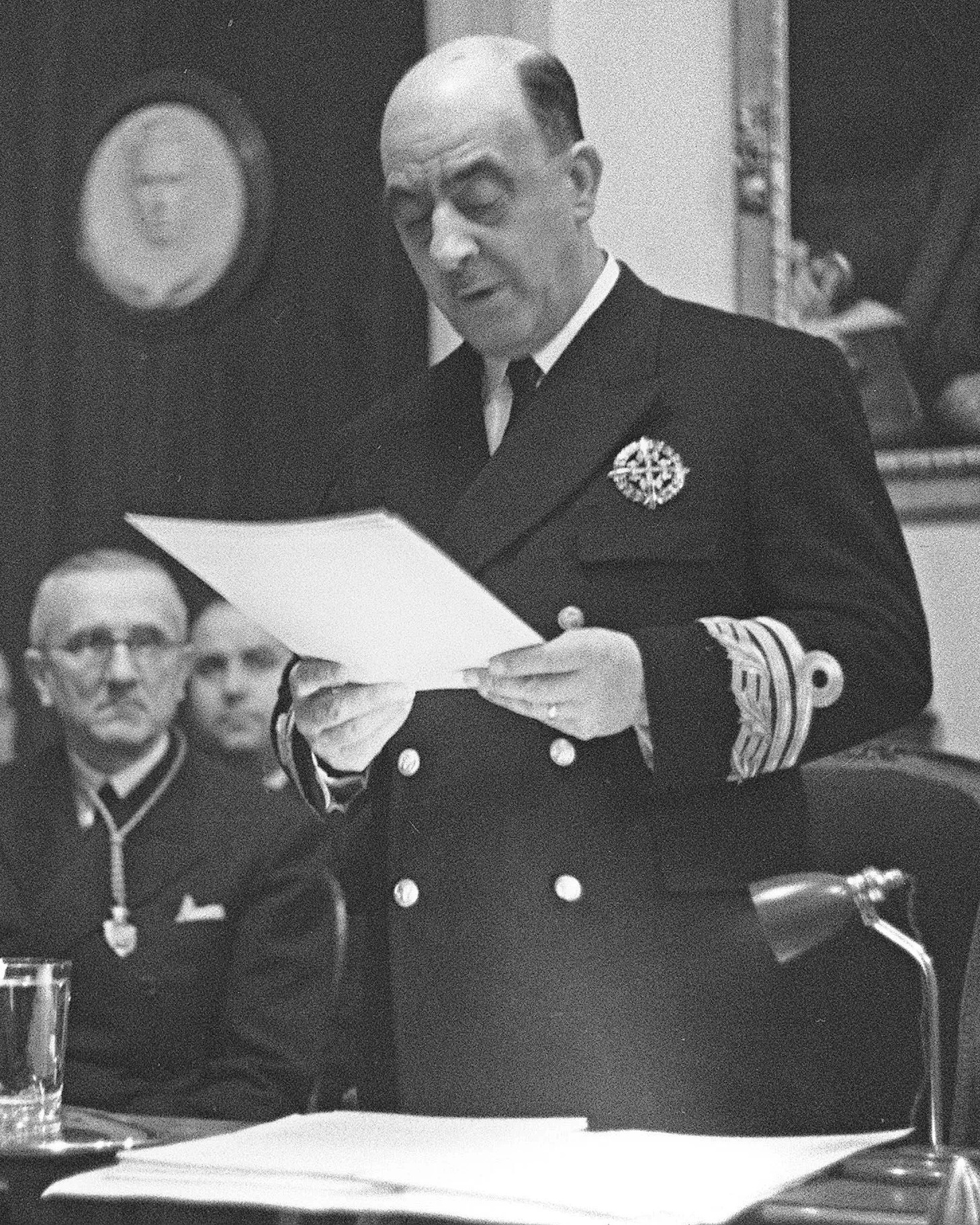
- Salvador Moreno Fernández during a conference in Buenos Aires, Argentina, in 1947.

Minister of the Navy of Spain
- In office 19 July 1951 – 25 February 1957
- Prime Minister: Francisco Franco
- Preceded by: Francisco Regalado
- Succeeded by: Felipe José Abárzuza
- In office 9 August 1939 – 20 July 1945
- Prime Minister: Francisco Franco
- Preceded by: Fidel Dávila Arrondo (National Defence)
- Succeeded by: Francisco Regalado

Personal details
- Born: Salvador Moreno Fernández; 14 October 1886 Ferrol, Galicia, Kingdom of Spain
- Died: 2 May 1966 (aged 79) Madrid, Spanish State
- Relatives: Francisco Moreno Fernández (brother)

Military service
- Allegiance: Kingdom of Spain (to 1931); Second Spanish Republic (1931–1936); Nationalist faction (1936—1939); Spanish State (from 1939)
- Branch/service: Spanish Armed Forces
- Years of service: 1903–1957 (?)
- Rank: Almirante (Admiral)
- Commands: No. 12; Janer Naval Gunnery Range; Ríos Naval Base; Villaamil; Juan Sebastián de Elcano; Almirante Cervera; Canarias; Northern Squadron; Captain General of Ferrol del Caudillo
- Battles/wars: Spanish Civil War; Siege of Gijón; Battle of Cape Spartel; Battle of Málaga; Málaga–Almería road massacre; Battle of Cape Machichaco

Salvador Moreno Fernández (14 October 1886 – 2 May 1966) was a Spanish Navy admiral who participated in the coup d'état in Spain in July 1936 against the Second Spanish Republic that triggered the Spanish Civil War (1936–1939). He fought on the Nationalist side during the war, in which the light cruiser Almirante Cervera under his command took part in the Málaga–Almería road massacre. After the war he held several positions during the Franco dictatorship, including service as Minister of the Navy from 1939 to 1945 and from 1951 to 1957. Posthumously, he has been stripped of some of his honors because of his support for the Francoist dictatorship and accused of war crimes.

== Biography ==
=== Early life ===
Moreno was born in Ferrol on 14 October 1886, the son of Salvador Moreno y de Eliza — a Spanish Navy teniente de navío de 2ª clase (ship-of-the-line lieutenant second class) who later rose to the rank of vicealmirante (vice admiral) and was commander-in-chief of the Spanish Navy when he died in 1918 — and María Asunción Fernández y Antón. He grew up in Ferrol.

=== Naval career ===
==== 1903–1936 ====
Moreno entered the Spanish Navy in 1903 as a cadet and subsequently attended the Colegio Naval Militar (Naval Military College) aboard the training hulk Asturias (formerly the screw frigate Princesa de Asturias) at Ferrol. After completing the five-year course of study, he was commissioned as an officer with the rank of alférez de fragata (frigate ensign, the lower of the Spanish Navy's two ensign ranks) in September 1908 upon his graduation from the Colegio Naval Militar.

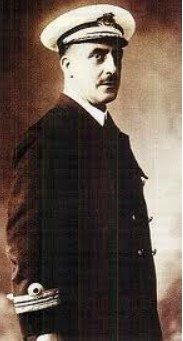
Moreno as a capitán de corbeta (corvette captain), sometime between 1922 and 1931.

Moreno's first assignments were to the gunboat Nueva España, the armored cruiser Princesa de Asturias, the gunboat Marqués de Molins, and the aviso Giralda, which at the time was the royal yacht. In 1914 he began a tour aboard the battleship España. He was promoted to teniente de navío (ship-of-the-line lieutenant) in 1916 and began an assignment on the staff of the Spanish fleet as personal aide to his father, Vicealmirante (Vice Admiral) Salvador Moreno de Eliza. Upon completing this assignment, he returned to duty aboard España.

Moreno reported aboard the gunboat Hernán Cortés in 1919, and in 1920 he became the commanding officer of the torpedo boat No. 12. In 1922 he relinquished command of No. 12 and, promoted to capitán de corbeta (corvette captain), began a tour of duty at the Arsenal de Ferrol in Ferrol. In 1924, he was appointed head of the Janer Naval Gunnery Range in Marín, a position he held until 1931. While in charge of the gunnery range, he also directed the School of Artillery and Naval Gunnery and the squadron of ships assigned to the range, and he also commanded the destroyer Villaamil from 11 January to 10 November 1925. He received the prestigious honorary title of Gentilhombre de cámara con ejercicio (Gentleman of the Bedchamber) to King Alfonso XIII in 1927, although this title was suppressed upon the proclamation of the Second Spanish Republic in 1931 while Moreno was still serving at the gunnery range. Later in 1931 he was promoted to capitán de fragata (frigate captain) and began an assignment as commander of the Ríos Secondary Naval Base in Vigo.

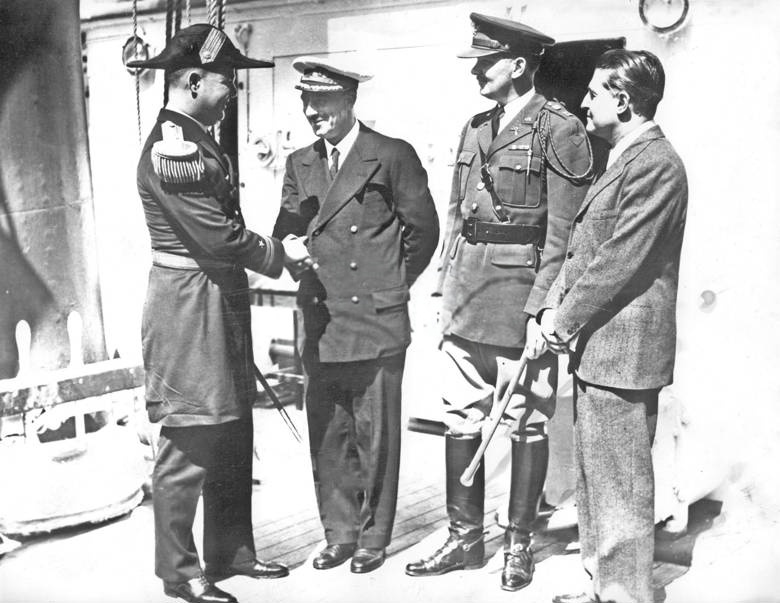
As commanding officer of the training ship Juan Sebastián de Elcano, Salvador Moreno Fernández (second from left), greets U.S. military personnel in the presence of the Spanish consul in New York City in 1935.

Moreno became commanding officer of the training ship Juan Sebastián de Elcano in 1933. Under his command, Juan Sebastián de Elcano got underway from Cádiz, Spain, on 15 July 1933 for a Mediterranean cruise in which she called at Cannes in France, Melilla in North Africa, two ports in the Balearic Islands — Mahón on Menorca and Palma de Mallorca on Mallorca — and Cartagena and Valencia in Spain before returning to Cádiz on 15 August 1933; covering 1,910 nautical miles (3,537 km; 2,198 mi) at an average speed of 4.9 knots (9.1 km/h; 5.6 mph), with 10% of the cruise conducted under sail, it remained as of 2022 the shortest cruise in the ship's history. His seventh training cruise in command was much longer. Departing Cádiz on 15 September 1933, Juan Sebastián de Elcano called at Ferrol and at Santa Cruz de Tenerife on Tenerife in the Canary Islands, made a transatlantic voyage to Rio de Janeiro in Brazil, then stopped at Montevideo in Uruguay and Buenos Aires in Argentina. The ship then made a transit of the Strait of Magellan, stopping at Magallanes (the name of Punta Arenas from 1927 to 1938) in Chile, before proceeding into the Pacific Ocean and northward up the coast of South America, calling at Valparaíso in Chile, Callao in Peru, and Balboa in the Panama Canal Zone. She then passed through the Panama Canal, stopped at San Juan, Puerto Rico, and made port calls at Charleston, South Carolina, and New York City in the United States before crossing the Atlantic Ocean and concluding the cruise at Ferrol on 31 May 1934. During the 258-day cruise, the ship had spent 203 days at sea and covered 21,458 nautical miles (39,740 km; 24,693 mi) at an average speed of 4.7 knots (8.7 km/h; 5.4 mph), spending 67% of the voyage under sail.

On another cruise under Moreno's command, Juan Sebastián de Elcano carried out a circumnavigation of the Earth. He relinquished command of Juan Sebastián de Elcano in 1935 and subsequently served as defense counsel during a court-martial of his older brother, the future almirante (admiral) Francisco Moreno Fernández.

==== Spanish Civil War ====
When the Spanish coup of July 1936 against the Second Spanish Republic took place, Moreno was assigned to reserve duty at the Arsenal de Ferrol in Ferrol. He immediately joined the Nationalist faction and took part in the military uprising in Ferrol that month as the Spanish Civil War broke out. The light cruiser Almirante Cervera was in drydock at the Arsenal de Ferrol for hull cleaning and minor repairs and under the control of officers, enlisted men, and civilians who supported the Republican faction and opposed the coup. On 21 July 1936, Moreno boarded the cruiser accompanied by Capitán de artillería (Captain of Artillery) Martínez Lorenzo, dissuaded the crew from opposing the coup, and took control of the ship for the Nationalists. For this action, the Nationalist faction awarded him the Naval Medal.

On 23 July 1936, Moreno took command of Almirante Cervera. She got underway from Ferrol on 26 July 1936 for crew training at sea and returned to port the next day. On 29 July she put back to sea and headed for the Bay of Biscay, where Moreno's first task was to operate in the Cantabrian Sea to aid Nationalist soldiers besieged in the Zapadores and Simancas barracks at Gijón by Republican forces in what became known as the Siege of Gijón. Under his command, Almirante Cervera assisted the Nationalist troops by bombarding targets they requested, especially in the vicinity of the besieged barracks. Although these bombardments were of no great military effectiveness, they had a significant positive impact on the morale of the besieged soldiers. The siege ended in the complete annihilation of the Nationalist garrison. The last communication Moreno received from the besieged barracks before they fell to the Republicans was "Fire on us; the enemy is inside," but he did not act on it because he believed it was a Republican ruse.

Almirante Cervera returned to Ferrol on 15 August 1936, where Republican aircraft attacked her that day. On 17 August, she again got underway for the Bay of Biscay in company with the battleship España. Almirante Cervera's incessant activity during this cruise earned her the nickname "El Chulo del Cantábrico" ("The Bully of the Cantabrian") as she conducted continuous operations to support Nationalist troops on the northern front, bombarded enemy positions, and captured ships.

After Almirante Cervera underwent repairs at the Arsenal de Ferrol between 15 and 17 September 1936, Moreno got her back underway in company with the heavy cruiser Canarias bound for the Strait of Gibraltar, where Spanish Republican Navy forces were weak because most of the Republican fleet had deployed to the Bay of Biscay. At the strait, the two Nationalist cruisers encountered the Republican destroyers Almirante Ferrándiz and Gravina. In the ensuing Battle of Cape Spartel on 29 September 1936, Canarias sank Almirante Ferrándiz while Almirante Cervera pursued Gravina. Although Almirante Cervera hit Gravina twice during the chase, her 152-millimetre (6-inch) guns were badly worn and fired inaccurately, and Gravina made port at Casablanca in French Morocco. Nonetheless, the battle gave the Nationalists control of the Strait of Gibraltar for the rest of the war.

In October 1936, Almirante Cervera entered the Mediterranean Sea, then returned to the Strait of Gibraltar to protect Nationalist shipping, and she sank a launch and the coast guard vessels Uad Lucus and Uad Muluya on 9 October. She searched for the Republican naval squadron between 16 and 19 October in an attempt to intercept it as it headed south from the Bay of Biscay. Operating both alone and with the Canarias, she remained active constantly, capturing merchant ships, transporting Nationalist troops, escorting convoys, and bombarding Republican positions, including on 11 January 1937 when Almirante Cervera and Canarias bombarded Republican forces defending Málaga. Nationalist forces captured Málaga during the Battle of Málaga in early February 1937, and on 8 February 1937 Moreno took part in the Málaga–Almería road massacre — also known in Spain as La Desbandá, a term conveying the sense of a panicked dispersal of people — in which Almirante Cervera (under Moreno's command), Canarias, the heavy cruiser Baleares, and Nationalist aircraft, tanks, and artillery indiscriminately bombarded civilians fleeing en masse along what is now the N-340 road from Málaga to Almería after the fall of Málaga to Nationalist forces, killing between 3,000 and 5,000 people, according to even the most conservative estimates provided by various sources.

Moreno was promoted to capitán de navío (ship-of-the-line captain) and took command of Canarias on 12 February 1937. His tour in command began inauspiciously, for on 13 February the 4,181-gross register ton Greek cargo ship Meropi suddenly appeared close aboard in dense fog and collided with Canarias, her bow scraping along Canarias′s starboard quarter as her anchor opened a gash in Canarias′s side. Canarias put in at the Arsenal de Ferrol in Ferrol for repairs, as well as for the installation of the last of her 120-millimetre (4.7-inch) guns, some of which had been left ashore in the rush to get her commissioned for wartime service in 1936.

With Canarias′s repairs complete and the last of her guns installed, Moreno received orders to deploy to the Bay of Biscay to intercept two cargo ships known to be bound for Spain with war matériel for Republican forces. Canarias found the first of them, Galdames, in the Cantabrian Sea on 5 March 1937 as Galdames, on a voyage from Bayonne, France, under escort by four Basque Auxiliary Navy trawlers, was trying to reach the cover of defensive minefields off Bilbao. In the ensuing Battle of Cape Machichaco, Canarias drove off the trawler Guipuzkoa with heavy damage, sank the trawler Nabarra and captured her 20 survivors, and seized Galdames. A few months later, Nabarra′s survivors were tried by court-martial and sentenced to death, but Moreno, impressed by the courage shown by Nabarra′s crew, interceded on their behalf with Francisco Franco, leading Franco to pardon them and release them in recognition of their bravery.

On 8 March 1937, Canarias captured the second cargo ship, the motor ship Mar Cantábrico, which was disguised as a British ship and was bound from Mexico to Spain loaded with war matériel for Republican forces, including 10 airplanes, 50 artillery pieces, 500 machine guns, and 14 million rifle cartridges. After sighting Mar Cantabria at 12:00, Moreno was forced to order Canarias to open fire on her to make her stop. After she stopped, a prize crew from Canarias went aboard her to put out fires that were detonating rifle ammunition in her holds and prevent her from sinking due to gunfire damage. The prize crew took her to Ferrol, her cargo was distributed to Nationalist forces, and the Nationalists armed her and incorporated her as an auxiliary cruiser into their fleet, of which she eventually became the flagship.

After capturing Mar Cantábrico, Moreno received orders to deploy to the Western Mediterranean. In those waters, Canarias escorted convoys carrying war material to the Nationalists from Fascist Italy, all of which arrived safely. She also raided Republican shipping carrying supplies from the Soviet Union and sank several of those ships, and she conducted frequent shore bombardments. On occasion, Republican naval forces offered combat at night, but Moreno shied away from night engagements because he feared that the Nationalist cruisers were vulnerable to torpedo attack. Early on the morning of 25 April 1937, however, Canarias and Baleares pursued two Republican destroyers they found guarding the approaches to Cartagena in anticipation of a heavily escorted convoy arriving there. All the Republican ships reached safety. The two heavy cruisers then searched for Republican warships the Nationalists knew were at sea, but did not find them.

Moreno relinquished command of Canarias in August 1937 and in October 1937 assumed duties at Burgos as the deputy chief of staff of the Nationalist faction's navy. In March 1939 he traveled to Bizerte in French Tunisia aboard the destroyer Císcar to oversee of the surrender of most of the Spanish Republican Navy's fleet, which had taken refuge there after fleeing Cartagena. On 30 March he took control of the surrendering ships, which got underway from Bizerte on 2 April, reached Algeciras on 5 April, and arrived at Cádiz on 8 April 1939.

Meanwhile, the Spanish Civil War concluded on 1 April 1939 in victory for the Nationalists and the establishment of Francoist Spain. By a decree of 30 May 1939, the Francoist government awarded Moreno the Laureate Cross of Saint Ferdinand for his role in gaining Nationalist control of Almirante Cervera in 1936.

==== Later career ====
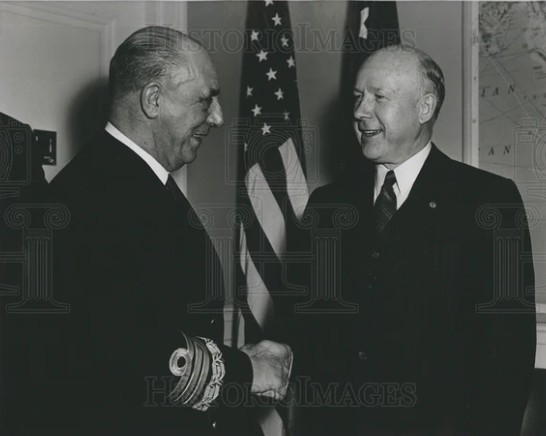
During a visit to the United States as Minister of the Navy, Moreno (left) shakes hands with United States Secretary of the Navy Charles Thomas at the Pentagon in Arlington, Virginia, on 10 May 1955.

In July 1939 Moreno was promoted to contralmirante (counter admiral), and on 9 August 1939 he became Minister of the Navy, a position he held until 1945. In that role, he was responsible for undertaking the reconstruction of the Spanish Navy after the Spanish Civil War. He also moved the Colegio Naval Militar (Naval Military College) from Ferrol to Marín. He was promoted to vicealmirante (vice admiral) on 24 July 1942.

While minister of the navy, Moreno was one of the highest-ranking officials of the Francoist regime to oppose Spanish intervention in World War II (1939–1945). He strongly insisted that Spain not take part in the war, and he and then-Capitán de fragata (Frigate Captain) Luis Carrero Blanco drafted a highly influential report dated 11 November 1940 advising against Spanish intervention in the conflict. Spain officially remained neutral in the war, although it did participate by sending volunteer formations, the Blue Division and later the Blue Legion, to fight alongside the Axis powers on the Eastern Front and by building submarines for the German Kriegsmarine, an effort in which Moreno participated.

After concluding his first stint as minister of the navy on 20 July 1945, Moreno was named ambassador extraordinary to Argentina for the inauguration of Juan Perón as President of Argentina. He travelled to Argentina aboard the light cruiser Galicia, departing Ferrol del Caudillo on 20 May 1946, stopping at Las Palmas on Gran Canaria in the Canary Islands, and arriving at Buenos Aires on 1 June 1946. He attended the inauguration there on 4 June 1946. For the return trip to Spain, Galicia departed Buenos Aires on 18 June, stopped at Las Palmas on 2 July, and called at Tenerife in the Canary Islands from 4 to 6 July 1946 before proceeding to Galicia.

In October 1946 Moreno became commander of the Northern Squadron, overseeing the squadron's participation in maneuvers and ceremonial duties in the Atlantic Ocean, Cantabrian Sea, and Mediterranean Sea, including visits to Portugal, the Balearic Islands, and a number of Spanish cities. Relinquishing command of the squadron, he was promoted to almirante (admiral) and appointed captain general of the Maritime Department of Ferrol del Caudillo in April 1950. He was awarded the Grand Cross of the Cross of Aeronautical Merit in 1951, and was reappointed Minister of the Navy on 19 July 1951. As minister, he presided over a commission that represented Spain at the coronation of Queen Elizabeth II in London on 2 June 1953 and was among the guests at the coronation ceremony itself. He continued to serve as minister of the navy until 25 February 1957.

In retirement, Moreno was elected chairman of the board of directors of the ferry company Trasmediterránea, a position he held until his death. He died in Madrid on 2 May 1966. A decree of 2 June 1966 directed that he be buried in the Panteón de Marinos Ilustres (Pantheon of Illustrious Mariners) in San Fernando, Spain. His remains finally were interred at the Pantheon on 7 June 1973 with the highest honors possible in the Spanish Navy, equivalent to those for a captain general of the Navy killed in action aboard his flagship while in command of the fleet.

=== Personal life ===
Moreno was the second of four siblings. His older brother, Francisco Moreno Fernández, became an almirante (admiral) in the Spanish Navy and served as commander-in-chief of the Nationalist faction's navy during the Spanish Civil War. His younger sister Concepción married Francisco Bastarreche, an admiral who also served in the Nationalist faction's navy. His younger brother Juan Antonio was a capitán de artillería (captain of artillery) who died of influenza in Larache in Spanish Morocco in 1918 during the Spanish flu pandemic.

Moreno married Rosina Aznar Bárcenas on 10 October 1912. The couple had ten children.

== Commemoration ==
In addition to Moreno's enshrinement in the Pantheon of Illustrious Mariners, streets were named after him in Marín and Pontevedra. He also was named a Favorite Son of Ferrol.

== Honors and awards ==
=== Francoist Spain ===
- Naval Medal
- Medalla de la Campaña (Campaign Medal)
- Laureate Cross of Saint Ferdinand (1939)
- Grand Cross of the Cross of Aeronautical Merit (1951)
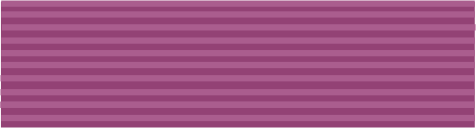
- Grand Cross of the Order of Cisneros
- Gold Medal of Youth
- Silver Medal of El Ferrol del Caudillo

=== Foreign ===
- Order of Naval Merit (Brazil)
- Legion of Merit (United States)

Moreno also was a knight of the Order of Saint Lazarus of Jerusalem

== Criminal accountability and stripping of honors ==
In the 21st century, Spain began to take action to address the legacy of the Franco regime as well as the posthumous reputation of its supporters, including Moreno. In 2002, the street in Pontevedra named for him was renamed. After the 2007 passage of the Historical Memory Law, which condemned the Francoist state and required the removal from public buildings and spaces of objects which exalt the July 1936 coup against the Second Spanish Republic, the Spanish Civil War, and Francoist repression, the street named for him in Marín was renamed in honor of the Galician poet and novelist Rosalía de Castro in 2007.

Posthumously, Moreno was one of 35 high-ranking officials of the Franco regime indicted by the Audiencia Nacional (National Court) in a case brought in 2006 by Baltasar Garzón for crimes of illegal detention and crimes against humanity they committed during the Spanish Civil War and in the early years of the regime that followed. In 2012, the Supreme Court ruled that Garzón's classification of the acts as "crimes against humanity" was erroneous as a matter of legal principle because the concept of such crimes was not defined until after the events in question took place.

The Association for Democratic Military Memory submitted a petition to the Spanish Ministry of Defense in 2024 for the exhumation of Moreno's remains and the removal of his commemorative plaque and tombstone from the Pantheon of Illustrious Mariners, invoking the 2022 Democratic Memory Law, which mandated the removal of symbols of the Francoist dictatorship and prohibited its promotion or glorification. The petition succeeded, and Moreno's remains were exhumed on 3 August 2024 and returned to his family.
