= Francisco Moreno Fernández (admiral) =

Spanish admiral (1883–1945)

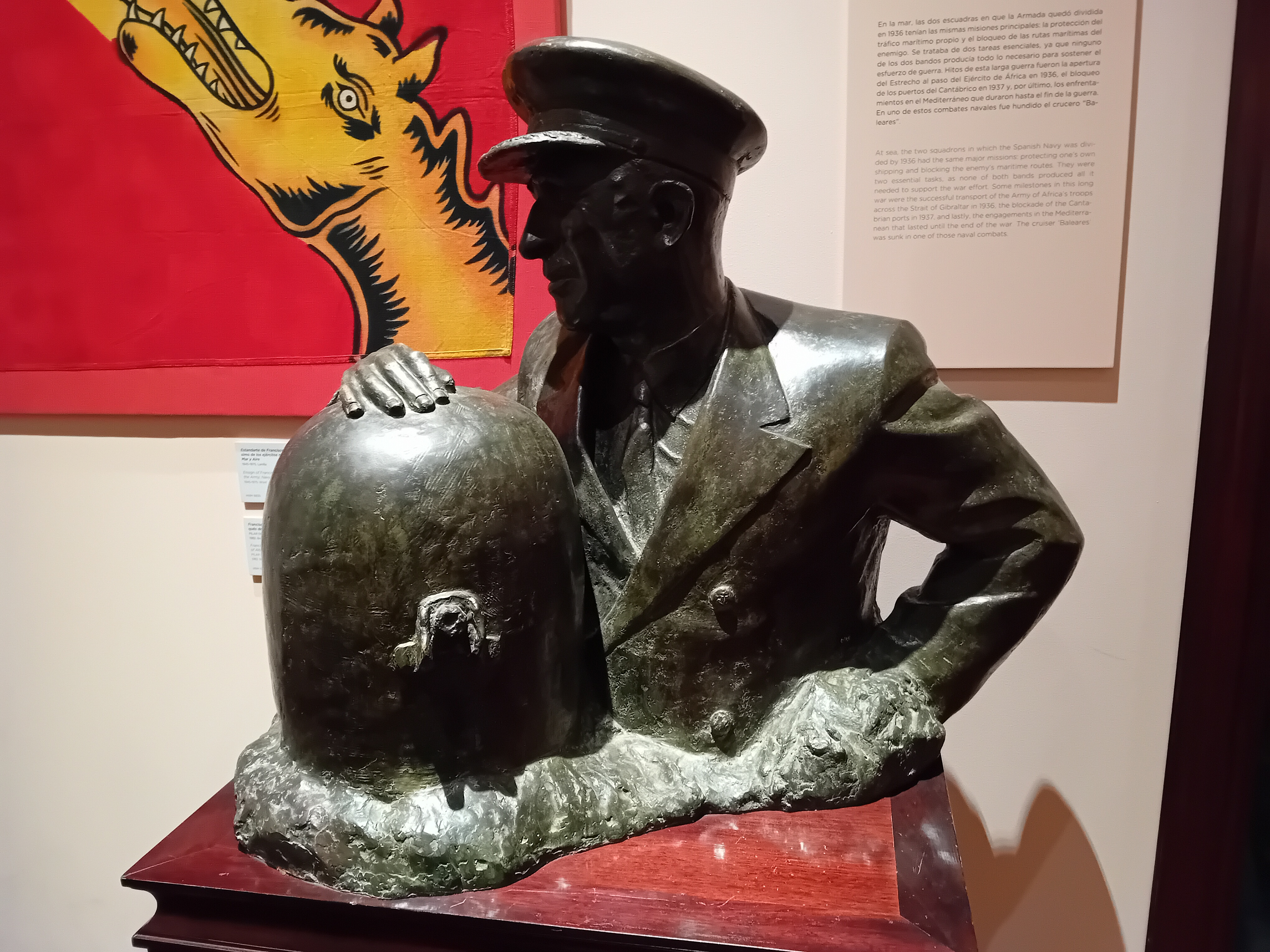
- A bronze statue of Francisco Moreno Fernández created by Pilar de la Cámara in 1982, photographed at the Naval Museum of Madrid on 27 October 2023.
- Born: 7 November 1883; San Fernando, Kingdom of Spain
- Died: 21 January 1945 (aged 61); Ferrol del Caudillo, Spanish State
- Burial place: Panteón de Marinos Ilustres, San Fernando, Spain; 36°28′47″N 006°11′37″W
- Relatives: Salvador Moreno Fernández (brother); Pablo Alborán (great-grandson)
- Military career
- Allegiance: Kingdom of Spain (to 1931); Second Spanish Republic (1931–1936); Nationalist faction (1936—1939); Spanish State (from 1939)
- Service: Spanish Navy
- Service years: 1898–1945
- Rank: Almirante (Admiral)
- Commands: No. 12; Larache; Galatea; Sánchez Barcáiztegui; Nationalist fleet; Mediterranean Blockade Forces; Captain General of Cartagena Naval Department; Captain General of Ferrol del Caudillo Naval Department
- Conflicts: Rif War; Spanish Civil War; Battle of Cape Spartel; Battle of Málaga; Málaga–Almería road massacre

Francisco Moreno Fernández (7 November 1883 – 21 January 1945) was a Spanish Navy admiral who fought in the Rif War and later participated in the coup d'état in Spain against the Second Spanish Republic in July 1936 that triggered the Spanish Civil War (1936–1939). He fought on the Nationalist side during the war, rising to the rank of vicealmirante (vice admiral) in the Nationalist fleet and was both its commander-in-chief throughout the war and the commander of its Mediterranean Blockade Forces from 1937 to 1939. He later reached the rank of almirante (admiral). For his service, General Francisco Franco posthumously awarded him the title of 1st Marquis of Alborán on 1 April 1950.

== Biography ==
=== Early life and career ===
Moreno was born in San Fernando in the Kingdom of Spain on 7 November 1883, the eldest child of Salvador Moreno y de Eliza — a Spanish Navy teniente de navío de 2ª clase (ship-of-the-line lieutenant second class) who later rose to the rank of vicealmirante (vice admiral) and was commander-in-chief of the Spanish Navy when he died in 1918 — and María Asunción Fernández y Antón. A few months after his birth, his father was transferred to duties in Ferrol, Spain, where Moreno grew up.

=== Naval career ===
==== Kingdom of Spain ====
===== 1898–1920 =====
Moreno passed his naval entry exam and joined the Spanish Navy on 9 July 1898 at the age of 14. He attended the Colegio Naval Militar (Military Naval College) aboard the training hulk Asturias (formerly the screw frigate Princesa de Asturias) at Ferrol. After obtaining the rank of midshipman, he disembarked from Asturias on 7 February 1901, and on 25 February he boarded the armored cruiser Emperador Carlos V, remaining aboard for a few days before returning to Asturias. Two weeks later, he returned to Emperador Carlos V and remained aboard her until 19 May 1901. He soon reported aboard the corvette Nautilus, which was operating as a training ship, and made his mandatory training cruise aboard her, which took him to the Cantabrian Sea and Atlantic Ocean with stops at major ports in Africa and South America. After completing the cruise, he disembarked from Nautilus on 18 April 1902. His next assignment was the completion of his practical training aboard Emperador Carlos V, and aboard her he steamed off the northern coast of Spain, France, and the United Kingdom. While visiting the United Kingdom, he attended a fleet review at Spithead on 16 August 1902, held as part of the celebration of the coronation of King Edward VII a week earlier. He disembarked from Emperador Carlos V on 8 February 1903 and completed his studies at the Colegio Naval Militar on 1 April 1903, graduating fourth in his class.

Commissioned upon graduation as an officer with the rank of alférez de fragata (frigate ensign, the lower of the Spanish Navy's two ensign ranks), he reported aboard the armored cruiser Cardenal Cisneros. He detached from her on 15 August 1903. In September 1903, he began a tour aboard the protected cruiser Lepanto, and while aboard her he received a promotion to alférez de navío (ship-of-the-line ensign, the higher of the Spanish Navy's two ensign ranks) on 30 March 1904. Leaving Lepanto on 5 August 1905, he served as adjutant major of the Arsenal de Ferrol at Ferrol from 15 September until mid-November 1905, when he was transferred to the aviso Giralda, which at the time served as a royal yacht. He detached from Giralda on 18 May 1907 and served again as adjutant major of the Arsenal de Ferrol for just under two months. His next assignment was in the office of the chief of staff of the Naval Department of Ferrol, where he performed duty from 13 July 1907 to 10 August 1908.

Moreno next served aboard the gunboat Vasco Núñez de Balboa, disembarking from her on 6 October 1909 for duty aboard the armored cruiser Cataluña. He left Cataluña on 19 November 1909, then served aboard Nautilus until 21 November 1910. From 22 November until 1 December 1910 he fulfilled a brief assignment in the chief of staff's office of the Naval Department of Ferrol. On 2 January 1911 he began the hydrography course aboard the survey ship Urania, embarking on her on 21 January and participating in a hydrographic survey cruise aboard her until 10 December 1911. He began a second surveying cruise aboard her on 17 December 1911, receiving notice during the cruise on 22 April 1912 of his promotion to teniente de navío (ship-of-the-line lieutenant). He qualified for his hydrographer's specialist insignia on 28 December 1912. He continued his work aboard Urania until 20 January 1913, when he disembarked and began temporary duties at the Arsenal de Ferrol. On 28 January 1913, he was assigned to the battleship España. Initially he was part of the battleship's inspection commission, but on 8 September 1913 he became her navigation officer and electrical officer.

While Moreno was aboard España, World War I (1914–1918) broke out in the summer of 1914. Spain remained neutral during the conflict, but in the spring of 1917 the German Imperial Admiralty invited the Spanish minister of the navy to send several Spanish naval officers on an official visit to the German Empire. The minister selected four tenientes de navío (ship-of-the-line lieutenants) including Moreno, who spoke German, to serve as a "Commission of Experts" for the trip. Moreno temporarily detached from España, and he and the other three officers departed on 5 August 1917. They arrived in German-occupied Belgium, where they received a detailed tour of the naval base at Bruges and the port of Zeebrugge, including the coastal artillery defenses of Zeebrugge. They then made an overland journey to Germany, passing very close to the front lines on the Western Front in the town of Nieuwkerke, Belgium. In Germany, they toured the shipyard and naval base at Wilhelmshaven, where they boarded the battlecruiser SMS Moltke and were received aboard her by the commander of the Imperial German Navy's I Scouting Group, Vizeadmiral (Vice Admiral) Franz von Hipper, who accompanied them on a visit to the light cruiser SMS Karlsruhe. Hipper parted company with them there, and they then boarded the battleship SMS Kaiser Friedrich III, flagship of the High Seas Fleet, where they visited the fleet's commander-in-chief, Admiral Reinhard Scheer. They then toured the facilities at the Alhornt Zeppelin base and the submarine and torpedo facilities at Kiel before boarding German destroyers, which performed various maneuvers and torpedo launches while the Spaniards looked on. They next traveled to Essen, where they visited several Krupp factories and observed the manufacture of artillery. Finally, they visited the German Supreme Headquarters at Bad Kreuznach to be received by the Chief of the General Staff, Generalfeldmarschall (Field Marshal) Paul von Hindenburg, and the Chief of the Naval Staff, Großadmiral (Grand Admiral) Henning von Holtzendorff. They then returned to Spain, where they arrived on 19 September 1917. When they reached Spain, Moreno and his colleagues provided Minister of the Navy Manuel de Flórez y Carrió with a detailed report — including drawings — of what they had seen in Belgium and Germany. Impressed, Flórez presented them to King Alfonso XIII, who also was impressed with their thoroughness and ordered that they be given his royal thanks.

Moreno returned to España, serving aboard her until 9 February 1918, when he transferred to Emperador Carlos V to observe the testing of the new "A/08" and "Blitz Leavitt" guns aboard her so that he could make a report on them. After completing the report, he returned to España on 2 March 1918, assuming duty as her navigation officer. On 12 August 1918 he received word that he had been given his first command, that of the torpedo boat No. 12, because of his expertise in torpedoes. He disembarked from España on 13 August and took command of No. 12, aboard which he provided torpedo instruction to midshipmen in the Training Squadron. In August 1920, he relinquished command of No. 12 to his brother, Salvador, and went on leave for two months, returning to duty on 24 October 1920.

===== 1921–1936 =====
Promoted to capitán de corbeta (corvette captain) on 11 January 1921, Moreno was assigned to duty as the second-in-command of the Northern Hydrographic Subcommission, based at Castro Urdiales on Spain's northern coast. His surveying work included triangulation between Tazones and Peñas and depth soundings between Deva and Peñas. To carry out a special commission ordered by the captain general of the Naval Department of Ferrol, he embarked on the destroyer Proserpina from 26 September to 15 October 1921, then resumed his duties with the hydrographic subcommission.

Moreno concluded his work with the subcommission on 29 March 1922, then was a student at the naval gunnery school from 1 April to 10 August 1922. He received a diploma on 18 August 1922 for his outstanding performance as a student. He then reported aboard España to complete his practical training in gunnery and wrote a report for his superiors. He returned to the hydrographic subcommission at Santander on 1 September 1922 and conducted surveys between Cape La Peña and Cape San Lorenzo and along the Spanish coast off Gijón, Candás, Luanco, and Peñas. Completing this work, he left the commission again on 10 June 1923. He then served as gunnery officer and electrical officer aboard the battleship Jaime I from 27 June 1923 to 12 June 1924.

As a capitán de corbeta (corvette captain), Moreno required a year of command at sea, so on 23 June 1924 he took command of the patrol boat Larache. Under his command, Larache took part in combat against the Rifians along the coast of Spanish Morocco during the Rif War, spending 245 days at sea and firing 555 76.2-millimetre (3-inch) and 259 37-millimetre (1.5-inch) shells and 5,500 rifle rounds. She also encountered a fierce easterly storm that struck her on 18 November 1924 during a voyage from Ceuta on the coast of North Africa to Almería, Spain. Over the course of 76 hours, in hurricane-force winds and waves at least 9 metres (30 feet) in height that broke over her bow and sometimes struck her superstructure, she experienced dangerous flooding that forced Moreno to order the protective plating stored below and all of her 76.2-millimetre (3-inch) ammunition — weighing 2.5 tons — to be thrown overboard. The battleship Alfonso XIII and armored cruiser Cataluña attempted to come to her assistance, but the severe weather prevented them from reaching her. Nonetheless, she finally moored safely at Almería at 16:00 on 21 November 1924. Moreno received approximately 100 telegrams after arriving, one of which, from King Alfonso XIII, read "Congratulations. You gave me a hard time. Hugs, Alfonso."

On 27 June 1925, Moreno received an appointment as a professor at the newly created Naval War College in Madrid. Accordingly, he relinquished command of Larache on 21 August 1925 and made his way to Madrid, which he reached on 23 August. To achieve his certification as an instructor at the college, he first completed classroom work and then embarked on the destroyer Lazaga from 1 July to 18 September 1926 for practical training. With that done, he returned to the college to receive his instructional certificate on 30 September 1926. He again embarked on Lazaga from 19 June to 18 September 1927. His tour at the college came to an end on 31 January 1928.

Moreno began another stint with the hydrographic commission on 1 February 1928, this time serving as its head in Madrid. The commander-in-chief of the navy ordered him to sea to serve as fleet adjutant during fleet maneuvers from 10 October to 12 November 1928. During the maneuvers he received a promotion to capitán de fragata (frigate captain) on 3 November 1928. He returned to the hydrographic commission, which he reorganized. He also submitted a report recommending the construction of two survey ships in Spain. After their construction was approved, he traveled to Monaco, La Spezia, Genoa, and Paris to look into possibilities for building them. He learned that the United Kingdom had delivered two ships to Argentina and he contacted Buenos Aires for more information on them. When he returned to Madrid, he met with the engineers responsible for building the Spanish ships — to be named Tofiño and Malaspina — and made plans for their later construction. After they entered service, the ships were highly successful.

On 15 January 1929 Moreno left the hydrographic commission, assumed new duties as assistant secretary at the Ministry of the Navy, and was attached to the Naval War College. He completed his war college assignment on 26 June 1929, and on 27 June he joined the studies office of the General Staff. He remained there only until 13 September 1929, when he resigned because of disagreements with the policies of Minister of the Navy Mateo García de los Reyes.

Moreno embarked on the light cruiser Príncipe Alfonso on 15 September 1929 to serve on the staff of the Cruiser Division. He transferred to the light cruiser Almirante Cervera and served as her chief of staff from 29 November 1929 to 16 September 1930. On 18 September 1930 he became deputy director of the Naval War College, and on 5 December 1930 assumed additional duty in the operations section of the navy's general staff. As part of his war college duties, he embarked on the destroyer Sánchez Barcáiztegui from 20 to 30 July 1931 to oversea practical testing of war college students.

Moreno completed his tours at the Naval War College and the naval general staff on 26 September 1931. From 30 September 1931 to 24 March 1932, he commanded the training ship Galatea, simultaneously performing duty as director of the Seamanship School, which was housed aboard the ship.

==== Second Spanish Republic ====
While Moreno was aboard Galatea, the Second Spanish Republic was proclaimed on 14 April 1931. In the Spanish Republican Navy, he continued his service without interruption. He was interim Head of the 1st Section (Organization) of the navy's general staff from 25 March to 2 July 1932, during which he participated in a commission Minister of the Navy Santiago Casares Quiroga had created in June 1931 to study and make a proposal regarding the organizational transformation of the Spanish Navy. He then commanded the destroyer Sánchez Barcáiztegui from 6 July 1932 to 11 January 1933. He became deputy director of the Naval War College and head of the operations department of the navy general staff on 16 January 1933, and took part in a commission Minister of the Navy José Giral Pereira had established in April 1932 to prepare a report on the state of the navy and its main needs to establish the basis for the Republic's main naval plans. He made a survey of the Spanish Navy's aviation service, the Aeronáutica Naval, and concluded that the old Dornier and Savoia seaplanes were not fit to carry aerial torpedoes or bombs and were fit only for reconnaissance missions. He also found that the seaplane carrier Dédalo, although she had a very useful and efficient aircraft-repair workshop, was a slow and old steamer whose service life was reaching its end.

Between 28 June and 11 July 1933 Moreno embarked on Almirante Cervera to serve as deputy chief of staff of the Spanish fleet during maneuvers. He made a study trip to visit foreign shipyards and several foreign warships, leaving Madrid on 6 August 1933, stopping at Barcelona on 7 August, and arrived in Toulon in France on 8 August. He then headed for Fascist Italy, where he arrived in Genoa on 10 August and visited the Ansaldo shipyards. He arrived in La Spezia on 11 August, Rome on 14 August, and Naples — where he visited the torpedo factory at nearby Castellammare di Stabia — on 16 August. After a final stop at Venice on 19 August, he returned to Spain at Portbou on 29 August and arrived in Madrid on 31 August 1933.

Completing his Naval War College tour on 5 January 1934, Moreno stayed on there as interim director while simultaneously retaining his position on the navy general staff. On 27 January 1934 he became the war college's permanent director, still retaining his navy general staff position. He took part in an interministerial commission the Republican government organized in 1934 to study the defense of the Balearic Islands. He also embarked on the destroyer Almirante Valdés from 9 to 18 April and the destroyer Lazaga from 30 May to 2 June 1934, and as a participant in fleet maneuvers he embarked as part of the general staff aboard the submarine C-6 from 6 to 10 June 1934. The Revolution of 1934 began on 5 October 1934, and on 10 October Moreno was attached to the Ministry of War as a naval liaison officer and served as part of the leadership of the campaign against the insurrection, which ended on 19 October. On 22 October he returned to his duties at the war college and on the navy general staff.

Moreno received a promotion to capitán de navío (ship-of-the-line captain) on 5 January 1935. During his duties on the navy general staff he got into a heated argument with the undersecretary of the navy that year, and on 12 June 1935 was subjected to a court-martial for insulting the undersecretary. His brother Salvador participated in his legal defense. On 30 July 1935 the court-martial placed him on compulsory leave until 4 July, then on administrative leave until 2 August, when he began serving a sentence of two months' suspension from active duty. After completing his sentence, he returned to naval service on 2 October, but again was placed on mandatory leave until 13 November 1935, when on a compulsory basis he began an assignment to oversee the construction of the heavy cruisers Canarias and Baleares, then fitting out at the Arsenal de Ferrol in Ferrol.

==== Spanish Civil War ====
Moreno still was at Ferrol in his assignment to oversee the fitting out of Canarias and Baleares when the 18 July 1936 coup against the Second Spanish Republic triggered the outbreak of the Spanish Civil War. He joined the Nationalist faction, taking command of the Arsenal de Ferrol by arresting its commanding officer, Contralmirante (Counter Admiral) Antonio Azarola, who remained steadfastly loyal to the republic and was executed by firing squad on 4 August 1936 after a summary trial.

The Nationalist government, headquartered in Burgos, appointed Moreno chief of the Nationalist fleet on 30 or 31 July 1936, according to different sources — a position he held until the end of the war — and made him a member of the Defense Council. At first his flagship was the battleship España (the former Alfonso XIII), but on 31 August 1936 he transferred his flag to Canarias, which was rushed into service before the shipyard could install all her guns. Moreno and Canarias′s commanding officer, Capitán de navío (Ship-of-the-Line Captain) Francisco Bastarreche, scrounged secondary guns from other ships and other equipment to make her capable of combat and put together a largely inexperienced crew. Moreno's staff reported aboard on 4 September, and the ship was drydocked on 18 September to have her bottom cleaned. Moreno and Bastarreche made a brief training cruise from 18 to 22 September 1936 to familiarize her crew with her.

When Moreno learned that the Republican fleet had deployed most of its strength to the Bay of Biscay, leaving only a small force of destroyers to blockade the coasts of southern Spain and North Africa in and around the Strait of Gibraltar, he saw an opportunity to break the Republican blockade so that Nationalist troops in Spanish Morocco could reach Spain and reinforce the Nationalist forces there. On 27 September 1936 he put to sea aboard Canarias in company with Almirante Cervera (which was under the command of his brother Salvador), headed south from Ferrol under radio silence, held gunnery exercises along the way, and approached the Strait of Gibraltar during the night of 28–29 September. At dawn on 29 September, the cruisers sighted the Republican destroyer Gravina, and the Battle of Cape Spartel began. Almirante Cervera set out in pursuit, but her 152-millimetre (6-inch) guns were badly worn, and she managed to hit Gravina only twice before Gravina reached safety at Casablanca in French Morocco. Meanwhile, Canarias sighted a shape on the horizon and Moreno, guessing that it was another Republican destroyer, ordered Canarias to give chase. The shape turned out to be the Republican destroyer Almirante Ferrándiz, and Canarias opened fire on her at 06:40 at a range of 11 nautical miles (20 km; 13 mi), hitting Almirante Ferrándiz and setting her on fire with her second salvo. By 07:05 Canarias had begun to fire full broadsides, and by 07:20 Almirante Ferrándiz was a burning wreck. Almirante Ferrándiz suffered a series of explosions and sank, bringing the battle to an end. The Battle of Cape Spartel was one of the most decisive actions of the Spanish Civil War: Republican forces never again controlled the Strait of Gibraltar, and the lifting of the Republican blockade allowed Nationalist reinforcements to stream into Spain, preventing Republican ground forces from gaining the upper hand there.

Encountering little Republican opposition, Moreno canceled his plans to return to Ferrol after lifting the blockade, and instead kept his two cruisers in the Strait of Gibraltar and Mediterranean Sea, basing them at Cádiz. Republican naval forces generally avoided combat while the Nationalist cruisers bombarded the Spanish coast as far north as Roses (Spanish: Rosas), escorted a large number of Nationalist convoys from Spanish Morocco to Spain, and kept open the Nationalist sea lines of communication to Mallorca in the Balearic Islands. The cruisers also raided Republican shipping lanes, detaining or seizing ships carrying military cargoes. Some of these ships came from the Soviet Union, which supported the Republican faction, and on 14 December 1936, after receiving a tip from an Italian Regia Marina (Royal Navy) warship, Canarias stopped the Soviet motor ship Komsomol, a cargo ship which had made a number of voyages bringing supplies to Republican forces. The Soviet captain claimed to be carrying a cargo of ore to Belgium. Moreno, aware of Komsomol′s history of carrying military cargoes, decided that there was insufficient time to search Komsomol before darkness fell and gave her an opportunity to escape, so he decided to take the drastic action of sinking her without determining the nature of her cargo. The Spaniards brought Komsomol′s 36-man crew aboard Canarias — leaving behind three kittens on Komsomol′s deck to go down with the ship — and sank Komosomol with gunfire. The international community deemed Moreno's action a violation of international law, but Soviet aid to the Republicans dwindled afterward and the Soviets limited their shipments to Spanish ships.

On 11 January 1937 Canarias and Almirante Cervera bombarded Republican forces defending Málaga. Nationalist forces captured Málaga during the Battle of Málaga in early February 1937, and on 8 February 1937 Moreno's cruisers took part in the Málaga–Almería road massacre — also known in Spain as La Desbandá, a term conveying the sense of a panicked dispersal of people — in which Canarias, Baleares, Almirante Cervera, and Nationalist aircraft, tanks, and artillery indiscriminately bombarded civilians fleeing en masse along the N-340 road from Málaga to Almería after the fall of Málaga to Nationalist forces, killing between 3,000 and 5,000 people according to even the most conservative estimates provided by various sources.

Moreno's brother Salvador took command of Canarias on 12 February 1937. His tour in command began inauspiciously, for on 13 February the 4,181-gross register ton Greek cargo ship Meropi suddenly appeared close aboard in dense fog and collided with Canarias, her bow scraping along Canarias′s starboard quarter as her anchor opened a gash in Canarias′s side. Canarias proceeded to Cádiz for repairs, and Moreno transferred his flag to Baleares. After Canarias′s repairs were complete, he transferred his flag back to her in June 1937. Moreno's campaign against Republican shipping intensified during the summer of 1937 — during which Moreno received a promotion to contralmirante (counter admiral) on 22 July 1937 — and culminated in an action on 18 September 1937 when three Republican destroyers escorting a convoy from Barcelona to Menorca in the Balearic Islands fled after a brief engagement and Canarias captured the merchant ships Jaime II and J. J. Síster.

Moreno received a promotion to acting vicealmirante (vice admiral) on 10 October 1937, when by Decree No. 356 of that date he assumed additional duty as Commander-in-Chief of the Land, Sea, and Air Forces of the Mediterranean blockade, based at Palma de Mallorca on Mallorca in the Balearic Islands, another position he held until the end of the war. He transferred his flag to the auxiliary cruiser Mar Cantabria in October 1937.

Republican naval forces sank Baleares with heavy loss of life in the Battle of Cape Palos on 6 March 1938, a significant blow to the Nationalist fleet's capabilities and morale that prompted the Nationalist faction's leader, General Francisco Franco, to give a speech a few days later that was highly critical of the Nationalist naval forces. The twin blows of the loss of Baleares and Franco's speech had such a negative effect on the fleet that desertions were reported among Nationalist naval personnel. Moreno decided to visit all the ships under his command to convince his subordinates of all ranks of his continued confidence in final victory for the Nationalists.

On 4 March 1939, as the Spanish Civil War entered its final four weeks, Franco received news of an uprising against the Republican government in Cartagena and ordered the Nationalist fleet's chief of staff, Vicealmirante (Vice Admiral) Juan Cervera Valderrama, to send troops to seize the Arsenal de Cartagena and prevent the Republican fleet from scuttling its ships in port there. Without informing Moreno of Franco's orders or his own activities, Cervera instructed Nationalist forces at Vinaròs to prepare a convoy of merchant ships for the voyage to Cartagena as quickly as possible. On 5 March, Moreno sent instructions regarding a previous order from Franco to take Valencia, unintentionally contradicting Franco's orders, but Franco remained silent. The 10 merchant ships assigned to the Cartagena operation departed Vinaròs between 04:00 and 22:00 on 6 March, steaming the 150 nautical miles (278 km; 173 mi) to Cartagena independently rather than in convoy, exposing them to greater danger of attack by Republican warships and aircraft. The Nationalist minelayers Júpiter, Marte, and Vulcano provided escort for the ships.

Moreno finally found out about the operation through a conversation with the commanding officer of Marte, and promptly ordered his flagship, the auxiliary cruiser Mar Cantábrico, to get underway from Palma de Mallorca so that he could verify that the Arsenal de Cartagena actually was under Nationalist control. He had Mar Cantábrico display the Spanish Navy flag in use by the Nationalist fleet prominently as she approached Cartagena, and shortly afterward it became clear that Republican forces still held the well-defended arsenal when coastal artillery opened fire on her. He ordered his ships to instruct the merchant ships heading for Cartagena to return to Vinaròs, but they were scattered along the route from Vinaròs to Cartagena and two of them, Castillo Peñafiel and Castillo Olite, did not have radios. Moreno ordered the gunboats Canalejas, Cánovas, and Dato to steam across the ships' most likely route to intercept them. Meanwhile Castillo Peñafiel suffered damage and casualties when Republican aircraft attacked her off Cape Palos, forcing her to abort her voyage and struggle through worsening weather to Ibiza, which she reached in very poor condition on 8 March at 16:00.

Castillo Olite remained missing. The light cruiser Navarra joined in the search for her, as did Almirante Cervera on 9 March. On 10 March, Moscow radio reported the sinking of a merchant ship at the entrance to Cartagena's harbor off Escombreras. On 11 March, Vulcano captured the schooner Manuel off Santa Pola and found aboard her 19 marine infantrymen who had escaped from Cartagena to join the Nationalists and claimed that on 6 March they had read about the sinking. After the Nationalists finally seized control of Cartagena, they learned that Castillo Olite, with 2,112 Nationalist soldiers aboard and unaware that Republican forces had quelled the uprising and remained in control of Cartagena, arrived at Cartagena alone on the morning of 7 March and approached the harbor. Republican coastal artillery sank her off Escombreras, killing 1,477 of the men on board and wounding 342. The Republicans captured all 635 survivors and executed some of them, while others escaped, some died of malnutrition, and the rest were released when the Nationalists arrived. It was the greatest loss of life at sea in a single event during the Spanish Civil War. Franco took no responsibility for the disaster or for not informing Moreno of his orders, instead blaming the Nationalist naval forces — and indirectly Moreno — for providing inadequate support to the operation.

On 28 March 1939, Moreno relinquished his command. After a one-day assignment to "Service Contingencies" on 29 March, he was appointed captain general of the Naval Department of Cartagena, where he was responsible for reestablishing services at the just-captured Arsenal de Cartagena, on 1 April 1939. The Spanish Civil War ended that day in a Nationalist victory and the establishment of Francoist Spain.

==== Francoist Spain ====
On 27 July 1939, Moreno, up until then an acting vicealmirante (vice admiral), received an official promotion to that rank. Appointed to serve as captain general of the Naval Department of Ferrol del Caudillo (as Ferrol had been renamed in 1938) on 16 August 1939, he relinquished command in Cartagena on 4 September and assumed his new duties at Ferrol del Caudillo on 23 September 1939. Insulted by Franco's criticism of the Nationalist navy and of him personally, in December 1939 Moreno delivered a message to Franco personally in which he defended the navy's and his own record, expressed disappointment that the Franco regime had treated him as a failure during the later stages of the war and during its conclusion, and asked that Franco reconsider. Franco assured Moreno of his continued respect and support before ending the meeting, and they never met again.

Moreno was promoted to almirante (admiral) on 27 July 1941 and his position as captain general at Ferrol del Caudillo was confirmed on 2 August 1941. At the urging of his brother Salvador, who was minister of the navy from 1939 to 1945, Franco somewhat grudgingly awarded Moreno the Military Medal by a decree of 17 January 1942. Moreno still was serving as captain general at Ferrol del Caudillo when he died there suddenly of a heart attack at 02:00 on 21 January 1945 while reading a new biography of Napoleon Bonaparte, ending 46 years of naval service.

By a decree of 17 March 1945, Franco directed that Moreno's remains be interred at the Panteón de Marinos Ilustres (Pantheon of Illustrious Mariners) in San Fernando, Spain, with the highest honors possible, equivalent to those of a captain general in command of a fleet who dies aboard his flagship. The interment finally took place in 1952 with Moreno's brother Salvador, then serving in his second stint as minister of the navy, presiding over the service. A marble frame above his gray marble coffin frame bears the Latin inscription "OBLITUS SUI SE TOTUM CLASSI PATRIAE DEVOVIT", meaning "Forgetting himself, he dedicated himself entirely to the Navy of the Fatherland." The inscription on his tombstone, modified in 1978, so that it included his rank and titles and the statement that he "dedicated his life to the service of the Navy and Spain," read:

R. I. P. The Most Excellent Admiral of the Navy DON FRANCISCO MORENO FERNÁNDEZ, First Marquis of Alborán. He consecrated his life to the service of the Fatherland, whose glories he enhanced by maintaining the dominion of the sea against a much superior enemy in number as Commander-in-Chief of the National Fleet in the War of Liberation of Spain (1936–1939). Born in the city of San Fernando on the 7th of November 1883. Died Died in Ferrol del Caudillo on the 21st of January 1945 while serving as Captain General of the Department. The Fatherland honors his memory.

In recognition of Moreno's service to the Francoist regime, Franco posthumously granted Moreno the title of Marquis of Alborán on 1 April 1950, stipulating that the title was inheritable by his children and other legitimate successors.

=== Personal life ===
Moreno was the eldest of four siblings. His brother Salvador became an almirante (admiral) in the Spanish Navy, served as commander-in-chief of the Spanish fleet, and twice served as minister of the navy. His sister Concepción married Francisco Bastarreche, an admiral who also served in the Nationalist faction's navy. His brother Juan Antonio was a capitán de artillería (captain of artillery) who died of influenza in Larache in Spanish Morocco in 1918 during the Spanish flu pandemic.

Moreno married Antonia de Reyna y Martínez de Tejada, the daughter of a colonel of artillery, on 18 January 1911. He was the grandfather of architect Salvador Moreno Peralta and the great-grandfather of the singer-songwriter, musician, and actor Pablo Alborán.

At his death, Moreno left the draft of his unfinished memoirs. His sons, Fernando and Salvador, adapted and published them in 1959 under the title La Guerra en el Mar (The War at Sea).

== Honors and awards ==
=== Spanish honors and awards ===
- Grand Cross of Naval Merit with White Distinction (1939)
- Cross of the Royal and Military Order of Saint Hermenegild
- Grand Cross of the Royal and Military Order of Saint Hermenegild (1941)
- Knight First Class of the Order of Military Merit
- Knight Second Class of the Order of Military Merit
- Grand Cross of Military Merit with Red Distinction
- Grand Cross of Naval Merit with Red Distinction
- Knight First Class of the Order of Naval Merit with White Distinction (two awards)
- Knight Second Class (Commander) of the Order of Naval Merit with White Distinction (pensioned)
- Knight Second Class (Commander) of the Order of Naval Merit with White Distinction
- Grand Cross of Naval Merit with White Distinction
- Grand Cross of Military Merit with White Distinction (1941)
- Plate Second Class of the Naval Order of Maria Cristina
- Military Medal (two awards, one of them in 1942)
- War Cross (three awards)
- Grand Cross of the Order of Charles III (1942)
- African Campaign Medal
- Medalla de la Campaña (Campaign Medal)
- Gold Medal for Naval Marksmanship
- Coronation Medal of Alfonso XIII

=== Foreign honors and awards ===
- Knight Grand Cross of the Order of the Crown of Italy (Kingdom of Italy)
- Knight of the Order of Saints Maurice and Lazarus (Kingdom of Italy)
- Knight of the Legion of Honour (France)
- Order of the Mehdauia (Morocco)
- Order of the German Eagle (Nazi Germany)
- Officer of the Order of the Redeemer (Greece)
- Commander of the Order of the Phoenix (Greece)

== Criminal accountability and stripping of honors ==
Posthumously, Moreno was one of 35 high-ranking officials of the Franco regime indicted by the Audiencia Nacional (National Court) in a case brought in 2006 by Baltasar Garzón for crimes of illegal detention and crimes against humanity they committed during the Spanish Civil War and in the early years of the regime that followed. All of the indicted people were deceased, and therefore no convictions resulted.

In 2024 the Association for Democratic Military Memory submitted a petition to the Ministry of Defense requesting the exhumation of Moreno's remains and the removal of his commemorative plaque and tombstone from the Pantheon of Illustrious Mariners in accordance with the 2022 Democratic Memory Law. The law mandates the removal from public spaces of commemorative elements related to the Nationalist uprising, the Francoist dictatorship, and Francoist repression.

After the end of the Francoist regime, the Spanish government suppressed Moreno's posthumous title of Marquis of Alborán.
