= Antonio Azarola y Gresillón =

Spanish politician

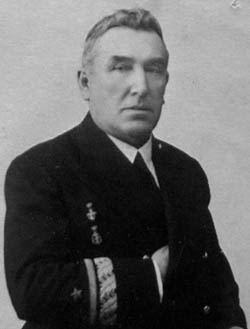
- Born: Antonio Azarola y Gresillón; 1874; Tafalla, Navarre
- Died: 4 August 1936 (aged 61–62); Executed at Ferrol, Galicia
- Burial place: Vilagarcía de Arousa cemetery
- Military career
- Allegiance: Spanish Republic
- Branch: Spanish Republican Navy
- Rank: Minister of the Navy (1935-36); Rear Admiral of the Fleet

Antonio Azarola y Gresillón (1874 – 4 August 1936) was a Spanish Navy officer, rear admiral of the Spanish Republican Navy. He was executed by firing squad on 4 August 1936 at the Ferrol Naval Base in Galicia in northwestern Spain by Nationalist navy officers for refusing to join the coup of July 1936 against the Spanish Republic that triggered the Spanish Civil War.

Antonio Azarola had been the Minister of Defence of Spain between 30 December 1935 and 19 February 1936, during Manuel Portela Valladares tenure. Along with Captain Juan Sandalio Sánchez Ferragut, commander of Cruiser Almirante Cervera, and Lieutenant Luis Sánchez Pinzón, Azarola was one of the few top naval officers who stood steadfastly loyal to the Spanish Republic at the time of the Francoist rebellion at the Ferrol Naval base.

== Biography ==
Antonio Azarola was born in Tafalla, Navarre in 1874. He belonged to a family of illustrious Spanish military men, part of which had emigrated to Uruguay. Along his early military career Azarola was named twice the adjutant of vice admiral Ricardo Fernández Gutiérrez de Celis, whose daughter, Carmen Fernández García-Zúñiga, he married. Azarola was a man of deep Christian convictions.

Azarola was second in command of the Ferrol Naval Base, the most important Spanish Navy base in northern Spain, since November 1934. He was also the commander of the Naval Arsenal.

Azarola was named undersecretary of the Naval Ministry of the Spanish Republic, Spanish: Ministerio de Marina, the bureaucratic body that governed the naval and merchant marine forces of Spain. He rose later to minister under the cabinet presided by Manuel Portela Valladares between 30 December 1935 and 19 February 1936, the last cabinet before the 1936 elections. What would be the last Naval Plan of the Spanish Republic was drawn up towards the end of his tenure in January 1936, before the Civil War. The plan envisaged the construction of two destroyers and two gunboats, as well as other minor vessels.

=== July 1936 coup ===
In the crucial hours that followed the July 1936 coup of rebel generals, Azarola made a conscious decision to remain loyal to the Spanish Republic. When the anti-Republican officers at Ferrol invited Azarola to join the rebellion he declared that his Christian principles were paramount. As the highest leader of the naval base he admonished the rebel military officers, reminding them that their rebellion was tantamount to high treason, for they had made an oath of allegiance to the legally established government of Spain.

Baffled by a situation that he could only define as an act of treason, Rear Admiral Azarola refused to open the doors of the Arsenal in order to arm the trade unions and leftist political parties, a measure which could have saved his life and could have spelled doom for the rebellion in that region. Finally he was arrested by rebel brothers Francisco and Salvador Moreno Fernández, navy officers who were lower in rank and who would be later praised as heroes by General Franco during his dictatorship. The Et tu, Brute? style words "Usted también, don Francisco" (meaning "You too, Don Francisco") spoken by Rear-Admiral Azarola at the moment of his arrest to Francisco Moreno Fernández, a former close friend of his and later admiral of the rebel fleet, have become famous.

Azarola was executed by firing squad at 6 am on 4 August against the inner wall of the Cuartel de Dolores barracks. His body was later buried at the Vilagarcía de Arousa graveyard. He was survived by his son Antonio Azarola Fernández de Celis.

Decades later Rear Admiral Azarola was included in the list of the victims of Francoism (Spanish: Listado de víctimas del franquismo) made by Spanish Judge Baltasar Garzón.

== See also ==
- Association for the Recovery of Historical Memory
- List of people executed by Francoist Spain
- Spanish coup of July 1936
- Spanish Republican Navy

== Bibliography ==
- Bruno Alonso González, La flota republicana y la guerra civil de España, Ed. Renacimiento, México 1944 ISBN 84-96133-75-3
- José Cervera, Avatares de la guerra española en el mar, Editorial Noray, 2011, ISBN 978-84-7486-237-9
- Carlos Engel Masoliver, El Cuerpo de Oficiales en la guerra de España, Ed. Quirón, ISBN 978-84-96935075
- Javier García Fernández (coord.), 25 militares de la República; "El Ejército Popular de la República y sus mandos profesionales", Ed. Ministerio de Defensa, Madrid 2011
