= Battle of Cape Machichaco =

Naval battle of the Spanish Civil War

Coordinates: 43°52′26.02″N 2°44′17.6″W

- Part of the Spanish Civil War
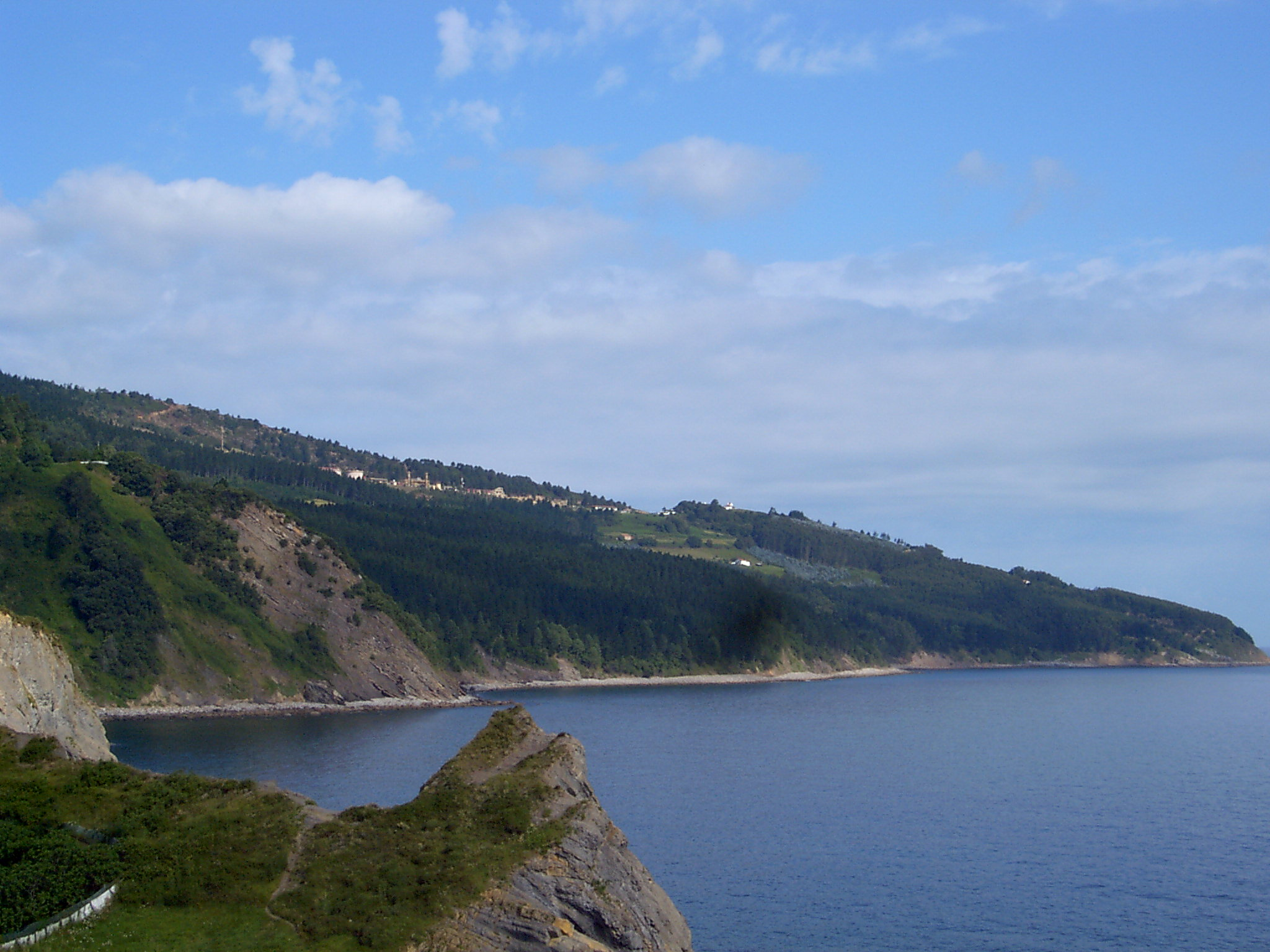
- Cape Machichaco
Date	5 March 1937
Location	Biscay, off Bermeo, Spain
Result	Nationalist victory

Belligerents
Basque Navy; Republican Navy	Nationalist Navy

Strength
4 armed trawlers; 1 transport ship	1 heavy cruiser

Casualties and losses
Casualties: 34 killed, 12 wounded; Losses: 1 armed trawler sunk; 2 armed trawlers damaged; 1 transport ship captured	Casualties: 1 killed, 1 wounded; Losses: 1 heavy cruiser damaged
- 4 civilians killed

The battle of Cape Machichaco was a naval battle which took place on 5 March 1937 off Bermeo, during the Spanish Civil War, between the Spanish Nationalist heavy cruiser Canarias and four Basque Navy trawlers escorting a Republican convoy. The trawlers were protecting the transport ship Galdames, which was sailing to Bilbao with 173 passengers.

== Prelude ==
On 4 March, four armed trawlers of the Basque Auxiliary Navy section of the Spanish Republican Navy, Bizcaya, Gipuzkoa, Donostia and Nabarra departed from Bayonne, France. Their intention was to defend Galdames's mail, passengers, machinery, weapons, supplies and 500 tons of nickel coins property of the Basque government. Canarias sailed from Ferrol with Salvador Moreno Fernández as the captain, with orders to stop the transport ship. Galdames, which was steaming up with the lights and the radio switched off, was outrun by Bizcaya and Gipuzkoa.

Next morning, while all the trawlers were watching for Canarias, Galdames rejoined them. Bizcaya's captain was Alejo Bilbao, Nabarra's Enrique Moreno Plaza from Murcia, Gipuzkoa's Manuel Galdós, and Donostia's Francisco Elortegi.

== Engagement ==
The first trawler to spot Canarias was Gipuzkoa, 30 kilometers (19 mi; 16 nmi) north of Bilbao. The Basque trawler was hit on the bridge and the forward gun. Return fire from Gipuzkoa killed one Canarias seaman and wounded another. The armed trawler, with five fatalities and 20 injured aboard, managed to approach the coast, where the shore batteries forced Canarias to retreat. Nabarra and Donostia tried to prevent Canarias from finding Galdames and engaged the cruiser.

Donostia withdrew from the battle after being fired on by Canarias, but Nabarra faced the enemy for almost two hours. She was eventually hit in the boiler and came to a stop; 20 men abandoned the sinking trawler, while other 29 were lost with the ship, including her captain, Enrique Moreno Plaza.

The transport Galdames, which was hit by a salvo from Canarias and lost four passengers, was eventually captured by the Nationalist cruiser. Gipuzkoa arrived at Portugalete seriously damaged and Bizcaya headed for Bermeo, where she assisted the Estonian merchantman Yorbrook with a load including ammunition and 42 Japanese Type 31 75 mm mountain guns, previously captured by Canarias and released. Donostia sought shelter in a French port.

== Aftermath ==
The 20 survivors from Nabarra were rescued by the Nationalists and taken aboard Canarias. Instead of the expected hostility and mistreatment, they were given medical assistance, and both the cruiser commander, future Francoist Admiral Salvador Moreno Fernández and Captain Manuel Calderón interceded with Franco when the Basque seamen were sentenced to death in retaliation for the shooting of two crewmembers of the armed trawler Virgen del Carmen, captured by Republican sympathizers and diverted to Bilbao in December 1936. The survivors were eventually acquitted and released in 1938.

In contrast, one of the passengers aboard Galdames, Christian Democrat politician Manuel Carrasco Formiguera, from Catalonia, was imprisoned and executed on 9 April 1938.

== See also ==
- List of classes of Spanish Nationalist ships of the Spanish Civil War
- Spanish Civil War Republican ship classes
- War in the North
