= Convoy de la Victoria =

Spanish naval battle during the Spanish Civil War

Coordinates: 36°04′41″N 5°23′57″W

- Part of the Spanish Civil War
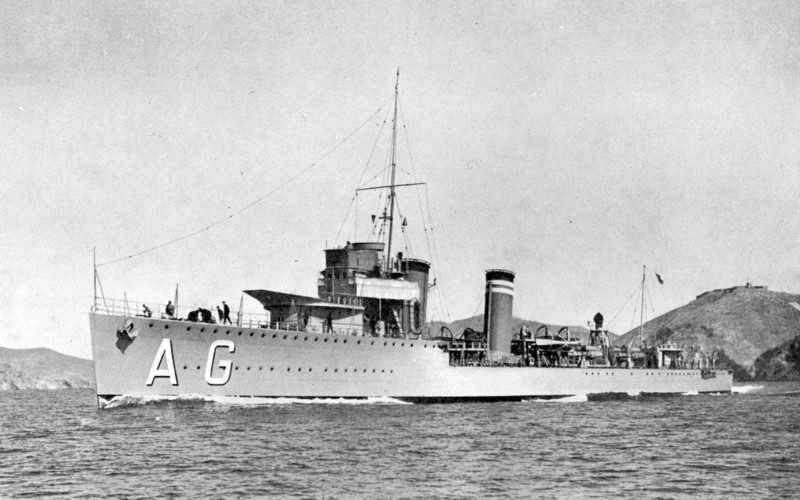
- Alcalá Galiano during sea trials
Date	5 August 1936
Location	Mediterranean Sea, near Punta Carnero
Result	Nationalist victory

Belligerents
Republican Navy	Nationalist Navy

Strength
1 destroyer	1 gunboat; 1 torpedo boat; 1 coastguard ship

Casualties and losses
None	None

The Convoy de la Victoria ("Convoy of Victory") was a Spanish naval battle on 5 August 1936 in the Strait of Gibraltar during the Spanish Civil War, between the escort of a Nationalist convoy and the Republican Navy destroyer Alcalá Galiano.

== Background ==
At the end of July 1936, the Spanish rebel forces were in dire straits. The Republic held two-thirds of the country, the capital city, the gold reserves, the major urban centers and most of the industries. The main shock force of the rebels, the Spanish Army of Africa, was isolated in Spanish Morocco, the Republic held most of the Navy, and from 19 July, Spanish Republican Navy warships were patrolling the waters between Morocco and the mainland.

With the assistance of Nazi Germany and Fascist Italy, the Nationalists managed to airlift their troops from Africa to Andalusia.

=== Airlift of troops ===
The Nationalists requested and received transport aircraft from Germany and Italy in order to transport their troops, establishing the first airlift of troops in history. Germany sent 20 Ju 52s and, between 29 July and 5 August, the Nationalists carried 1,500 men of the Spanish Army of Africa across the Strait by air, and another 15,000 between 5 and 15 August. Historian Hugh Thomas estimates 12,000 men were flown between August and September.

Hitler stated: "Franco ought to erect a monument to the glory of the Junkers-52". This success was a major psychological blow (the news of the arrival of the Moors spread terror among the Republicans), but the Republican Navy still controlled the Straits and the Republican battleship Jaime I threatened the transport aircraft with her heavy anti-aircraft fire.

== Convoy ==
On 5 August, Franco decided to break the Republican naval blockade, with a convoy of merchant ships, carrying 2,500 to 3,000 soldiers, equipment and heavy weapons. The convoy departed from Ceuta and was made up of four transports escorted by the gunboat Dato, the coastguard ship Uad Kert and the old T-1 class torpedo boat T-19. The convoy was covered by five Savoia-Marchetti SM.81 bombers, three F.VIIs, one DC-2, two NiD.52 fighters, two Do Js, and a squadron of Breguet 19s.

Three Republican destroyers were keeping a close watch on ports in Spanish Morocco, but in the morning of 5 August the Nationalist aircraft launched air attacks against the Republican vessels in the Strait and the Republican destroyer Lepanto was forced to leave Gibraltar by the British authorities. Because of this, only Alcalá Galiano engaged the Nationalist ships. The convoy, bound for Algeciras, reached its destination on the evening after a brief exchange of fire.

While mooring in Algeciras, the gunboat Dato straddled the British destroyer HMS Basilisk after misidentifying her as Republican. While steaming back to Málaga, Alcalá Galiano was attacked and hit by Nationalist aircraft. Francoist sources claim that she suffered 18 seamen killed and 28 wounded.

== Aftermath ==
From 6 August, transport ships crossed the Strait of Gibraltar, with the cover of Italian bombers. On 7 August, the battleship Jaime I and the cruiser Libertad shelled Algeciras and severely damaged Dato and Uad Kert. However, in the first week of August, a German Junkers Ju 52 (the Ju 52 is a transport aircraft, pos. modified to carry bombs ??) struck the Republican Jaime I and Italian bombers started to harass the Republican fleet so that they could no longer prevent the passage of transport ships. Furthermore, the Republican warships were inefficiently handled by their crews and two German cruisers, Deutschland and Admiral Scheer patrolled the Strait.

In addition, the British authorities in Gibraltar and Tangier were hostile to the Republic. The British oil companies in Gibraltar refused to sell fuel to the Republican navy. The Tangier International Commission denied the use of the harbor to the Republican Navy, because this was contrary to the city's neutrality, but nevertheless authorized the passage of food, goods and gasoline for the German transport planes to Spanish Morocco. By the end of September, the Republic had lost control of the waters between Morocco and the mainland after the battle of Cape Espartel.

== See also ==
- Spanish Civil War Republican ship classes
- List of classes of Spanish Nationalist ships of the Spanish Civil War

== Bibliography ==
- Beevor, A. (2006). The Battle for Spain: The Spanish Civil War, 1936–1939. London: Penguin. ISBN 9780143037651.
- Graham, H. (2005). The Spanish Civil War: A Very Short Introduction. Oxford University Press. ISBN 9780192803771.
- Jackson, G. (1967). The Spanish Republic and the Civil War, 1931–1939. Princeton University Press. ISBN 9780691007571.
- Preston, P. (2006). The Spanish Civil War: Reaction, Revolution, and Revenge. London: Harper Perennial. ISBN 9780007232079.
- Thomas, H. (2001). The Spanish Civil War. London: Penguin. ISBN 9780141011615.
