= Canarias-class cruiser =

Class of heavy cruiser of the Spanish Navy

- Canarias during the Spanish Civil War

Class overview
- Name: Canarias class
- Builders: Sociedad Española de Construcción Naval in Ferrol
- Operators: Spanish Navy
- Preceded by: Almirante Cervera class
- Succeeded by: None
- Built: 1928–1935
- In commission: 1935–1975
- Planned: 3
- Completed: 2
- Cancelled: 1
- Lost: 1
- Retired: 1

General characteristics
- Type: Heavy cruiser
- Displacement: 10,670 long tons (10,840 t) standard; 13,500 long tons (13,700 t) full load
- Length: 636 ft (194 m)
- Beam: 64 ft (20 m)
- Draught: 21 ft 5 in (6.53 m)
- Installed power: Yarrow type boilers, 90,000 hp (67,000 kW)
- Propulsion: 4 shafts, Parsons type geared turbines
- Speed: 33 knots (61 km/h)
- Range: 8,000 nmi (15,000 km) at 15 kn (28 km/h)
- Complement: 679
- Armament: 8 × 8-inch (203 mm) guns in four twin turrets; 8 × 4.7-inch (119 mm) guns; 12 × 40 mm AA guns; 3 × 20 mm AA guns; 12 × 21-inch (533 mm) torpedo tubes in triple mounts above water
- Armour: Belt 2 in (51 mm); Deck 1.5–1 in (38–25 mm); Magazine 4 in (102 mm) box around; Turret 1 in (25 mm); Conning tower 1 in (25 mm)

The Canarias class was a class of heavy cruiser of the Spanish Navy. Two ships of the class were completed in the 1930s. They were built in Spain by the Vickers-Armstrongs subsidiary Sociedad Española de Construcción Naval upon a British design, and were a modified version of the Royal Navy′s County class. The two ships completed, Canarias and Baleares, both saw service during the Spanish Civil War, the latter being sunk.

== Design ==
The ships were ordered in 1926 and were based on the British County-class cruisers. The designer was Sir Phillip Watts. These ships had anti-torpedo bulges and a slightly narrower beam as well as more powerful machinery. The boiler rooms were re-arranged compared to the British design and trunked into a single massive funnel rather than three funnels used on the British cruisers. The Spanish ships had a stronger secondary armament and although the original design included a catapult for a seaplane this was never installed.

== Ships ==
Both ships were built by SECN in Ferrol.

Ship	Launched	Completed	Fate
Canarias	28 May 1931	1936	Decommissioned 1975
Baleares	20 April 1932	1937	Sunk 6 March 1938 by Republican destroyers in the Battle of Cape Palos

A third ship was projected but not ordered.

== Service history ==
Both ships were making their final sea trials when seized by the Nationalist side in the Spanish Civil War. Both of them were fitting out and completed with makeshift fire control and secondary armament.

Canarias was the flagship of the Nationalist Navy and sank 34 ships including the Republican destroyer Almirante Ferrándiz and the Soviet merchant Komsomol. She also damaged the destroyer José Luis Díez, forcing her to seek refuge at Gibraltar. During World War II she took part in the search of survivors from the Bismarck.

Baleares was completed without 'Y' turret, which was retrofitted in 1937. In September 1937 she engaged two Republican light cruisers in the Battle of Cape Cherchell. During a raid on Palma de Majorca in March 1938 she was intercepted by Republican destroyers and torpedoed by the destroyer Lepanto. The torpedoes blew up the forward magazines, disintegrating the fore part of the ship. The stern half remained afloat and 372 of her crew of 1221 were saved by British destroyers Boreas and Kempenfelt. 786 men died during the action.

== Bibliography ==
- Chesneau, Roger, ed. (1980). Conway's All the World's Fighting Ships 1922–1946. New York: Mayflower Books. ISBN 0-8317-0303-2.
- Whitley, M. J. (1995). Cruisers of World War Two: An International Encyclopedia. London: Cassell. ISBN 1-86019-874-0.
