= Battle of Málaga (1937) =

Battle in the Spanish Civil War

Coordinates: 36.7167°N 4.4167°W

- Part of the Spanish Civil War
Date	3–8 February 1937
Location	Málaga, Spain
Result	Nationalist victory

Belligerents
(Spain) Spanish Republic	(Francoist Spain) Nationalist Spain (Fascist Italy) CTV; Germany

Commanders and leaders
(Spain) José Villalba Lacorte	(Francoist Spain) Queipo de Llano (Francoist Spain) Duke of Seville (Francoist Spain) Agustín Muñoz Grandes (Fascist Italy) Mario Roatta

Strength
12,000 to 40,000 Republican militia 16 pieces of artillery	10,000 Italian troops 10,000 Moroccan colonial troops 5,000 Requetes militia some Italian tanks 100 Italian aircraft 4 cruisers

Casualties and losses
3,000 to 5,000 killed 3,600 captured, then executed	Spanish: Unknown; Italian: 130 killed, 424 wounded

The Battle of Málaga was the culmination of an offensive in February 1937 by the combined Nationalist and Italian forces to eliminate Republican control of the province of Málaga during the Spanish Civil War. Nazi Germany was also involved through air and naval support. The participation of Moroccan regulars and especially of modern and armoured Italian forces from the recently arrived Corpo Truppe Volontarie resulted in a complete rout of the Spanish Republican Army and the capitulation of Málaga in less than a week.

== Prelude ==
After the failure to capture Madrid and the Republican counter attack at the Battle of the Corunna Road, the Nationalists sought to regain the initiative. A 25-mile wide strip of land in southern Spain along the Mediterranean Sea centering on Málaga, a base of the Spanish Republican Navy, was held by the Republicans and the arrival of Italian troops at the nearby port of Cádiz made an attack on Málaga logical.

On 17 January the campaign to conquer Málaga began when the newly constituted Army of the South under Queipo de Llano advanced from the west and soldiers led by Colonel Antonio Muñoz Jiménez attacked from the northeast. Both attacks encountered little resistance and made advances of up to 15 miles in a week. The Republicans failed to realize that the Nationalists were concentrating for an attack on Málaga and thus they remained unreinforced and unprepared for the main attack on 3 February.

== Combatants ==
=== Nationalists ===
A mixed force of 15,000 Nationalists troops (Moroccan colonial troops, Carlist militia members (Requetés)), and Italian soldiers participated in the Nationalist attack on Málaga. This force was commanded overall by Queipo de Llano. The Italians, led by Mario Roatta and known as the Blackshirts, formed nine mechanized battalions of about 5,000-10,000 soldiers and were equipped with light tanks and armored cars. In the Alboran Sea, the Canarias, Baleares and Almirante Cervera were in position to blockade and bombard Málaga, along with the German cruiser Admiral Scheer. The Nationalist forces were further backed by the air forces of the German Condor Legion.

=== Republicans ===
The Republican forces were composed of 12,000 (only 8,000 armed) to 40,000 Andalusian militiamen of the National Confederation of Labour (Confederación Nacional del Trabajo, or CNT). Although large in number and high in spirit, the militiamen were completely unprepared for military warfare and there was strong antagonism between CNT and communist militiamen. In addition, they lacked the weapons to sustain a successful defense against the modern weapons of the Italians. Malaga lacked anti-aircraft defenses, the militiamen did not build trenches or road blocks and there was a lack of ammunition.

Nationalist assault on Malaga

== Battle ==
The Army of the South initiated the assault of Málaga from the west at Ronda on 3 February. Attacking from the north on the night of 4 February, the Italian Blackshirts achieved a massive breakthrough because of the Republicans being unprepared for armoured warfare. The Nationalists continued a steady advance towards Málaga and by 6 February had reached the heights around the city. Fearing encirclement, the Republican commander, Colonel Villalba, ordered the evacuation of Málaga. On 8 February Queipo de Llano and the Army of the South entered a bleak and barren Málaga.

== Aftermath ==
=== Nationalist repression ===
The Republicans who could not escape Málaga were either shot or imprisoned. After the fall of Malaga, the Nationalists executed 4,000 Republicans only in the city itself. Thousands of Republican refugees fled from the city along the coast, many of them died. The Nationalists caught up with the fleeing Republicans on the road to Almería and shot the men, but let the women continue so as to put the burden of feeding them on the Republican government. Paul Preston said: "The crowds of refugees who blocked the road out of Malaga had been in an inferno. They were shelled from the sea, bombed from the air and then machine-gunned. The scale of the repression inside the fallen city explained why they were ready to run the gauntlet."

=== Political and military consequences ===
The devastating defeat suffered by the Republicans caused the Communists in the Valencia government to force the resignation on 20 February of General Asensio Torrado, the Under Secretary of War. Francisco Largo Caballero replaced him with the editor of Claridad and a man without a military background, Carlos de Baráibar.

Benito Mussolini saw the spectacular success of the Italian troops as reason to continue and increase the Italian involvement in Spain despite having agreed to the Non-Intervention Agreement. Plans to capture Valencia were abandoned in order to achieve a decisive victory by attacking and capturing Madrid.

== Koestler Depiction ==
An eye-witness depiction of the Battle of Málaga is given by Arthur Koestler in both his 1937 Dialogue with Death and the 1953 The Invisible Writing. Koestler had gone to Malaga as a journalist writing for the British News Chronicle and actually also for the propaganda department of the Comintern. At the city's fall he was captured by Nationalist forces and narrowly avoided being put to death out of hand, thanks largely to the intervention of Sir Peter Chalmers Mitchell. A full account is given in Mitchell's memoir, My House in Málaga, published in 1938.

== See also ==
- List of Spanish Nationalist military equipment of the Spanish Civil War
- List of weapons of the Corpo Truppe Volontarie
- List of Spanish Republican military equipment of the Spanish Civil War
