= Battle of Cape Spartel (1936) =

Naval battle of the Spanish Civil War

Coordinates: 36°14′47″N 4°38′30″W

- Part of the Spanish Civil War
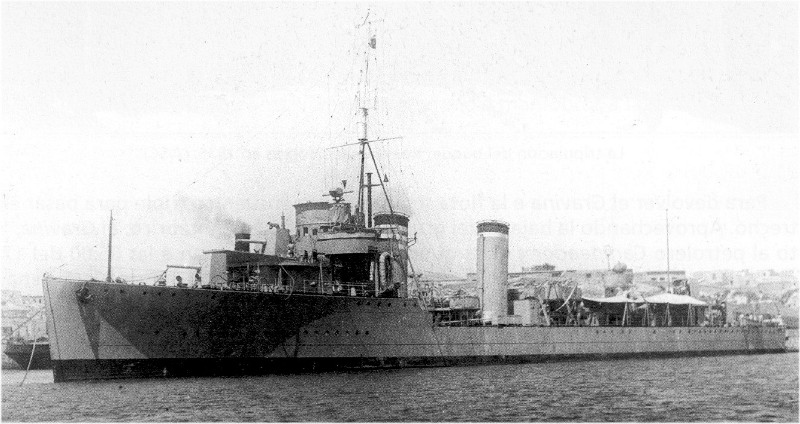
- Republican destroyer Gravina
Date	29 September 1936
Location	Cape Spartel, near Tangier, present-day Morocco
Result	Nationalist victory

Belligerents
(Spain) Spanish Republic	(Francoist Spain) Nationalist Spain

Commanders and leaders
Fernando Navarro Capdevila	Francisco Moreno Fernández

Strength
2 destroyers	1 heavy cruiser 1 light cruiser

Casualties and losses
1 destroyer sunk 1 destroyer damaged	None

The Battle of Cape Spartel (Cabo Espartel in Spanish) was a naval battle of the Spanish Civil War that broke the Republican naval blockade of the Strait of Gibraltar, securing the maritime supply route to Spanish Morocco for the Nationalists early in the war. The action occurred on 29 September 1936 between two Nationalist cruisers and two Republican destroyers.

== Background ==
The rebels at Ferrol, Galicia, had been able to seize the city's naval base in July 1936, but at a large cost: over 30 mutinous officers had been shot dead by hundreds of sailors loyal to the Republic.

Their prize included the old battleship España (formerly Alfonso XIII), the cruiser Almirante Cervera, the unfinished Canarias and Baleares, an older cruiser undergoing repairs (Navarra), one destroyer, and a number of torpedo boats and sloops. In September, a small squadron, including Almirante Cervera and Canarias, steamed from Ferrol to engage the Republican navy.

At the start of the war, the Spanish Republican Navy had the battleship Jaime I, three light cruisers, 14 destroyers, plus five submarines. In addition to España, the two cruisers and one destroyer taken by the Nationalists, by the following year they had completed Baleares and Canarias. They also had purchased four destroyers and two submarines from Fascist Italy. The Nationalists established a blockade of the Republican-held coastline for the entire duration of the war, but their paucity of ships limited the blockade's effectiveness.

== The battle ==
The Nationalists engaged a squadron of Republican destroyers stationed on the western end of the Straits shortly after 6:30 am. The destroyer Gravina was deployed near Cape Spartel, while her sister ship Almirante Ferrándiz was patrolling off Ceuta. A fierce exchange of fire followed, during which the destroyer Almirante Ferrándiz was chased and eventually sunk by Canarias in the Alboran Sea after a 40-minute engagement, while Gravina was pursued and hit twice by Almirante Cervera along the Atlantic coast of Morocco. The main guns of Canarias found their mark at a range of 11 nautical miles (20 km; 13 mi) with their second salvo, while those of Almirante Cervera performed poorly. The surviving Republican destroyer retreated toward Casablanca. Almirante Ferrándiz, having been hit six times, blew up and sank 18 nautical miles (33 km; 21 mi) south of Calaburras. Thirty-one seamen from Almirante Ferrándiz were rescued by Canarias, while the French liner Koutubia picked up another 26, including her commander, José Luis Barbastro Jiménez. This action was decisive to open the Straits to the insurgents' shipping.

== See also ==
- List of classes of Spanish Nationalist ships of the Spanish Civil War
- Spanish Civil War Republican ship classes
- Convoy de la victoria
