= List of Spanish Republican military equipment of the Spanish Civil War =

This is a list of military equipment of the Spanish Republicans. The Soviet Union was the main provider of Republican military equipment.

== Weapons ==
- List of Spanish Civil War weapons of the Republicans

== Aircraft ==
- List of aircraft of the Spanish Republican Air Force

== Ships ==
- Spanish Civil War Republican ship classes
