= List of classes of Spanish Nationalist ships of the Spanish Civil War =

This is a list of ship classes the Spanish Nationalists used during the Spanish Civil War (1936–1939).

== Battleships ==
- España-class battleship — One ship, España (formerly Alfonso XIII), seized by the Nationalists at the start of the war.

== Cruisers ==
=== Heavy Cruisers ===
- Canarias-class heavy cruisers — These two ships, Canarias and Baleares, were built as modified County-class cruisers, and the Nationalists seized both of them at the start of the war.

=== Light Cruisers ===
- Almirante Cervera-class light cruiser — Built as modified Emerald-class cruiser. The Nationalists seized the lead ship of the class, Almirante Cervera, at the start of the war.
- Navarra — A unique light cruiser which resembled a modified British World War I-era Town-class cruiser. Seized by the Nationalists at the start of the war.

== Destroyers ==
- Alsedo-class destroyer — The Nationalists seized one ship of the class, Velasco, at the beginning of the war.
- Churruca-class destroyer — The Nationalists sank one ship of the class, Ciscar, then refloated her, and she saw service with them towards the end of the war.
- Vifor-class destroyers–Units of a four-ship class Romania ordered from shipyards in Italy which Italy seized for use as scout cruisers during World War I. Italy transferred two of the ships to Romania in 1920, but kept the other two (Falco and Aquila), and Fascist Italy sold them to the Nationalists in 1937. The Nationalists classified them as destroyers and renamed them Ceuta and Melilla, respectively. Called the Ceuta class in Spain.
- Alessandro Poerio-class scout cruisers– A class of Italian World War I scout cruisers which Italy later reclassified as destroyers. The Nationalists purchased two of them, Alessandro Poerio and Guglielmo Pepe, in 1937 and renamed them Huesca and Teruel, respectively. Called the Huesca class in Spain.

== Auxiliary cruisers ==
- List of auxiliary and merchant cruisers

== Submarines ==
- Archimede-class submarine — Bought from Italy and called the General Mola class in Spain.)
- Perla-class submarine — Two ships Italy lent to the Nationalists for a period.
