= Spanish destroyer José Luis Díez =

Military ship

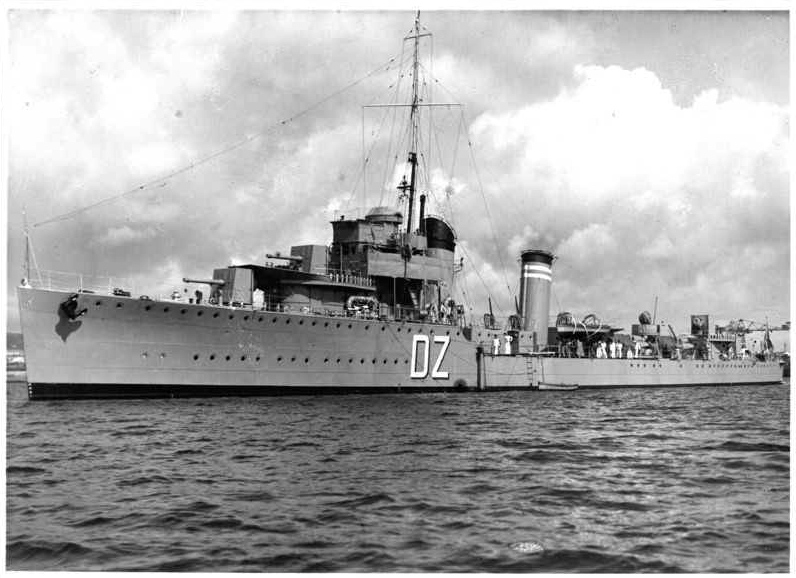
- Destroyer José Luis Diez

History

Spain
- Name: José Luis Díez
- Namesake: José Luis Díez y Pérez Muñoz
- Builder: SECN, Naval Dockyard, Cartagena, Spain
- Launched: 25 August 1928
- Completed: 1929
- Commissioned: 1929
- Decommissioned: 1965
- Identification: JD
- Nickname(s): Pepe el del puerto
- Fate: Scrapped in 1965

General characteristics
- Class & type: Churruca-class destroyer
- Displacement: 1,650 tons (normal); 2,067 tons (maximum)
- Length: 101 m (331 ft 4 in)
- Beam: 9.6 m (31 ft 6 in)
- Height: 6.02 m (19 ft 9 in)
- Draught: 3.3 m (10 ft 10 in)
- Installed power: 4 Yarrow boilers; 42,000 hp (31,000 kW)
- Propulsion: 2 Parsons turbines
- Speed: 36 knots (67 km/h)
- Range: 5,000 nautical miles (9,300 km) at 10 knots (19 km/h); 3,100 nautical miles (5,700 km) at 14 knots (26 km/h)
- Complement: 160
- Armament: 5 × 120 mm (4.7 in) L45 (5x1); 1 × 76 mm (3 in) anti-aircraft gun; 4 × machineguns; 6 × 533 mm (21 in) torpedo tubes (2x3); 2 × depth charge racks

José Luis Díez was a Churruca-class destroyer in the Spanish Republican Navy, in the Basque Auxiliary Navy (Spanish: Marina de Guerra Auxiliar de Euzkadi, Basque: Eusko Itsas Gudarostea) section. She took part in the Spanish Civil War on the government side.

She was named after Ship-of-the-Line Lieutenant (Spanish Teniente de navío) José Luis Díez y Pérez Muñoz.

== Civil War ==
The ship sailed into Biscay in 1936 and was anchored off Santurce for some time. She received the nickname Pepe el del puerto ("Joe of the harbor"), for her perceived inactivity.

On 20 April 1937, she was involved in a friendly fire incident when her anti-aircraft guns shot down flying ace Felipe del Río's Polikarpov I-15. The gunners mistook the aircraft for a German fighter.

On 31 May of the same year, the Police and the Marina de Guerra Auxiliar de Euzkadi took control of José Luis Díez and Císcar. At the request of the Republican government, the ships embarked more than 200 sailors of the auxiliary navy from Euzkadi to replace their original crews, who had been deemed untrustworthy. The ships were eventually returned to their original crews.

On 10 June 1937, Císcar, under the command of Alférez de Navío Juan Antonio Castro and José Luis Díez commanded by Ship-of-the-Line Lieutenant (Spanish Teniente de navío) Evaristo Lopez engaged the cruiser Almirante Cervera (Capitán de navío Manuel Moreu). The result was inconclusive.

José Luis Díez and Císcar left Bilbao on 15 June 1937, heading for France. They were loaded with refugees and several civilian and military personalities, shortly before the Nationalists entered Bilbao. Both ships went on to Santander, and after its fall, to Gijón. José Luis Díez then took refuge in Falmouth, England where, among others, the commander, the engine room chief and the navigator deserted. Subsequently, the destroyer sailed to Le Havre, France.

She then used her strong resemblance to a British destroyer as part of a ruse in an attempt to break the blockade of the Gibraltar Strait and return to the Mediterranean Sea in June 1938. During the trip, she sank two Nationalist-flagged trawlers. The ship was painted with the pennant number of HMS Grenville and used the Royal Navy flag, but she was intercepted by the heavy cruiser Canarias and other ships. After two frustrated attempts, she was badly hit and forced into Gibraltar on 29 August 1938, where she underwent repairs while looking for an opportunity to try again.

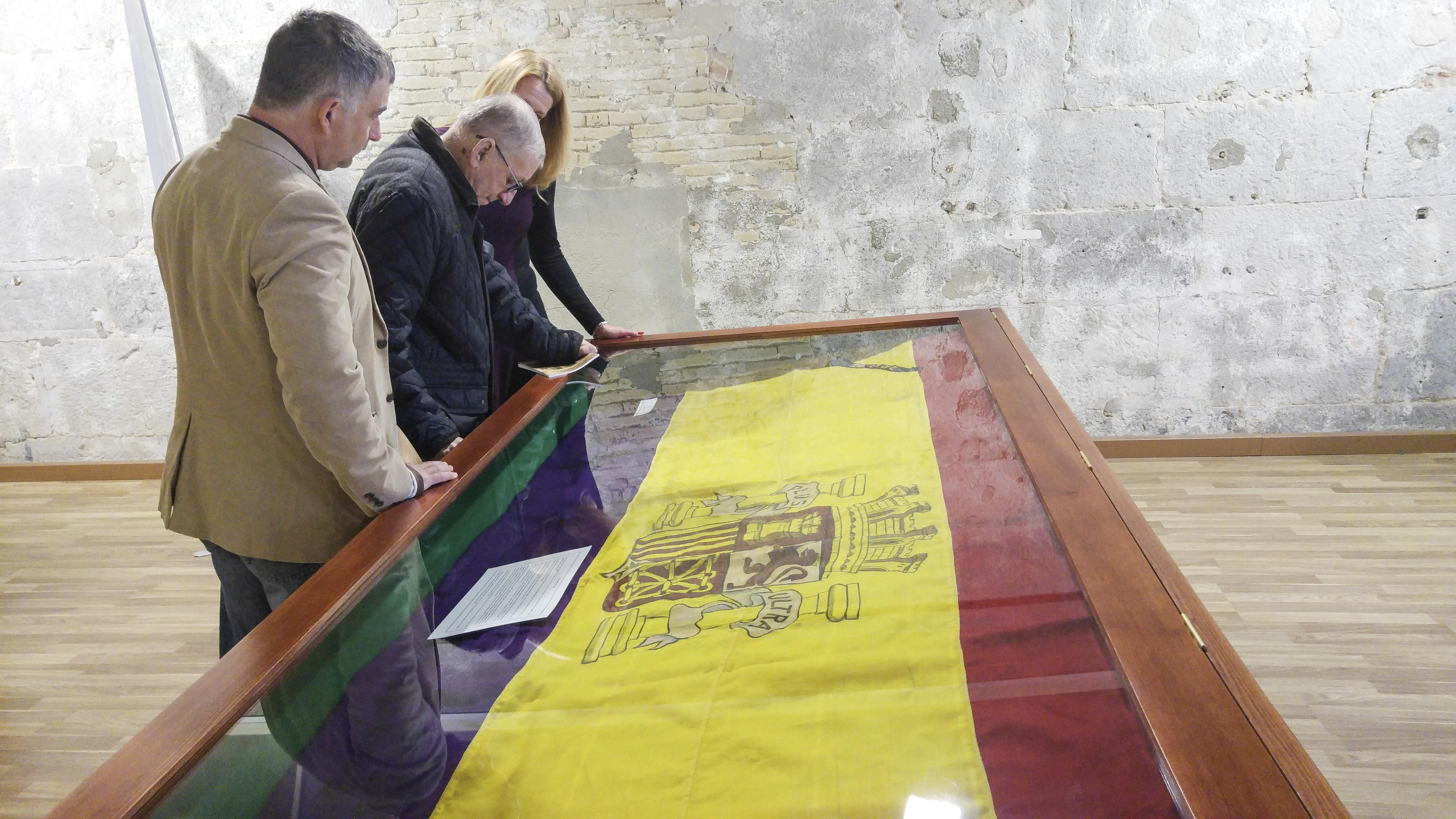
The ship flag was given by its commander, in gratefulness for their help, to the TGWU union. It is kept in the Gibraltar Museum.

The governor of Gibraltar did not want to intern the ship or to expel it. The working class of Gibraltar, sympathetic to the Republican cause, wanted it repaired and allowed to put to sea. The Republican consul Francisco Barnés Salinas had difficulty obtaining permission from the British authorities for the sailors to disembark, which was only allowed under tight restrictions, and repairs had to be made clandestinely. On the night of 29/30 December, she left Gibraltar prepared for a new attempt, but was spotted by the gunboat Calvo Sotelo. A close-range battle ensued between the destroyer and several rebel ships, including the gunboat-minelayer Vulcano. She was beached at Catalan Bay in Gibraltar to avoid being sunk or captured. The crew were returned to the Republican side by the British government.

== Post-Civil War ==
In March 1939, after recognising Franco's government as the legitimate authority of Spain, the British government, delivered the ship to the Nationalists. She was taken back by the gunboat Calvo Sotelo.

José Luis Díez was decommissioned and scrapped in 1965.

== Sources ==
- Alberca, Julio Ponce (2014-11-20). Gibraltar and the Spanish Civil War, 1936-39: Local, National and International Perspectives. Bloomsbury Publishing. ISBN 978-1-4725-3108-7.
- García, José Manuel Solloso (2007). "El destructor José Luis Díez: "Pepe de los Muelles" (1927-1965)". Cartagena Histórica Cuaderno Monográfico (in Spanish) (18). Cartagena histórica: 36–46. ISSN 1696-991X.
- Dionisio García Flórez (2002). Buques de la Guerra Civil Española. Destructores (Spanish Civil War Ships, destroyers) (in Spanish). Library. ISBN 84-932284-7-8.
- Hugh Thomas (2001). The Spanish Civil War. Modern Library. ISBN 0-375-75515-2.
