= Basque Auxiliary Navy =

Basque Auxiliary Navy Marina de Guerra Auxiliar de Euzkadi Eusko Itsas Gudarostea
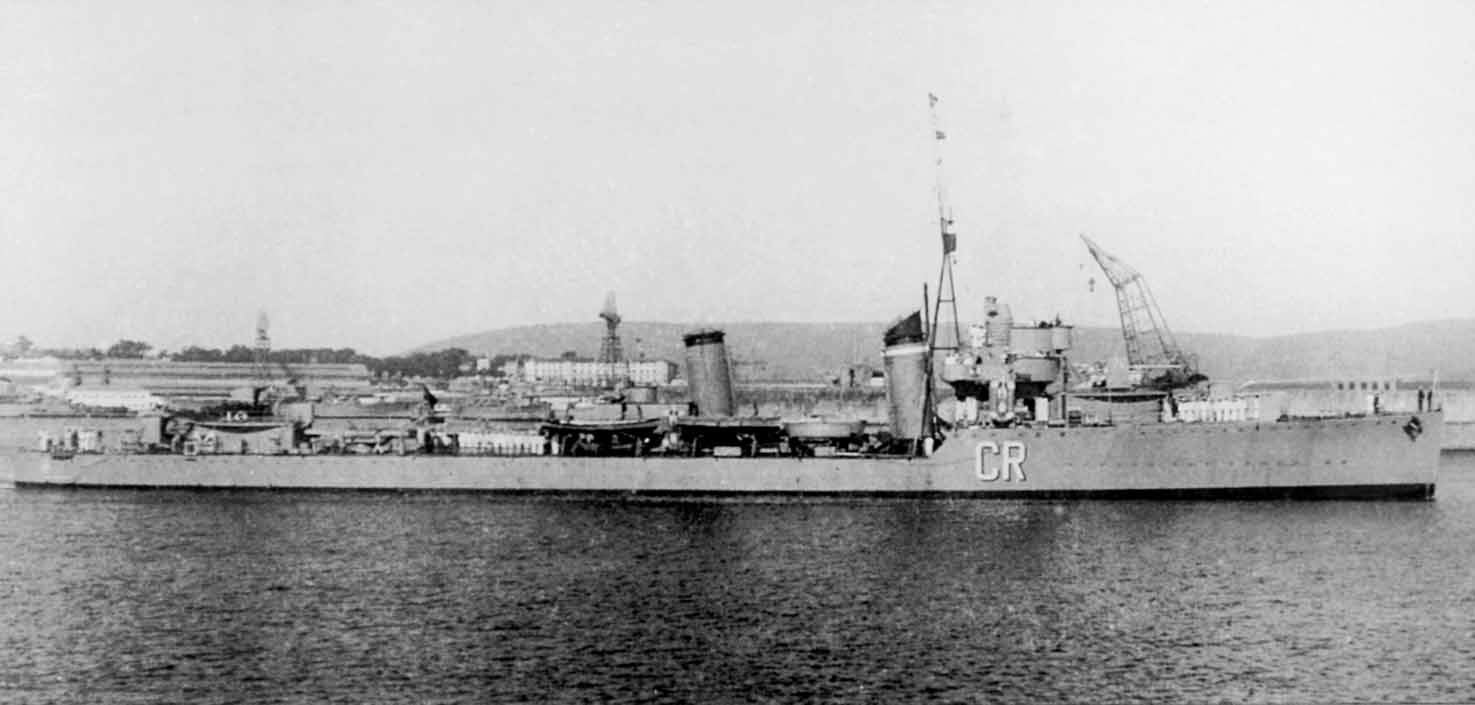
- Churruca-class destroyer Císcar incorporated into the Basque Auxiliary Navy
- Active: 1936–1937
- Country: Spain
- Branch: Spanish Republican Navy
- Type: Navy
- Role: Coastal defence and minesweeping
- Engagements: Spanish Civil War

Commanders
- Commander: Joaquín de Eguía y Unzueta

Insignia
- Naval ensign

- Naval jack

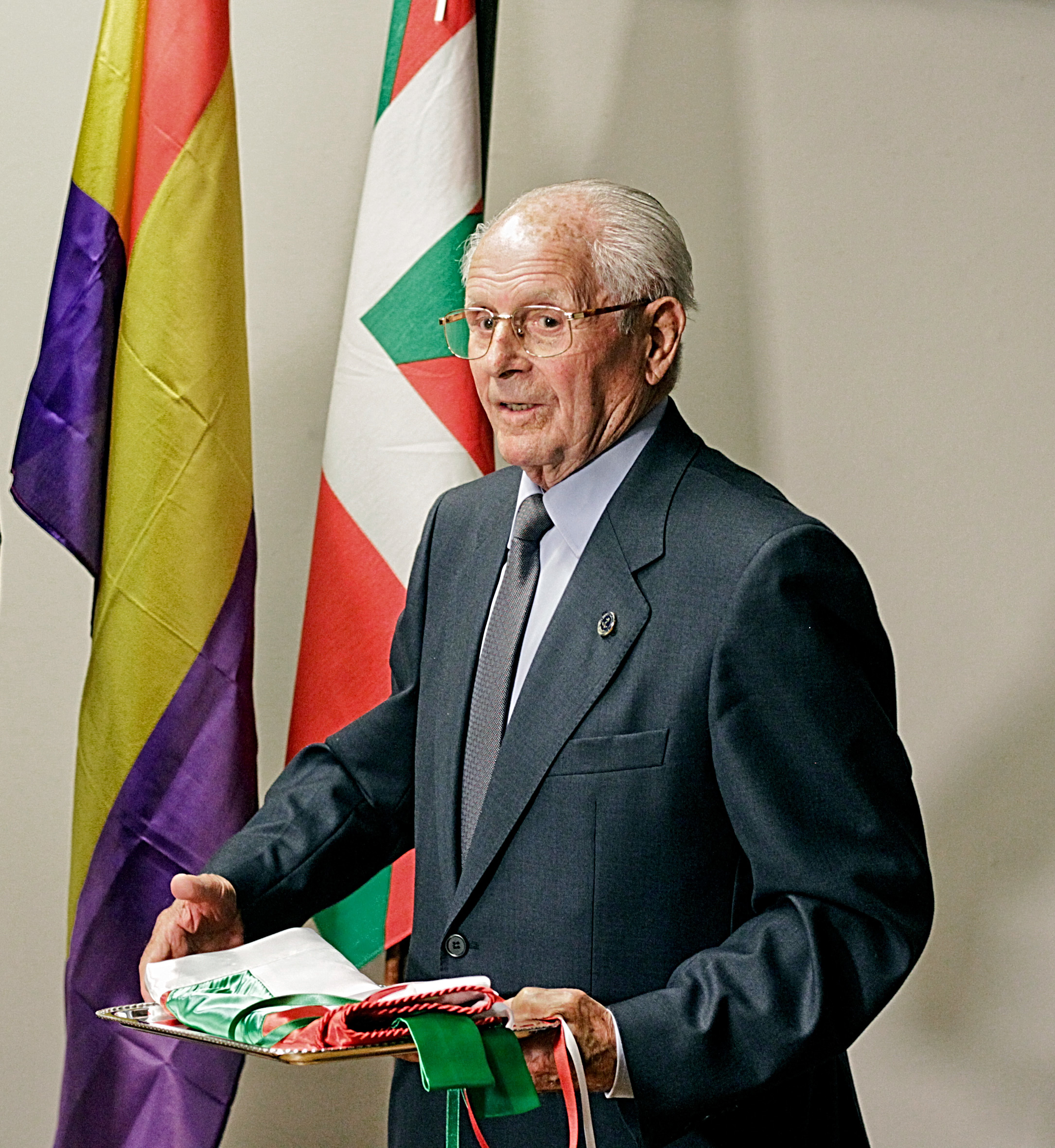
Juan Azkarate, last surviving member of the Basque Auxiliary Navy, in 2016

The Basque Auxiliary Navy (Spanish: Marina de Guerra Auxiliar de Euzkadi, Basque: Eusko Itsas Gudarostea) was a section of the Spanish Republican Navy operating in the Bay of Biscay between 1936 and 1937. The naval force began their operations in October 1936 at the behest of the autonomous Basque Government. The main Basque Navy base was at Portugalete.

== History ==
During the Spanish Civil War, the Second Spanish Republic had allowed an autonomous government in those Basque areas of Spain that had not been taken by the Nationalist faction, like Biscay and parts of Gipuzkoa.

The coast of Galicia, along with the Ferrol naval headquarters, became part of rebel-held territory early in the Spanish Civil War. When the Republican Navy became mainly confined to the Mediterranean Sea, after the failure of the blockade of the Gibraltar Strait, its operations in the Bay of Biscay were taken over by the Basque Auxiliary Navy.

Basque Auxiliary Navy ships engaged mainly in minesweeping operations. They also played a key role in the evacuation of civilians who fled as the rebel armies advanced from coastal cities such as Gijón and Santander.

The first naval action against Francoist forces took place on 15 November 1936, when the Nationalist destroyer Velasco attempted to intercept the armed trawlers Gipuzkoa and Bizcaia (still under their peacetime names of Mistral and Euzkal-Erría). The trawlers were steaming for Biarritz, France, to escort a freighter when they were spotted by the warship 40 miles off Pasaia. In the ensuing battle, Velasco was hit and limped away, while Gipuzkoa received some damage on her forecastle, with two seamen wounded.

There was another encounter with Velasco on 8 January 1937, when the rebel destroyer was laying mines along with the auxiliary minelayer Genoveva Fierro off Portugalete. After a brief exchange of fire, the Nationalist warships withdrew without accomplishing their mission. The Francoist navy, however, didn't give up and nine days later they set up a minefield successfully. On 17 January the Basque armed trawler Goizeko Izarra struck one of the mines and sank with all her crew of 17 aboard. The following day, while clearing the minefield, the minesweeper Mari-Toya hit another mine and also sank; six men of her crew were lost. Two days later, after the intense work of other minesweepers, the area was declared safe. In February and April, the Nationalist navy laid down two new minefields off Bilbao, but the Basque navy neutralized the devices. The minesweepers disabled more than 200 naval mines during the campaign.

The Basque auxiliary navy became a player in a series of maritime incidents between the Spanish Republic and Nazi Germany, when in December 1936 the German freighters Pluto and Palos were captured by the armed trawler Bizcaia. Pluto was released, but the Palos, which was carrying military supplies to the rebels, was taken to Bilbao, where her cargo was confiscated.

The largest engagement involving the Basque navy was the Battle of Cape Machichaco, on 5 March 1937, when four naval trawlers escorting the transport ship Galdames. The armed trawlers Bizcaia, Gipuzkoa, Donostia and Nabarra tried to lure the rebel heavy cruiser Canarias to a point within firing range of the coastal batteries. The operation was unsuccessful, ending with the sinking of Nabarra, Gipuzkoa's bridge shot way, and the other two trawlers scattered. The transport was eventually captured by Canarias. Gipuzkoa finally arrived at Portugalete in flames and Bizcaia headed for Bermeo, where she met the Estonian merchantman Yorbrook, previously captured by the Canarias, and forced her to make port. Donostia sought shelter in France.

On 1 May 1937, Donostia, Bizcaia and Gipuzkoa shelled the port of Bermeo, which had fallen to Italian Fascist troops the day before.

The Basque Auxiliary Navy was still operational after the fall of Bilbao in June 1937, moving away from Basque waters and setting its base in Santoña and Santander. Later, as the republic also lost those harbors, it operated off Asturias, the last Republican province in North-West Spain. Finally, following the occupation of Asturias by the Francoist armies in October 1937, the Basque Auxiliary Navy ceased its operations. Some Basque sailors became prisoners, but most of them were able to reach France.

== Naval units of the Basque Auxiliary Navy ==
=== Naval trawlers ===
The naval trawlers were usually cod fishing vessels, known in Spanish as bous, fitted with pieces of artillery. The Donostia was the former Nationalist unit Virgen del Carmen, which changed sides after being captured and diverted to Bilbao by some members of her own crew on 6 December 1936.

- Araba
  Displacement: 1,190 tn
  Armament: 1 x 101.2mm Vickers, 2 x 8mm Schwarzlose
  Complement: 50
- Bizkaya
  Displacement: 1,190 tn
  Armament: 2 x 101.2mm Vickers, 2 x 8mm Schwarzlose
  Complement: 50
- Donostia
  Displacement: 287 tn
  Armament: 1 x 76.2mm Vickers, 1 x 47mm, 2 x 8mm Schwarzlose
  Complement: 30
- Gipuzkoa
  Displacement: 1,251 tn
  Armament: 2 x 101.2mm Vickers, 2 x 8mm Schwarzlose
  Complement: 50
- Goizeko Izarra
  Displacement: 136 tn
  Armament: 1 x 57mm
  Complement: 18
- Iparreko Izarra
  Displacement: 136 tn
  Armament: 1 x 57mm, 1 x 8mm Schwarzlose
  Complement: 18
- Nabarra
  Displacement: 1,204 tn
  Armament: 2 x 101.2mm Vickers, 2 x 8mm
  Complement: 50

=== Destroyers ===
- José Luis Díez
- Císcar

=== Minesweepers ===
- Jaimin
- Rafael Cantos
- Mari-Toya
- Mº Angeles (D-1)
- Julito (D-2)
- Domayo (D-3 o Napartarra)
- Mourisca (D-4 o Arabarra)
- Gure Artizar (D-5)
- Gure Izarra (D-6)
- Alque (D-7)
- Alcion (D-8)
- Nuevo o Constante (D-9)
- Constante o Barreiro (D-10)
- Arco (D-11)
- Iris (D-12)
- Motriko (D-13)
- Ondarroa (D-14)
- Eduardito (D-15)
- Anthon Mari (D-16)
- Marcos (D-17)
- Delfina (D-18)
- Ibai-Ederra (D-19)
- Salvadora (D-20)
- Nazareno Nº6 (D-21)
- Aralarko Mikel Deuna (D-22)
- Eugenio (D-23)
- Julia (D-24)

=== Motorboats ===
- Nazareno Nº1 (L-1)
- Angel de la guarda (L-2)
- Josuren Ama (L-3)
- Nazareno Nº9 (L-4)
- San Isidro (L-5)
- San Ignacio de Loyola (L-6)

=== Auxiliary vessels ===
- Trintxerpe
- Danak-Ondo
- Danak-Batian
- Marce

=== Yachts ===
- Severiano Asarta
- Izaro/Epailla 5

== See also ==
- Spanish Republican Navy
- Battle of Cape Machichaco
- List of foreign ships wrecked or lost in the Spanish Civil War
