= Spanish destroyer Almirante Ferrándiz (1928) =

Spanish Republican Navy warship

Coordinates: 36°14′47″N 4°38′30″W

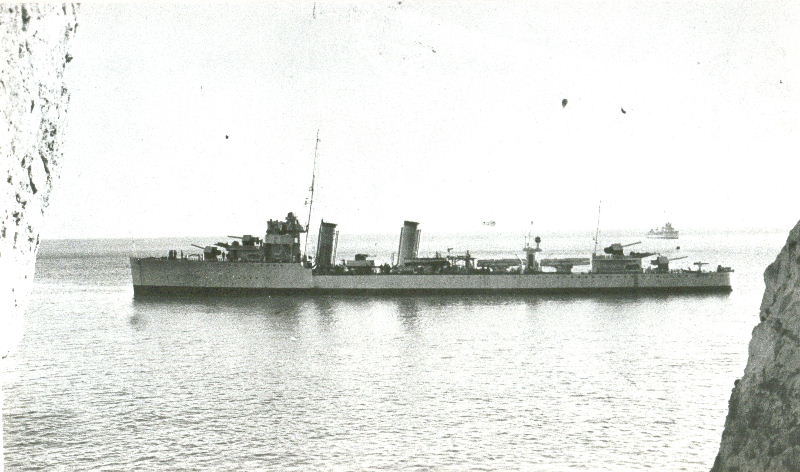
- Spanish destroyer Almirante Ferrándiz

History

Spain
- Name: Almirante Ferrandiz
- Namesake: José Ferrándiz y Niño
- Builder: SECN, Naval Dockyard, Cartagena, Spain
- Launched: 21 May 1928
- Completed: 1929
- Commissioned: 1929
- Decommissioned: 1936
- Fate: Sunk by the Spanish Nationalist cruiser Canarias, 1936

General characteristics
- Class & type: Churruca-class destroyer
- Displacement: 1,650 tons (normal); 2,067 tons (maximum)
- Length: 101 m (331 ft 4 in)
- Beam: 9.6 m (31 ft 6 in)
- Draught: 3.3 m (10 ft 10 in)
- Installed power: 4 Yarrow boilers; 42,000 hp (31,000 kW)
- Propulsion: 2 Parsons turbines
- Speed: 36 knots (67 km/h)
- Range: 5,000 nautical miles (9,300 km) at 10 knots (19 km/h); 3,100 nautical miles (5,700 km) at 14 knots (26 km/h)
- Complement: 160
- Armament: 5 × 120 mm (4.7 in) L45 (5x1); 1 × 76 mm (3 in) anti-aircraft gun; 4 × machineguns; 6 × 533 mm (21 in) torpedo tubes (2x3); 2 × depth charge racks

Almirante Ferrándiz was a Churruca-class destroyer in the Spanish Republican Navy. She took part in the Spanish Civil War on the government side.

She was named in honor of José Ferrándiz y Niño, a Spanish Admiral and former Navy Minister.

== History ==
Almirante Ferrándiz took part in the Gibraltar Strait blockade. When a Republican squadron penetrated the Cantabrian Sea to relieve Republican troops isolated in the north, she remained in the strait with Gravina to stop any movement of Nationalist troops between Africa and the Iberian peninsula.

In response, the Nationalist heavy cruiser Canarias (which Republicans believed had been damaged by an aerial bomb) and the light cruiser Almirante Cervera were sent to break the blockade.

On 29 September 1936, at the Battle of Cape Spartel, Canarias spotted Almirante Ferrándiz on patrol in the Alboran Sea, and opened fire from 16 kilometres (8.6 nmi), hitting the destroyer with her second salvo. The Republican destroyer continued sailing away from Canarias, but the heavy cruiser struck her again with a third salvo, at 20 km (11 nmi). The destroyer took a total of six hits from Canarias's 200 mm (8 in) main armament and sank 33 km (18 nmi) off Calaburras with most of her crew. Canarias stopped to rescue 31 sailors from Almirante Ferrándiz and authorized the French liner Koutubia to pick up another 26, including her commander, José Luis Barbastro Jiménez.
