= Spanish Civil War Republican ship classes =

Spanish Civil War Republican ship classes is a list of ship classes used by the Spanish Republicans during the Spanish Civil War.

== Battleships ==
- España-class battleship - Republicans had one ship of the Jaime I class which they acquired at the start of the conflict.

== Cruisers ==
- Almirante Cervera-class cruiser - Spanish Republican Navy operated two ships of the Class Libertad and Miguel de Cervantes.
- Blas de Lezo-class cruiser - Spanish Republican Navy operated one ship of class Méndez Núñez.

== Destroyers ==
- Churruca-class destroyer (1927) - All ships of this Class served in the Spanish Republican Navy at some time during the Spanish Civil War.
- Alsedo-class destroyer - Two ships of this Class served with the Republicans Alsedo and Lazaga.

== Auxiliary cruisers ==
- List of auxiliary and merchant cruisers

== Submarines ==
- List of submarines of the Spanish Navy
- Spanish B-class submarine
- Spanish C-class submarine (Example Spanish submarine C-3)
