= Spanish cruiser Almirante Cervera =

Almirante Cervera-class cruiser

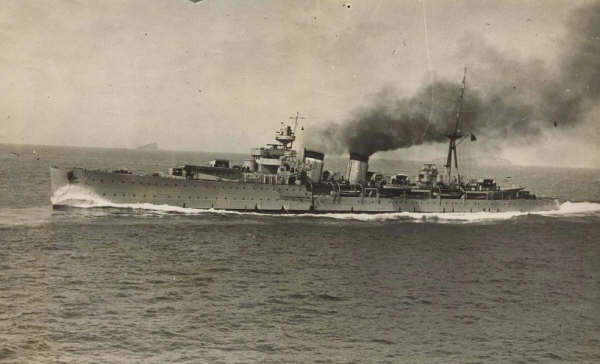
- Cruiser Almirante Cervera

History

Spain
- Name: Almirante Cervera
- Namesake: Admiral Pascual Cervera y Topete
- Laid down: 14 April 1923
- Launched: 16 October 1925
- Commissioned: 15 September 1928
- Decommissioned: 31 August 1965
- Nickname(s): Chulo del Cantábrico
- Fate: Scrapped 1966

General characteristics
- Class & type: Almirante Cervera-class cruiser
- Displacement: 7,475 long tons (7,595 t) standard; 9,237 long tons (9,385 t) full load
- Length: 579 ft (176 m)
- Beam: 54 ft (16 m)
- Draught: 16 ft 6 in (5.03 m)
- Installed power: 8 Yarrow-type boilers, 80,000 hp (60,000 kW)
- Propulsion: 4 shafts, Parsons-type geared turbines
- Speed: 33 knots (61 km/h; 38 mph)
- Complement: 566
- Armament: As built; 8 × 6-inch (152 mm) Vickers-Carraca guns in 3 twin turrets and 2 single mountings; 4 × 4-inch (102 mm) AA guns; 2 × 47 mm (1.9 in) Hotchkiss 3-pdr light AA guns; 12 × 21-inch (533 mm) torpedoes in triple tubes above water; 1940s refit; 8 × 6-inch (152 mm) Vickers-Carraca guns in 3 twin turrets and 2 single mountings; 4 × 105 mm (4.1 in) AA guns; 4 × 37 mm (1.5 in) SK C/30 AA guns; 4 × 20 mm Flakvierling 38 AA guns; 12 × 21-inch (533 mm) torpedoes in triple tubes above water
- Armour: Belt 3–2 in (76–51 mm); Deck 1–2 in (25–51 mm); Conning tower 6 in (152 mm)

Almirante Cervera was a light cruiser and lead ship of the Almirante Cervera class of the Spanish Navy. She was named after the Spanish admiral Pascual Cervera y Topete, commander of the Spanish naval forces in Cuba during the Spanish–American War. She was part of the Spanish Republican Navy between 1931 and 1936, year in which she became a key player of the Nationalist Fleet in the Spanish Civil War.

== Features ==
Her construction was authorized by the so-called Miranda law of 17 February 1915. The cruiser was launched in Ferrol in 1925 and scrapped in 1965. The ship was 172.62 metres (566 ft 4 in) in length, 16.61 metres (54 ft 6 in) in beam, and a draught of 5.03 metres (16 ft 6 in). Equipped with a main armament of eight guns of 152 mm (6 in), mounted in three twin turrets and two single mountings, and crewed by a complement of 566, Almirante Cervera belonged to the same class of two other cruisers of the Spanish Navy of her time, Galicia (Libertad from 1931 to 1939) and Miguel de Cervantes.

== Operational history ==
=== Civil War ===
==== Blockade of Northern Spain ====
Starting in October 1934, Almirante Cervera participated in the bombardment of coastal targets during the insurrection in Asturias, but it was at the time of the civil war where she took a leading role in naval operations. In the first months 1936 she took part of a gunnery exercise with live ammunition along with the battleship Jaime I and her sister cruisers Libertad and Miguel de Cervantes in which they sank the target ship, the old unarmored cruiser Conde del Venadito. In July 1936 Almirante Cervera was docked at Ferrol, which prevented her from taking part in the first operations of the war. She fell into the hands of Franco's side when his troops seized the port. She was under the command of Captain Juan Sanchez-Sandalio Ferragut, who was captured by the rebels and executed by a firing squad. Once in service, she formed a task force with the battleship España and the World War I-era Alsedo-class destroyer Velasco to blockade the ports of northern Spain. She was nicknamed El Chulo del Cantábrico, ("The dandy of Biscay"), because her almost unopposed activity both supporting Franco's army offensives in the north as well as intercepting Republican and international shipping. She was sent to Gijón with orders to help the rebel troops who were under siege there, inside the garrison of Simancas. The barracks were eventually stormed by government forces on 16 August. British historian Hugh Thomas claims that when the Republican troops broke into the compound, the defenders asked Cervera to fire right on them. On 9 August, while firing on government positions, she hit by mistake the British yacht Blue Shadow, whose master, a former RAF officer, was killed. According to Nationalist sources, the yacht was struck by the cruiser with the third broadside of her secondary 4-inch guns, while British sources say the boat was hit by 47-mm rounds. Cervera apparently took the vessel for a Government watercraft. The yacht was abandoned by her crew, who were rescued by the British destroyer Comet. In September the cruiser sailed for the Mediterranean to support the blockade of the Straits of Gibraltar, where she participated in the Battle of Cape Espartel. While the cruiser Canarias sank the Republican destroyer Almirante Ferrándiz in the Alboran Sea after a few salvoes, Cervera engaged the destroyer Gravina along the northwestern coast of Morocco. Cervera fired her main artillery up to 300 times, but managed to hit Gravina only twice. The poor marksmanship of the cruiser enabled Gravina to break action and fleeing for safety to Casablanca. However, this action was decisive, as it opened the Straits to the insurgent's traffic.

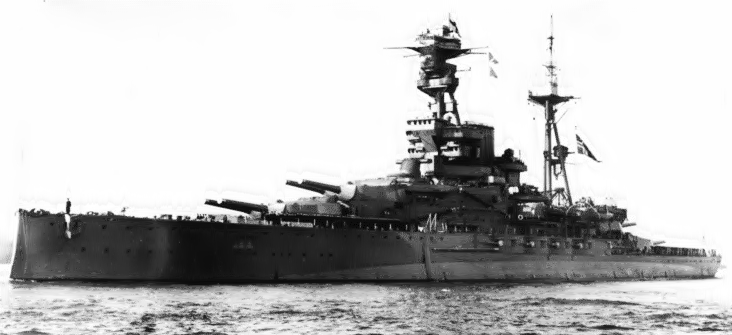
HMS Royal Oak, one of the British battleships that defended the international shipping in Biscay during the Spanish Civil War.

After this operation in the Mediterranean, she spent the following months searching and occasionally seizing foreign blockade runners in Biscay. On 4 April 1937 she joined the armed trawler Galerna in the pursuit and subsequent sinking of the Panamanian-flagged merchant ship Andra. The British-chartered freighter was eventually captured and later sunk by Galerna. She then tried to stop the British merchant Thorpehall which, supported by three British destroyers, managed to slip away and get to Bilbao. On 21 April, Almirante Cervera, along with Galerna, was involved in a three-hour-long confrontation with the British battlecruiser Hood and the destroyer Firedrake, when the insurgent warships fired upon three British merchantmen in a fruitless attempt to stop them. After blunt exchanges between Hood and Cervera, the freighters slipped into Bilbao supported by the fire of a coastal battery and the Basque armed trawler Biskaya. On 4 July, in contrast, Cervera seized the French steamer Trégastel and drove off the British Latymer off Cantabria, when both ships attempted to enter Santander under the protection of the battleship Resolution. The British merchant Gordonia was also intercepted and arrested on 9 July, but she was eventually released and escorted to open seas by British naval units. On 14 July Almirante Cervera, assisted again by Galerna, seized the British cargo ship Molton off Santander, inside Spanish waters, despite the presence of the British battleship Royal Oak.

==== Mediterranean operations ====
During the remainder of 1937, she sank two Republican coast guard units along with a merchant ship. She also shot down a bomber aircraft that had tried to dive-bomb her three times. The cruiser played a central role in the capture of the 9,900-ton government transport Marqués de Comillas.

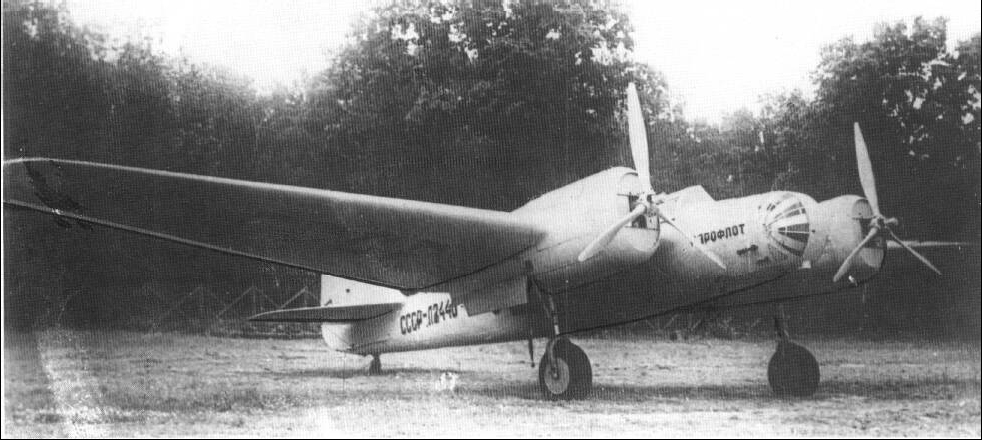
Aeroflot's Tupolev SB

On 17 February 1938 she departed from Palma de Mallorca along with the heavy cruisers Canarias and Baleares and took part in the shelling of Valencia. On 22 February she was attacked again by Republican aircraft: a first wave of biplanes Polikarpov R-Z Natacha of the Soviet Group 30 and then a second wave of Tupolev SB Katiuska. A 50 kg (110 lb) bomb ripped through the stern funnel and although the fuse failed to explode, 25 men were wounded and the machine room damaged. According to other reports, in addition to the 50 kg bomb, Cervera was hit by another bomb that killed 12 of her crew. The battered cruiser was bound for Palma again.

On 6 March she was escorting a convoy and participated in the Battle of Cape Palos, where the heavy cruiser Baleares was torpedoed and sunk by Republican destroyers. She worked in the rescue of survivors from this warship. This loss was somewhat counterbalanced by the commissioning of the refitted cruiser Navarra.

On 23 October 1938 she seized the Soviet steamer Tsyurupa, which was confiscated by the Nationalists and renamed Castillo Villafranca. Cervera continued her operations along the shrinking Republican coastline until the end of the war, but her role throughout the conflict was largely overshadowed by the heavier cruiser Canarias.

=== Proposed modernization and last years ===
Shortly after the war, the Spanish minister of the Navy considered a project to modernize the three cruisers belonging to the class, through "project nº 133". The modernization was to include the addition of a Heinkel He 114 seaplane, the redistribution of the guns in four twin turrets and the fitting of a Decca radar. Though some of these upgrades were actually made to Almirante Cervera's sisters Galicia and Miguel de Cervantes, a lack of materials and financial support owing to World War II did not permit the same work to be performed on Almirante Cervera. Reduced to a part-time training ship, the cruiser was written off by the navy on 31 August 1965.

== See also ==
- List of foreign ships wrecked or lost in the Spanish Civil War
- Spanish cruiser Baleares
- Spanish cruiser Canarias
