= Spanish cruiser Canarias =

Heavy cruiser of the Spanish Navy

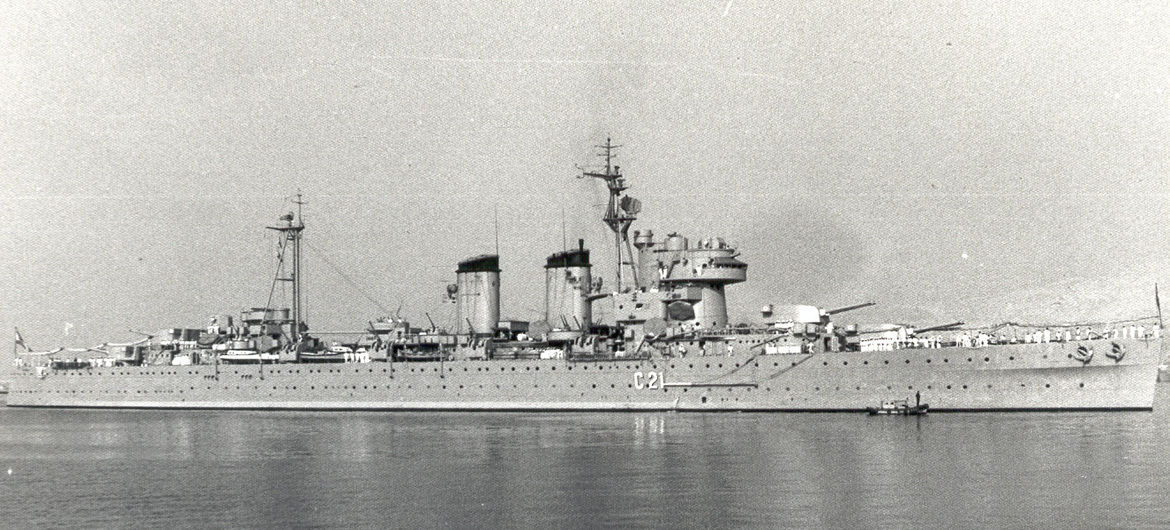
- Heavy cruiser Canarias in Port of Almeria

History

Spain
- Name: Canarias
- Namesake: Canary Islands
- Builder: SECN, Ferrol
- Laid down: 15 August 1928
- Launched: 28 May 1931
- Commissioned: September 1936
- Decommissioned: 17 December 1975
- Fate: Scrapped 1977

General characteristics
- Class & type: Canarias-class heavy cruiser
- Displacement: 10,670 long tons (10,840 t) standard; 13,500 long tons (13,700 t) full load
- Length: 636 ft (194 m)
- Beam: 64 ft (20 m)
- Draught: 21 ft 5 in (6.53 m)
- Installed power: Yarrow type boilers, 90,000 hp (67,000 kW)
- Propulsion: 4 shafts, Parsons type geared turbines
- Speed: 33 knots (61 km/h)
- Range: 8,000 nmi (15,000 km) at 15 kn (28 km/h)
- Complement: 679
- Sensors & processing systems: none
- Armament: 8 × BL 8-inch (203 mm) L/50 Mk.VIII guns in four twin turrets; 8 × 4.7-inch (119 mm) guns; 12 × 40 mm AA guns; 3 × 20 mm AA guns; 12 × 21-inch (533 mm) torpedo tubes in triple mounts above water
- Armour: Belt 2 in (51 mm); Deck 1.5–1 in (38–25 mm); Magazine 4 in (102 mm) box around; Turret 1 in (25 mm); Conning tower 1 in (25 mm)

Canarias was a Canarias-class heavy cruiser of the Spanish Navy. She was built in Spain by the Vickers-Armstrongs subsidiary Sociedad Española de Construcción Naval based on a British design, being a modified version of the Royal Navy′s County class. Canarias saw service during the Spanish Civil War.

== History ==
Canarias was the flagship of the Nationalist Navy and sank 34 ships, including the Spanish Republican Navy destroyer Almirante Ferrándiz during the Battle of Cape Espartel, and the Soviet merchant Komsomol off Oran, both in the second half of 1936. Canarias was the main player of the Battle of Cape Machichaco on 5 March 1937, when the Basque Auxiliary Navy naval trawler Nabarra was destroyed. She also damaged the destroyer José Luis Díez, forcing her to seek refuge at Gibraltar on 29 August 1938. Canarias captured the Republican liner Mar Cantábrico, which was later converted to an auxiliary cruiser. During World War II she took part in the search for survivors from the Bismarck in May 1941.

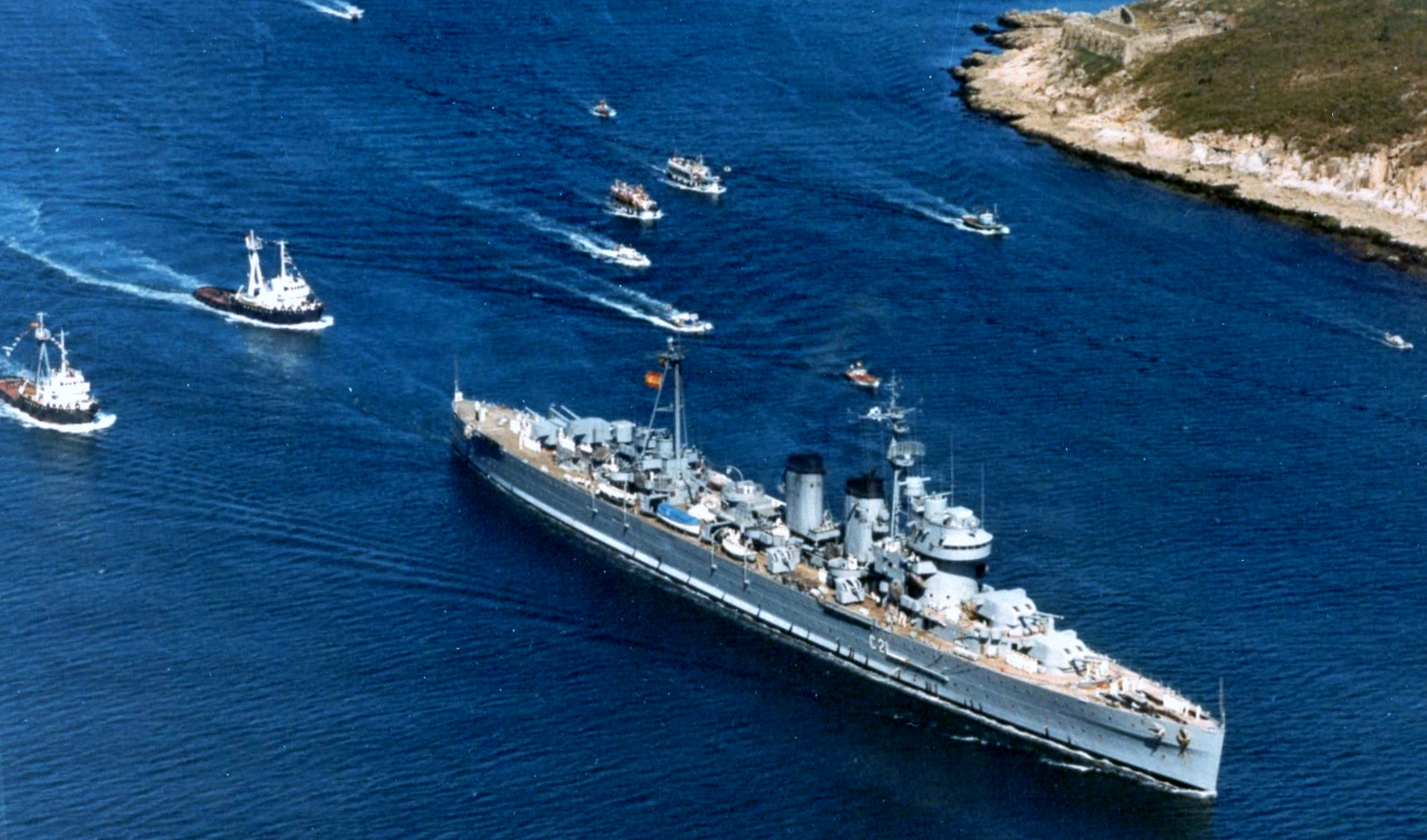
Canarias sailing to be scrapped in 1977

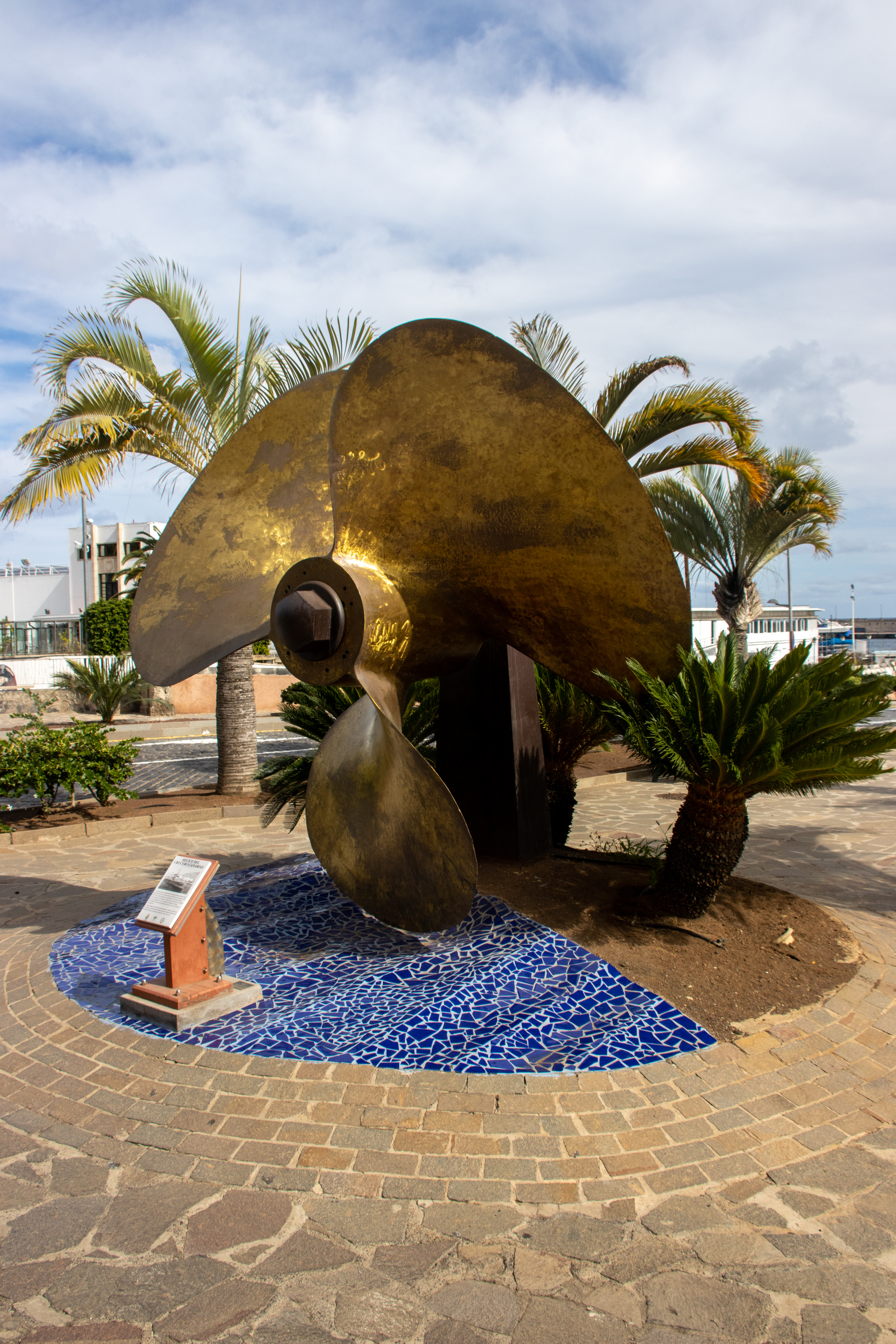
Last propeller of four from Canarias on display in Santa Cruz de Tenerife in 2020

The cruiser remained in commission (due to several repair and refit periods) as the fleet flagship throughout her career. A major refit was planned for Canarias around 1973 to further extend the vessel's life, but a survey of her condition (conducted with help of US Navy personnel) concluded she was too old and obsolete to warrant the work. Some effort was made to turn her into a museum ship, but very little funds were raised for the plan. She was decommissioned in 1975 and then sold for scrap in 1977, but was able to steam under her own power to the scrapyard.
