= Spanish coup of July 1936 =

Fascist military coup against the Second Spanish Republic

- Part of the Spanish Civil War
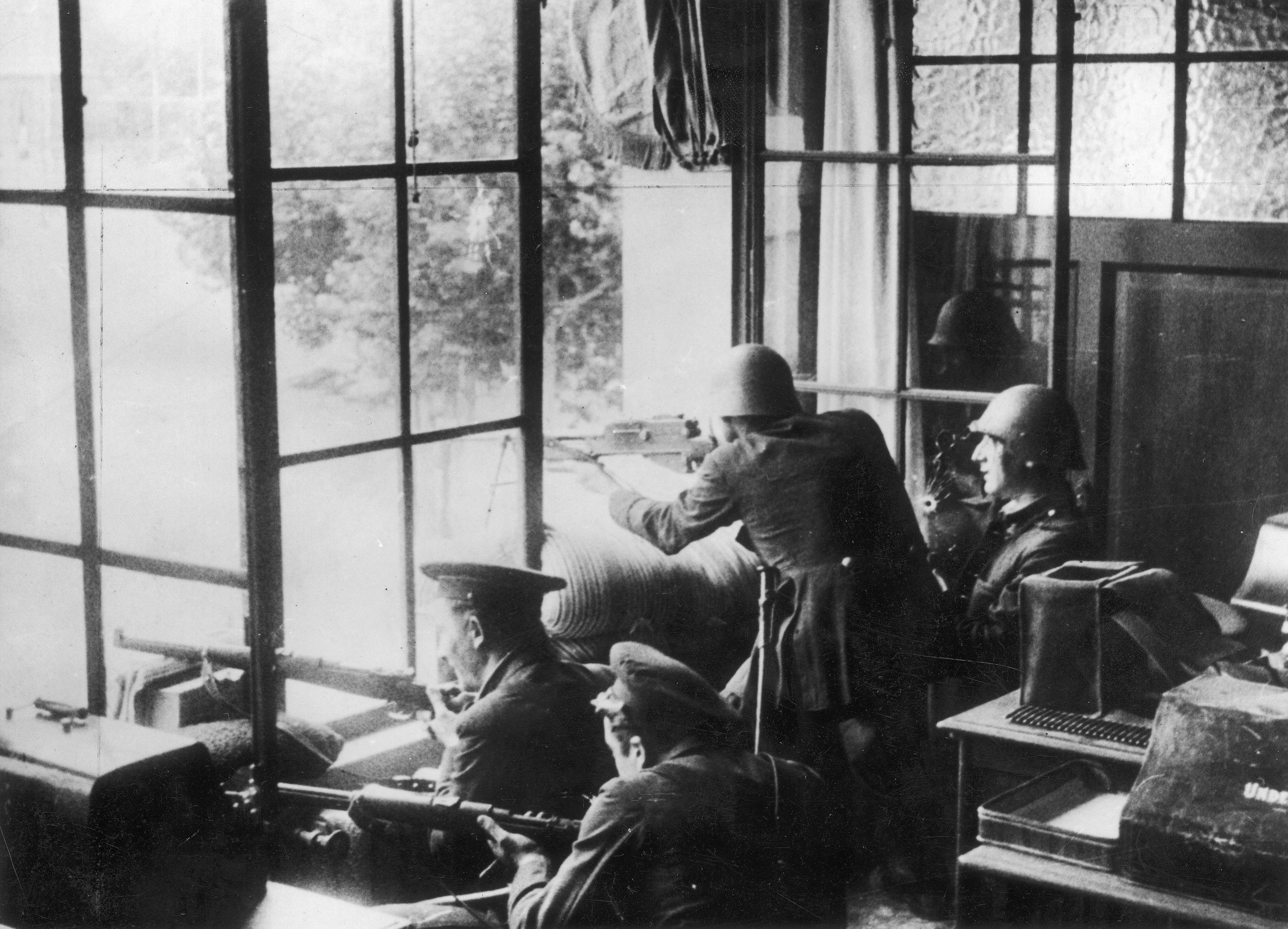
- Republican soldiers and Assault Guards fighting in Barcelona during the uprising
Date	17–21 July 1936
Location	Spain
Result	Start of the Spanish Civil War: Rebel failure to overthrow the Spanish government; Government failure to fully suppress the rebellion

Belligerents
Spanish government	Nationalist rebels

Commanders and leaders
Manuel Azaña; José Giral; Santiago Casares; José Miaja	José Sanjurjo †; Emilio Mola; Francisco Franco; Manuel Goded (executed)

The Spanish coup of July 1936 (Note: (Spanish: Golpe de Estado de España de julio de 1936 or, among the rebels, Alzamiento Nacional)) was a military uprising that was intended to overthrow the Spanish Second Republic, but precipitated the Spanish Civil War, in which Nationalists fought against Republicans for control of Spain. The coup was organized for 18 July 1936, although it started the previous day in Spanish Morocco. Instead of resulting in a prompt transfer of power, the coup split control of the Spanish military and territory roughly in half. The resulting civil war ultimately led to the establishment of a military dictatorship under Francisco Franco, who became ruler of Spain as caudillo.

The rising was intended to be swift, but the government retained control of most of the country including Málaga, Jaén and Almería. Cádiz was taken by the rebels, and General Gonzalo Queipo de Llano managed to secure Seville. In Madrid, the rebels were hemmed into the Montaña barracks, which fell with much bloodshed. On 19 July, the cabinet, headed by the newly appointed prime minister José Giral, ordered the distribution of weapons to the unions. With the defeat of the rebels in Madrid, Barcelona, and Valencia, anarchists took control of large parts of Aragon and Catalonia. The rebel General Goded surrendered in Barcelona and was later sentenced to death and executed. The rebels secured the support of around half of the Spanish Army, which totalled about 66,000 men, including large numbers who were on leave, as well as the 30,000-strong army of Africa. The army of Africa was Spain's most professional and capable military force. The government retained less than half the supply of rifles, heavy and light machine guns, and artillery pieces. Both sides had few tanks and outdated aircraft, while naval capacity was reasonably even. The defection of many regular officers weakened Republican units of all types.

== Background ==
Following the elections of November 1933, Spain entered what was called by the left-wing parties the "black biennium" (Spanish: bienio negro). Both Carlists and Alfonsist monarchists continued to prepare and received the backing of Benito Mussolini. José-María Gil-Robles, the leader of the moderate-right Spanish Confederation of Autonomous Rights (CEDA), supported a centrist Radical Republican Party minority government and controlled his party's more radical youth wing. Monarchists, however, turned their attention to the fascist Falange Española, led by José Antonio Primo de Rivera. Open violence occurred in the streets of Spanish cities. Gil-Robles successfully used an anti-strike law to provoke and to break up unions, one at a time. Efforts to remove local councils from socialist control prompted a general strike, which was brutally put down, with the arrest of four deputies and other significant breaches of Articles 55 and 56 of the constitution.

On 26 September 1934, the minority government was replaced by a cabinet including the RRP and three CEDA members. A UGT general strike in early October 1934 was quickly put down throughout most of Spain. General Francisco Franco was put in informal command of the military effort against the Asturian miners' revolt of 1934 during which striking labourers had occupied several towns and the provincial capital. Around 30,000 workers had been called to arms in ten days. Franco's men, some brought in from Spain's army of Africa, acted horrifically by killing men, women and children and carrying out summary executions when the main cities of Asturias were retaken. About 1,000 workers and about 250 government soldiers were killed, which marked the effective end of the republic. Months of retaliation and repression by both sides followed, and torture was used on political prisoners. Bombings, shootings and political and religious killings were frequent in the streets. Political parties created armed militias. In 1935, a new government under prime minister Alejandro Lerroux saw CEDA increasing its share of ministries to five, with Gil-Roble becoming minister of war. The military was purged of left-wing members and reformed. Those loyal to Gil-Robles were promoted, and Franco was made chief of staff.

Contested under violent circumstances, the 1936 general election was narrowly won by a grouping of left-wing parties, the Popular Front, which defeated the Nationalist group by less than 1% of the vote. As a consequence, the Nationalists began to conspire to overthrow the Republic, rather than take control of it. The government was weak, Manuel Azaña led a minority government, and reconciliation would have been an enormous task. Acts of violence and reprisals spiralled. In April, the Cortes (parliament) replaced Niceto Alcalá-Zamora with Azaña as president, who however was increasingly isolated from everyday politics, and his replacement as prime minister, Casares Quiroga, was weak.

This watershed event inspired the right-wing to give up on parliamentary politics. The monarchist José Calvo Sotelo replaced CEDA's Gil-Robles as the leader of the right in the Cortes. CEDA turned its campaign chest over to the army plotter Emilio Mola. At the same time, communists quickly took over the ranks of socialist organisations, which frightened the middle classes. Several generals decided that the government had to be replaced to prevent the dissolution of Spain, as they held professional politicians in contempt.

== Preparations ==
Following the election of 18 January 1936, the Republican government in the winter and spring that year faced numerous challenges, not least of which was balancing itself between the threat posed by leftist unions, the counter for which might prove to be the continued support of the right-leaning military. As a consequence, Azaña had undertaken reassignment rather than dismissal of suspect generals from their posts. Franco was relieved as chief of staff and transferred to command the Canary Islands. Goded was replaced as Inspector General and made general of the Balearic islands. Emilio Mola was moved from leading the Army of Africa to the post of military commander of Pamplona in Navarre. This allowed Mola to direct the mainland uprising, although the relationship between him and Carlist leaders was problematic. General José Sanjurjo became the figurehead of the operation and helped to come to an agreement with the Carlists. Mola was the chief planner and second in command. José Antonio Primo de Rivera was released from prison in mid-March to restrict the Falange. However, government actions were not as thorough as they might have been since warnings by the director of security and others were not acted upon.

On 12 June, Prime Minister Casares Quiroga met General Juan Yagüe, who was accused of masterminding the growing conspiracy in North Africa. Yagüe managed, falsely, to convince Casares of his loyalty to the Republic. Mola held a meeting between garrison commanders in northern Spain on 15 June, and local authorities, on hearing of that meeting, surrounded it with civil guards. However, Casares ordered their removal and said that he trusted Mola. Mola began serious planning in the spring, but Franco hesitated until early July, which inspired other plotters to refer to him as "Miss Canary Islands 1936". Franco was a key player because of his prestige as a former director of the military academy, and as the man who suppressed the socialist uprising of 1934. He was well respected in the Spanish Moroccan army, Spain's strongest military force. He wrote a cryptic letter to Casares on 23 June which suggested that the military was disloyal but could be restrained if he were put in charge. Casares did nothing, and failed to arrest or to buy off Franco. Franco was due to be assigned control of Morocco in the new regime and largely sidelined. On 5 July an aircraft was chartered to take Franco from the Canary Islands to Morocco; it arrived on 14 July.

== Murder of Calvo Sotelo ==
On 12 July 1936 in Madrid, a member of the Falange, Jorge Bardina, murdered lieutenant José Castillo of the assault guards police force. Castillo was a member of the Socialist Party. The next day, members of the assault guards arrested José Calvo Sotelo, a leading Spanish monarchist and a prominent parliamentary conservative; the original target had been Gil Robles, but he could not be found. Calvo Sotelo had protested against agricultural reforms, expropriations and restrictions on the authority of the Catholic Church, which he considered to be Bolshevist and anarchist. He instead advocated the creation of a corporatist state. The guards shot Calvo Sotelo without trial.

The killing of Calvo Sotelo, a prominent member of Parliament, and the involvement of the police aroused suspicions and strong reactions among the government's opponents on the right. (Note: Thomas (2001). pp. 196–198, 309: Condés was a close personal friend of Castillo. His squad had originally sought to arrest Gil Robles as a reprisal for Castillo's murder, but Robles was not at home and so they went to the house of Calvo Sotelo. Thomas concluded that the intention of Condés was to arrest Calvo Sotelo and that Cuenca acted on his own initiative, but he acknowledges other sources that dispute this finding.) Massive reprisals followed. Although the conservative Nationalist generals had already been in the advanced stages of a planned uprising, the event provided a catalyst and a convenient public justification for their coup, particularly that Spain had to be saved from anarchy by military, rather than democratic, means. The socialists and communists, led by Prieto, demanded for arms to be distributed to the people before the military took over, but the prime minister was hesitant.

Franco's plane landed in Gran Canaria on 14 July, but since he was based in Tenerife, he would not have made the plane without the death of General Amado Balmes, the military commander in Gran Canaria, who was killed in a shooting on 16 July. Whether his death was an accident, suicide or murder is unknown: Balmes reportedly shot himself in the stomach by accident and died shortly after. Some conspiracy theories suggest that he was murdered, but he would have had enough time to denounce his murderers if they had existed, and the officer who certified his death as an accident was not a conspirator and remained loyal to the Republic during the Civil War.

== Beginning ==
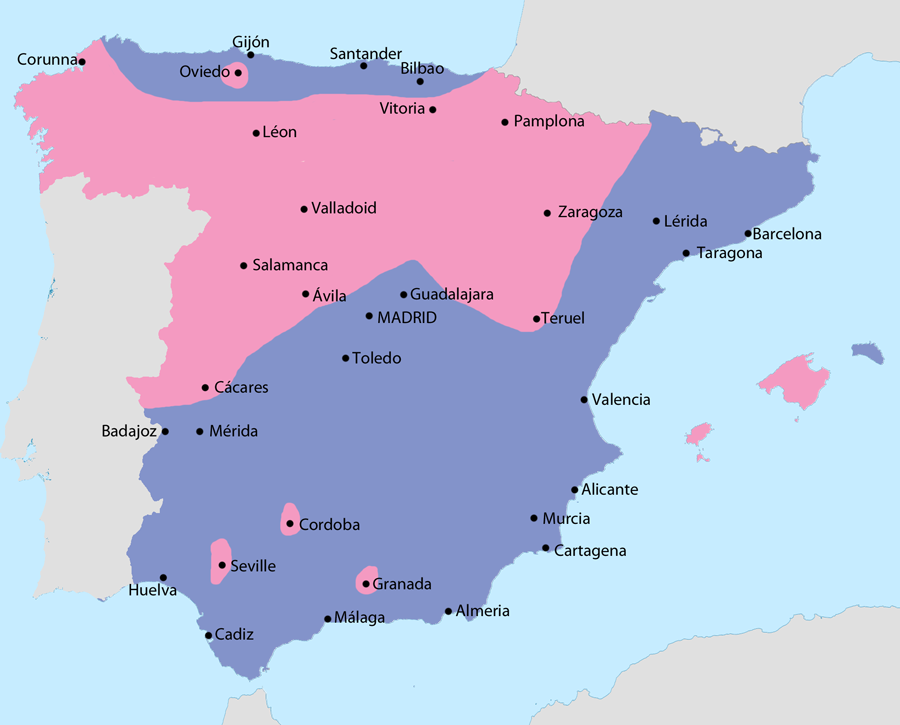
Map showing Spain in July 1936, except for Spanish Morocco and the Canary Islands: Area under Nationalist control Area under Republican control

The uprising was intended for 18 July, at 5 a.m. in Morocco; most garrisons in Spain were supposed to rise one day later. The rising was intended to be a swift coup d'état, but the government retained control of most of the country.

Rebel control in Spanish Morocco was all but certain. The 30,000-strong Army of Africa was the professional elite of the Spanish Army. Many of its soldiers acted as mercenaries, and the vast majority of officers backed the rebel cause. The regulares, troops recruited from the local tribes, were predominantly Muslim and were told that the Republic wished to abolish Allah. The plan was discovered in Morocco during 17 July, which prompted it to be enacted immediately. By the scheduled time, Spanish Morocco had already been secured, as legionnaires moved into working-class areas and shot trade unionists. The army commander in eastern Morocco, General Manuel Romerales, and other senior officers loyal to the Republic were executed. Little resistance was encountered; in total, 189 people were shot by the rebels. Goded and Franco immediately took control of the islands to which they were assigned. Warned that a coup was imminent, leftists barricaded the roads on the Canary Islands on 17 July, but Franco avoided capture by taking a tugboat to the airport.

On 18 July, Casares Quiroga refused an offer of help from the CNT and UGT and proclaimed that only Spanish Morocco had joined the rebels and that the populace should trust legal methods to deal with the uprising. Handing out weapons would be illegal. The CNT and the UGT proclaimed a general strike, which was in effect a mobilisation. They opened weapons caches, some buried since the 1934 risings. The paramilitary forces were better trained than the army but often waited to see the outcome of militia action before either joining or suppressing the rebellion. Quick action by either the rebels or anarchist militias was often enough to decide the fate of a town.

== Coup in military districts ==
In mid-1936, Peninsular Spain was divided into eight military districts, each home to one division. Most senior staff forming the local command layer were not involved in the conspiracy. Out of eight district commanders and commanders of respective divisions at the same time, there was only one engaged in the plot and adhered to the coup. Out of eight district chiefs of staff, there were three officers involved in the conspiracy, and three more joined the unfolding rebellion. The conspiracy relied mostly on mid-range staff and line officers; they were expected to take control of the garrisons and either overpower their seniors or persuade them to join. In some districts, like Zaragoza or Valladolid, the conspiracy network was well developed, and Emilio Mola was confident of success. In other districts, like Valencia or La Coruña, the network was sketchy, and the plotters took into account a possible failure.

Protagonists in military districts as of late 17 July: red=loyal, blue=in conspiracy, no color=ambiguous/unknown
military district	commander	chief of staff	plot leader	appointed rebel district commander
1. Madrid	Virgilio Cabanellas Ferrer	Luis Pérez-Peñamaría	Rafael Villegas Montesinos	Rafael Villegas Montesinos
2. Seville	José Fernández Villa-Abrille	Juan Cantero Ortega	José Cuesta Monereo	Gonzalo Queipo de Llano y Sierra
3. Valencia	Fernando Martínez Monje	Adolfo Machinandiarena Berga	Bartolomé Barba Hernández	Manuel González Carrasco
4. Barcelona	Francisco Llano de la Encomienda	Manuel Moxó Marcaida	Francisco Mut Ramón	Manuel Goded Llopis
5. Zaragoza	Miguel Cabanellas Ferrer	Federico Montaner Canet	Miguel Cabanellas Ferrer	Miguel Cabanellas Ferrer
6. Burgos	Domingo Batet Mestres	Fernando Moreno Calderón	José Aizpuru Martín-Pinillos	Fidel Dávila Arrondo
7. Valladolid	Nicolás Molero Lobo	Juan Quero Orozco	Anselmo López-Maristany	Andrés Saliquet Zumeta
8. La Coruña	Enrique Salcedo Molinuevo	Luis Tovar Figueras	Fermín Gutiérrez Soto	(not appointed)

=== Madrid (1st Division) ===
The district commander General Virgilio Cabanellas Ferrer was aware of the conspiracy but did not intend to join the coup. He was dismissed in the early hours of 18 July and imprisoned until 1939, replaced with Luis Castello Pantoja, at the time in Badajoz. Initially, José Miaja acted as a caretaker, but early in the morning of 19 July he was appointed the minister of war in the Martínez Barrio government, and his caretaker role was taken over by Manuel Cardenal Dominicis. Castello arrived in Madrid on 19 July but discovered he had just been appointed minister of war in the new Giral government. The same day Celestino García Antúnez was nominated the new district commander; by this time fighting was already in full swing. The divisional chief of staff, Colonel Luis Pérez-Peñamaría, was supportive of the plot but did not organise it. The rebel scheme was managed by other Madrid-based generals, especially Rafael Villegas who featured as head of the rebellious Madrid troops, and Joaquín Fanjul and his son Juan Manuel Fanjul. Miaja was probably sounded on his access, but he either declined or remained ambiguous. On 18 July Villegas cited some difficulties and remained passive; it was Joaquín Fanjul who moved to the Montaña barracks and assumed the leading role. Pérez-Peñamaria pretended to be loyal. Once the troops of Fanjul had been defeated, the 1st Division was officially dissolved. Cabanellas and Pérez-Peñamaria were detained; Pérez-Peñamaria was tried for negligence and later tried also by the Nationalists. Villegas was also arrested and was soon executed by the Republican militia.

Control of provincial capitals as of July:
capital	18	19	20	21	day taken
Albacete	R	N	N	N	29.03.39
Alicante	R	R	R	R	30.03.39
Almería	R	R	R	R	31.03.39
Ávila	R	N	N	N	
Badajoz	R	R	R	R	14.08.36
Barcelona	R	R	R	R	26.01.39
Bilbao	R	R	R	R	19.06.37
Burgos	R	N	N	N	
Cáceres	R	N	N	N	
Cádiz	R	N	N	N	
Castellón	R	R	R	R	15.06.38
Ciudad Real	R	R	R	R	29.03.39
Córdoba	N	N	N	N	
La Coruña	R	R	N	N	
Cuenca	R	R	R	R	29.03.39
Girona	R	R	R	R	05.02.39
Granada	R	R	N	N	
Guadalajara	R	R	R	N	29.03.39
Huelva	R	R	R	R	28.07.36
Huesca	R	N	N	N	
Jaén	R	R	R	R	29.03.39
Las Palmas	N	N	N	N	
León	R	R	N	N	
Lérida	R	R	R	R	03.04.38
Logroño	R	N	N	N	
Lugo	R	R	N	N	
Madrid	R	R	R	R	29.03.39
Málaga	R	R	R	R	08.02.37
Murcia	R	R	R	R	31.03.39
Orense	R	R	N	N	
Oviedo	R	R	N	N	
Palencia	R	N	N	N	
Palma de Mallorca	R	N	N	N	
Pamplona	R	N	N	N	
Pontevedra	R	R	N	N	
Salamanca	R	N	N	N	
San Sebastián	R	R	R	R	13.09.36
S. Cruz de Tenerife	N	N	N	N	
Santander	R	R	R	R	26.08.37
Segovia	R	N	N	N	
Sevilla	N	N	N	N	
Soria	R	R	R	N	
Tarragona	R	R	R	R	14.01.39
Teruel	R	N	N	N	22.02.38
Toledo	R	R	R	R	27.09.36
Valencia	R	R	R	R	30.03.39
Valladolid	R	N	N	N	
Vitoria	R	N	N	N	
Zamora	R	N	N	N	
Zaragoza	R	N	N	N	

=== Seville (2nd Division) ===
The district commander, José Fernández Villa-Abrille, and his chief of staff, Juan Cantero Ortega, were loyal to the government. The conspiracy network was headed by the staff officer comandante José Cuesta Monereo, who built an efficient structure, described by some as a "parallel staff". A few days before the coup, Villa-Abrille was invited to join. He declined, but nothing is known of him taking action against the plotters. According to Emilio Mola's plan, Queipo de Llano was to assume command of the rebel Seville troops. On 18 July Cuesta organised Queipo de Llano's takeover of the garrison. Villa-Abrille was incapacitated and detained, and later tried by the Nationalists and sentenced to prison. At the time of the coup, Cantero was on leave in Algeciras, where he assumed a wait-and-see attitude. He returned to Seville early August; the victorious Nationalists released him from all functions.

=== Valencia (3rd Division) ===
Neither the district commander, Fernando Martínez Monje, nor his chief of staff, Adolfo Machinandiarena Berga, was involved in the plot. The local conspiracy junta missed officers serving in critical positions. The most important of these officers was Bartolomé Barba Hernández, but he excelled in ensuring civilian, rather than military, support. General Manuel González Carrasco, who was initially marked to lead the rebels, was reassigned by Mola to lead the Barcelona rising and was reassigned to Valencia shortly before the coup. On 18 July a few conspirators tried to persuade Martínez Monje to join the insurgency, but the commander remained ambiguous, which was the position also adopted by Machinandiarena. Engulfed by doubts, González Carrasco remained rather passive. Many conspiring officers were ready to join the coup once orders were given by divisional command. For about two weeks, the Valencia garrison did not take a firm position. Eventually, Barba and González Carrasco fled to the Nationalist zone. Martínez Monje was reassigned to non-combat positions, and Machinandiarena was detained and tried, and later tried also by the Nationalists.

=== Barcelona (4th Division) ===
The district commander, Francisco Llano de la Encomienda, was entirely loyal to the Republic. His chief of staff, Manuel Moxó Marcaida, was aware of the plot, and it is likely that he supported it. The key man of Mola's in Barcelona was Francisco Mut Ramón, a top member of the divisional staff who was supported by some local commanders. Mola's plan envisioned that the command of the rebellious Barcelona troops be assumed by Manuel González Carrasco, but shortly before the coup, he was reassigned to Valencia and replaced by Manuel Goded. The latter arrived in Barcelona when the rebellion was already underway; Moxó immediately accepted his command. Llano de la Encomienda actively worked to suppress the coup, until he was detained by units loyal to Goded; his captivity lasted only a few hours. Once the military was overwhelmed by the crowd, Goded and Moxó were arrested and tried, the former executed by firing squad and the latter murdered by the militia. Mut Ramón escaped and made it to the Nationalist zone.

=== Zaragoza (5th Division) ===
Both the district commander, Miguel Cabanellas Ferrer, and his chief of staff, Federico Montaner, were active conspirators. The conspiracy network was firm, and Mola was confident that the Zaragoza troops would help the coup. Though the conspiracy network was not extensive, the fact that both key military men were involved in the plot led to almost all troops in the district obeying the orders of the rebellious command. A few loyalist officers were quickly overwhelmed by the rebels. Despite his age Cabanellas led the action, and Montaner supported him as the chief of staff. As had been planned, Cabanellas remained in command of the Zaragoza military district after the successful coup.

=== Burgos (6th Division) ===
The district commander, Domingo Batet Mestres, did not take part in the conspiracy and actively tried to prevent any unrest. The interim chief of staff, José Aizpuru Martín-Pinillos ceded his post in early July 1936, to Fernando Moreno Calderón, who was not involved in the plot, but Aizpuru went on as the chief plotter. His network was so extensive that Mola, formally Batet's subordinate as commander of the Pamplona military region, was confident the 6th Division would be firmly with the rebels. On 19 July they took over critical posts of command. Batet firmly refused to join and was detained, tried and executed. Moreno joined in at the last minute after he faced resolute action of junior officers. As planned by Mola, after the successful coup the command of Burgos military district and the 6. Division was assumed by Fidel Dávila Arrondo.

=== Valladolid (7th Division) ===
The district commander General Nicolás Molero Lobo was not involved in the plot. The key person among the conspirators was the chief of staff, Anselmo López-Maristany, but in June he was posted to Madrid, and he kept co-ordinating the plot in Valladolid from the capital. His successor as chief of staff, Juan Quero Orozco, was not involved in the plot and was not aware of it unfolding. On the evening of 18 July a group of senior officers from Madrid, including Saliquet, Uzquiano, López-Maristany and Martín-Montalvo, led the takeover of the military structures, which involved a shootout with men of Molero, who was eventually detained. Later, Molero was tried by the Nationalists and sentenced to prison. Quero remained passive and eventually joined the rebels. In line with initial planning, the command of the Valladolid district was assumed by Andrés Saliquet.

=== La Coruña (8th Division) ===
The district commander, Enrique Salcedo Molinuevo, was not aware of the conspiracy. The chief of staff, Luis Tovar Figueras, maintained sporadic and loose contacts with UME, but he neither took part in the conspiracy nor took any action against it. Key among the plotters was Fermín Gutiérrez Soto, a high-ranking member of the divisional staff. On 18 and 19 July the conspiracy network remained relatively disorganised, and no resolute action had been taken. Suspicious of his staff, in the early hours of 20 July Salcedo ordered the detention of both Tovar and Gutiérrez. It was the rapid counteraction of Gutiérrez and coronel Martin Alonso that produced the detention of Salcedo, who was later tried and executed. Tovar adhered to the coup. Given the sketchy insurgency scheme in La Coruña, Mola's plan did not envision any specific individual as local commander following the coup, a role that was temporarily assumed by Enrique Cánovas Lacruz, who had refused to take the rebel command a few times before he eventually accepted it.

== Aftermath ==
Despite the ruthlessness and determination of the supporters of the coup, the rebels failed to take any major cities, with the critical exception of Seville, which provided a landing point for Franco's African troops. The conservative and Catholic areas of Old Castile and León fell quickly, and in Pamplona, the uprising was celebrated as if it were a festival. The government retained control of Málaga, Jaén and Almería. Cádiz was taken for the rebels with the help of the first troops from the Army of Africa. In Madrid, the rebels were hemmed into the Montaña barracks. The barracks fell the next day with much bloodshed. Republican leader Santiago Casares Quiroga was replaced by José Giral, who ordered the distribution of weapons among the civilian population. This facilitated the defeat of the army insurrection in the main industrial centres, including Madrid, Barcelona, Valencia and the other main cities in the Mediterranean area, but it allowed the anarchists to arm themselves and take control of Barcelona and large swathes of Aragon and Catalonia. In Barcelona, the official government lost control of security, essential services and welfare. However, the anarchists held back from demanding too much political power, which could have had even more severe consequences. General Goded surrendered in Barcelona and was later condemned to death, although he had broadcast a message explaining his captivity over the radio, at the request of the authorities.

Meanwhile, the Army of Africa began to transfer across the Strait of Gibraltar to Seville by air on the evening of 19 July. At first only a handful of captured aircraft were used then from the end of July, Junkers Ju 52 and Savoia-Marchetti SM.81 transport aircraft, provided by Nazi Germany and Fascist Italy respectively, joined the airlift; without any loyalist Air Force interference owing to the confusion on the Spanish Republican side. The massive airlift of troops from Spanish Morocco was the world's first long-range combat airlift and allowed Franco's troops to join General Queipo de Llano's forces in Seville. Their quick movement allowed them to meet General Emilio Mola's Northern Army and secure most of northern and northwestern Spain, as well as central and western Andalusia. The Republican Government was left controlling almost all of the Eastern Spanish coast and the central area around Madrid, as well as Asturias, Cantabria and part of the Basque Country in the north.

Mola was keen to create a sense of fear within Nationalist-controlled areas. There was a massive purge of Freemasons and a large part of the left, including some moderate socialists. When proclaiming martial law in Pamplona, Mola declared: "Re-establishing the principle of authority demands unavoidably that punishments be exemplary in terms of both their severity and the speed with which they will be carried out, without doubt or hesitation. In a subsequent meeting with mayors of the province of Navarre, he went even further:

It is necessary to spread terror. We have to create the impression of mastery, eliminating without scruples or hesitation all those who do not think as we do. There can be no cowardice. If we vacillate one moment and fail to proceed with the greatest determination, we will not win. Anyone who helps or hides a communist or a supporter of the Popular Front will be shot.

Orders such as these, to instill fear through systematic executions in captured cities, provoked a widespread hostile response. Acts of spontaneous revenge flared up in Loyalist areas with the random murders of perceived fascists, conservatives and Nationalists by excited mobs. The result of the coup was a polarization of Spain.

The Nationalist area of control contained roughly 11 million of Spain's population of 25 million. The rebels had secured the support of around half of Spain's territorial army, some 60,000 men. In Republican units, however, up to 90% of officers rebelled, defected or merely disappeared, and the loyalty to the Republic of those remaining was put into doubt. Some who disappeared would later turn up in Nationalist ranks. Collectively, this loss of trained officers considerably reduced the effectiveness of those regular military units still controlled by the government, as a new command structure had to be fashioned within these units. No such problem occurred in Nationalist units.

In terms of raw numbers, the Army of Africa, which was entirely under Nationalist control, had 30,000 men and was considered Spain's top fighting force. The rebels were also joined by 30,000 members of Spain's militarized police forces, the Assault Guards, the Civil Guards and the Carabineers. 50,000 members of the latter stayed loyal to the government. The distribution of weapons brought into sharp focus the challenge faced by the Republican government at the time of the coup. Of 500,000 government-controlled rifles, around 200,000 were retained by the government; 65,000 were issued to the Madrid populace in the days following the uprising. Of these, only 7,000 were usable; worse, 70,000 or so rifles were lost following early Nationalist advances in the war. Republicans controlled only about a third of both heavy and light machine guns; of 1,007 artillery pieces, 387 were in Republican hands, the remainder in those of the rebel Nationalists. The Spanish Army had, before the coup, just 18 tanks of sufficiently modern design; here the Republicans had retained control of 10.

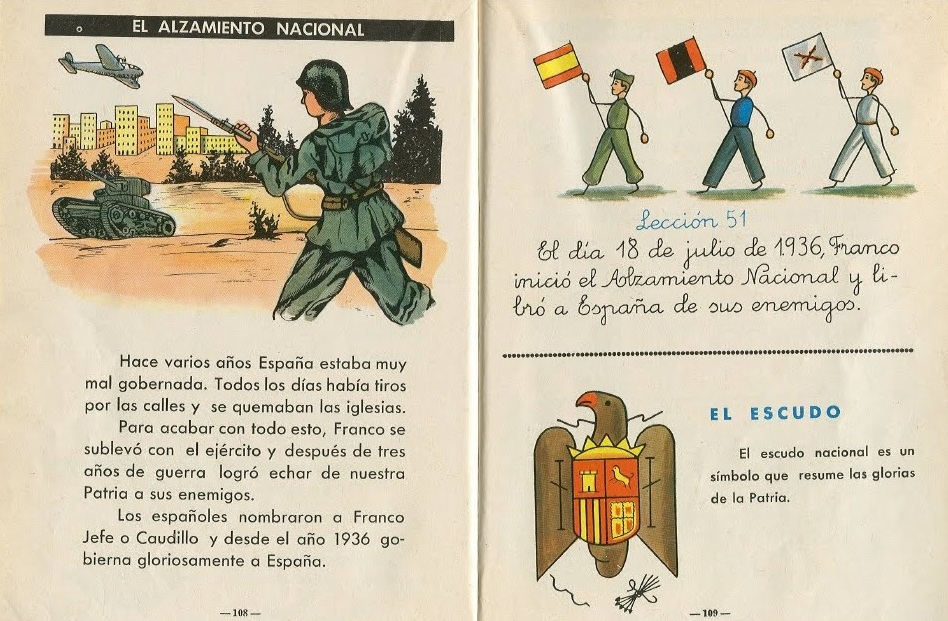
coup in later Francoist schoolbook

In regards to the navy, the Nationalists had seized control of just 17 warships, leaving the Republicans with 27. However, the most modern ships (the navy’s two Canarias-class cruisers) were in Nationalist hands. Although not ready for service when the war broke out, the quality of Nationalist ships compensated for their lack in numbers. The Spanish Republican Navy in terms of personnel also suffered from the same problems as the Spanish Republican Army: many officers had defected to the Nationalists, or had been killed after trying to do so. By contrast, the concerns of a Republican officer that such a coup was imminent caused two-thirds of the available air capability to be retained by the Republican government. However, the whole of the air service was outdated; it was vulnerable during flight and susceptible to mechanical problems.

== See also ==
- List of Spanish Nationalist military equipment of the Spanish Civil War
- List of Spanish Republican military equipment of the Spanish Civil War
- Timeline of the Spanish July 1936 coup
