= Fernando Moreno Calderón =

Spanish military officer

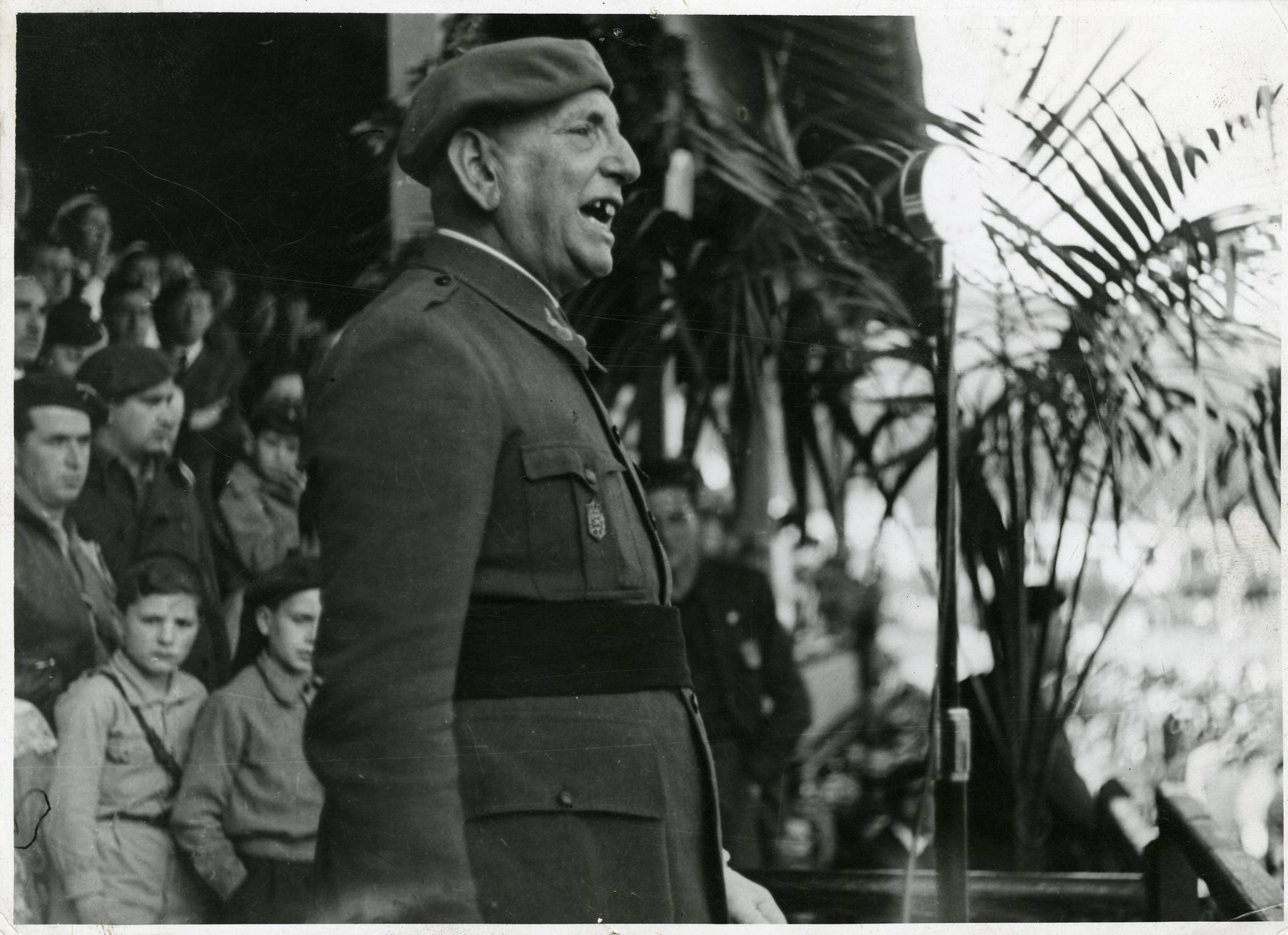
- Moreno speaking in San Sebastián, 1939
- Born: Fernando Moreno Calderón; 1880; Puerto Rico, Kingdom of Spain
- Died: 1967 (aged 86–87); Madrid, Spanish State
- Military career
- Allegiance: Kingdom of Spain (1896–1931); Spanish Republic (1931–1936); Spanish State (1936–1947)
- Branch: Spanish Army
- Service years: 1896–1947
- Rank: General
- Commands: Military Governor of Barcelona; IV Military Region; Military Governor of Madrid
- Conflicts: Rif War; Spanish Civil War
- Awards: Grand Cross of the Royal and Military Order of Saint Hermenegild (1941); Grand Cross (with White Decoration) of Military Merit (1944); Grand Cross of the Order of Charles III (1947); Grand Cross of the Order of Isabella the Catholic (1961)

Fernando Moreno Calderón (Puerto Rico, 1880 – Madrid, 1967) was a Spanish military officer, participant in the Spanish coup of July 1936 against the Second Republic that began the Spanish Civil War. He was part of the National Defense Junta that assumed power in the areas under control of the Nationalist faction.

== Biography ==
Moreno was born in the Spanish colony of Puerto Rico in 1880. At the age of 16, he entered the Toledo Infantry Academy, rising to general staff captain in 1907.

In 1912 he was assigned to the Spanish protectorate in Morocco, where he participated in the Rif War until 1915. The merits acquired in North Africa earned him promotion to commander and several decorations. Later he served as a professor at the Escuela Superior de Guerra, and in 1928 he wrote the essay The Command and the Service of the General Staff, a practical guide for solving military problems.

He participated in the Spanish coup of July 1936, and as general staff colonel, he was in charge of asking General Domènec Batet to take charge of his rebellious garrison. Given his refusal to join the coup, Batet was arrested by his subordinates (several years later, sentenced to death, by order of Franco). In the aftermath of the 1936 coup, Moreno was one of the six members of the National Defense Junta established in Burgos by the rebels. As chief of staff of the Northern Army, he was second in command to General Emilio Mola.

After the war, Moreno held the positions of Military Governor of Barcelona between 1942 and 1944, Captain General of the IV Military Region, and Military Governor of Madrid between 1944 and 1947, when he definitively retired from the army. He died in Madrid in 1967.

== Charges of crimes against humanity and illegal detention ==
In 2008, he was one of the thirty-five senior Francoist officials charged by the Audiencia Nacional in the summary instructed by judge Baltasar Garzón for the alleged crimess of illegal detention and crimes against humanity that were supposedly committed during the Spanish Civil War and the first years of the Francoist regime. The judge declared Moreno's criminal liability extinguished when he received reliable evidence of his death, which had occurred more than forty years earlier. The investigation of the case was so controversial that Garzón was accused of perverting the course of justice, tried and acquitted by the Supreme Court of Spain.
