= Luis Castelló Pantoja =

Spanish general

- Born: 1881; Guadalcanal, Spain
- Died: 27 September 1962 (aged 80–81); Guadalcanal, Spain
- Military career
- Allegiance: Kingdom of Spain; Spanish Republic
- Rank: Major General Infantry
- Commands: • 2nd Infantry Brigade (1936) • Organic Division I (1936)
- Conflicts: Guerra Civil Española
- Awards: Legion of Honor
- Other work: Ministry of Defence (Spain)

Luis Castelló Pantoja (Guadalcanal, Seville, 1881 – Guadalcanal, September 27, 1962), was a Spanish military infantry general associated with the Spanish Civil War. A republican minister of war during the early months of the war, he tried to stop the revolutionary chaos that followed the July 1936 coup.

== Biography ==
=== The Second Republic ===
Pantoja was the uncle of Juan Simeón Vidarte, Socialist deputy for the province of Badajoz. He was one of three military leaders (the other two were Francisco Franco and Carlos Masquelet Lacaci) who were present at the meeting of Eduardo López Ochoa with the Ministers of War (Diego Hidalgo) and the Interior (Eloy Vaquero Cantillo) which organized the suppression of the insurrection in Asturias in 1934.

== Civil War ==
Pantoja was brigadier general in the Infantry in charge of the 2nd Infantry Brigade and military commander of the Badajoz plaza. He managed to keep the Castile regiment from joining the revolt, remaining on the side of the government. Vidarte informed him of his promotion as head of Organic Division I following the dismissal of Virgilio Cabanellas Ferrer. He never managed to take command, moving to Madrid on July 19, 1936. He left his wife and two daughters in Badajoz and they were captured by the rebels after the conquest of the city by Colonel Juan Yagüe.

After arriving in Madrid he was immediately appointed Minister of War in the Cabinet chaired by José Giral, replacing José Miaja Menant, a position he held until August 6, 1936 when he was replaced by Juan Hernández Saravia. According to Ramon Salas Larrazabal:

... Castelló soon realized that he was to become no more than a nominal minister. The revolution had reached Madrid and its influence was felt in a sub-committee in the Ministry made up of Lieutenant Colonel Hernández Saravia, commanders Hidalgo de Cisneros, Chirlandas and Mezquita, captains Cordón, Núñez Mazas and Freire and Lieutenant Martin Blazquez.

Despite challenges, Castelló tried to stem the revolutionary chaos of the republican rearguard by organizing the military efforts. On July 20 he dismissed General Garcia Antúnez, putting the Organic Division I in the hands of General Riquelme. In the Cabinet he opposed the planned invasion of Majorca by Captain Alberto Bayo (that was subsequently carried out on August 16, 1936 and turn out to be a failure), arguing for the need to use the forces to defend Madrid in the Zaragoza and Huesca sieges in the almost defenceless Aragon front.

Following his resignation as Minister of War, he took over the military government of Madrid. Affected by the shooting of his brother by the anarchist militias and the imprisonment of his wife and daughters by rebels, he suffered a nervous breakdown and had to be admitted to the Leganes psychiatric hospital. After his discharge, he took refuge in the French embassy, where he remained until the spring of 1937 when he moved to France.

== Detention and death ==
In 1942 Pantoja was arrested by the Gestapo in occupied France and delivered to Francoist Spain, where he was tried and sentenced to death. He spent three years in prison before being pardoned in 1946. After a long illness he died in the company of his daughters on 27 September 1962.

Preceded by : Major General; Virgilio Cabanellas Ferrer	Commander of Organic Division I 19 July 1936	Succeeded by : General; José Riquelme y López Bago
Preceded by : José Miaja Menant	Ministry of War; 19 July - 6 August 1936	Succeeded by : Juan Hernández Saravia
