= Luis González de Ubieta =

- Born: Luis González de Ubieta y González del Campillo; 1899; Spain
- Died: 30 December 1950 (aged 50–51); At sea near Barranquilla, Colombia
- Military career
- Allegiance: Spanish Republic
- Branch: Spanish Republican Navy
- Rank: Admiral of the Fleet
- Conflicts: Spanish Civil War: Battle of Cape Palos; Battle of Minorca (1939)
- Awards: Laureate Plate of Madrid

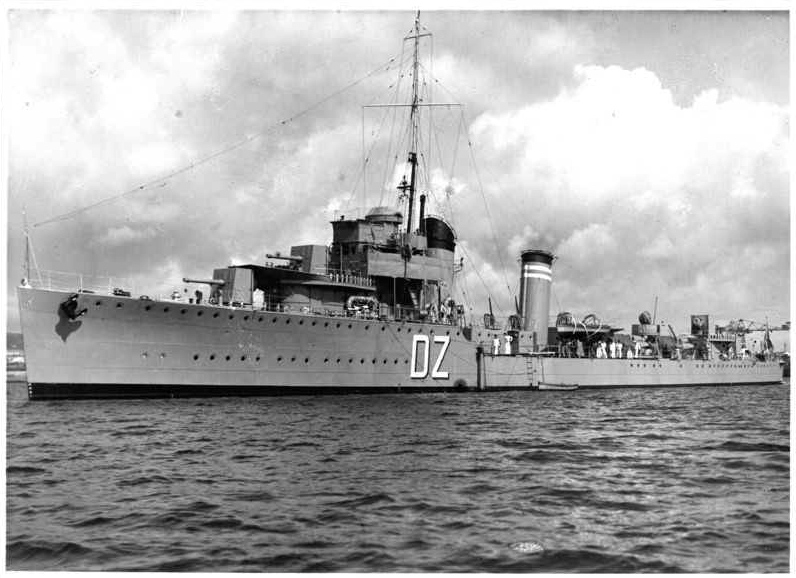
Destroyer José Luis Díez (JD). González de Ubieta became commander of this Republican Navy warship at the beginning of the Civil War.

Luis González de Ubieta y González del Campillo (1899 – 30 December 1950) was an admiral of the Spanish Republican Navy during the Spanish Civil War. He died in exile as the captain of the Panamanian merchant vessel Chiriqui, refusing to be rescued when the ship under his command sank in the Caribbean Sea not far from Barranquilla.

== Early life ==
There is little information on Luis González de Ubieta's childhood and youth. His father, Juan Daniel González de Ubieta y Ubieta, was a forestry engineer born in the Gordexola Valley in Biscay. He died in Madrid in 1925 and was survived by his widow, Mrs González del Campillo, and eight children.

In mid 1936, at the time of the July 1936 pro-Fascist coup attempt that marked the beginning of the Spanish Civil War, Luis González de Ubieta had risen to the rank of lieutenant commander (Spanish: Capitán de Corbeta) of the Spanish Republican Navy. Then he was in command of oceanographic and hydrographic research vessel Ártabro (A-2), based in Cartagena. He refused to join the rebels, remaining loyal to the Spanish Republic.

Since most high officers of the Spanish Republican Navy had joined the rebellion, Luis González de Ubieta rose rapidly both in rank and authority within the loyalist fleet. Thus, at the beginning of the civil war, he became commander of the destroyer José Luis Díez and was sent to quell a minor conflict in Alicante when a group of rebel troops from Orihuela and smaller towns of the Vega Baja tried unsuccessfully to initiate a siege of the city. Two months later, he was in charge of the cruiser Miguel de Cervantes, on which he took part in a naval operation that entered the Bay of Biscay (Expedición al Mar Cantábrico) in September and October 1936.

Following the defeat of the Spanish Republican fleet on 27 September 1938 at the Battle of Cape Cherchell, when a series of tactical errors on the part of the Republican command resulted in the loss of two cargo ships, Luis González de Ubieta became the Captain General of the fleet and promoted to the rank of admiral after his predecessor, Miguel Buiza, was relieved of his duties. President Manuel Azaña could not hide his disappointment, acknowledging in his memoirs the indecisiveness of the former commander of the Spanish Republican Navy, despite having a greater number of ships.

Under Luis González de Ubieta's command, the Republican Navy concentrated on the protection of maritime convoys supplying the internationally isolated Spanish Republic, as well as the training of naval officers and their ships' crews.

In March 1938, the Nationalist cruiser Baleares—along with fellow rebel cruisers Canarias and Almirante Cervera—met the Republican cruisers Libertad and Méndez Núñez, accompanied by five destroyers, off Cartagena in the Battle of Cape Palos. At around 02:15 on 6 March, the Nationalist and Republican cruisers engaged in an ineffective gunnery duel. During the battle, Republican destroyers Sánchez Barcáiztegui, Lepanto, and Almirante Antequera all fired their torpedoes. Two or three of Lepanto′s torpedoes hit Baleares, detonating her forward magazine and sinking her. Out of her crew of 1,206, she suffered 765 seamen killed or missing, among them rebel Vice-Admiral Manuel Vierna Belando, commander of the cruiser division.

The sinking of rebel heavy cruiser Baleares was hailed as a great victory by the Republican government, and Luis González de Ubieta was awarded the Laureate Plate of Madrid (Placa Laureada de Madrid), the highest military award for gallantry of the Second Spanish Republic, while the ships that took part in the Cape Palos naval battle were awarded the Madrid Distinction (Distintivo de Madrid). This naval victory, however, had little effect on the war as a whole for the Spanish Civil War was already turning against the republic.

== End of the war and exile ==
On 8 January 1939, Luis González de Ubieta was transferred to Minorca to take the command of the naval base at Mahón. He also was given the authority to command all of the Republican military forces on the island. One month later, on 8 February, faced with imminent defeat and under pressure from the authorities of the island, who wanted to avoid bloodshed, González de Ubieta surrendered the island to the rebels.

After the fall of Minorca, Luis González de Ubieta, who was the military governor of the island, fled to France on the Royal Navy cruiser HMS Devonshire with 452 other Republican refugees. From Marseille, he managed to reach Paris with his wife, while other Spanish Republican refugees were taken to Port Vendres and then interned in the Argelès-sur-Mer concentration camp by the French authorities.

Luis González de Ubieta lived in exile in France until the 1940 invasion of France by Nazi Germany, when he moved to Mexico. He then went on to settle in Venezuela. At the beginning of the 1950s, he was the captain of the merchant ship Chiriqui, a cattle transport flying the Panamanian flag. On 30 December 1950, his ship sank off Bocas de Ceniza, close to the mouth of the Magdalena River, in Colombian waters. Luis González de Ubieta refused to be rescued and went down with his ship.

== See also ==
- Battle of Minorca (1939)
- Spanish Republican Navy
- The captain goes down with the ship

== Bibliography ==
- Bruno Alonso González, La flota republicana y la guerra civil de España, Ed. Renacimiento, México 1944 ISBN 84-96133-75-3 (in Spanish)
- Michael Alpert, La Guerra Civil española en el mar, Editorial Critica, ISBN 978-84-8432-975-6 (in Spanish)
- José Cervera, Avatares de la guerra española en el mar, Editorial Noray, 2011, ISBN 978-84-7486-237-9 (in Spanish)
- Carlos Engel Masoliver, El Cuerpo de Oficiales en la guerra de España, Ed. Quirón, ISBN 978-84-96935075 (in Spanish)
