= Laureate Plate of Madrid =

Laureate Badge of Madrid
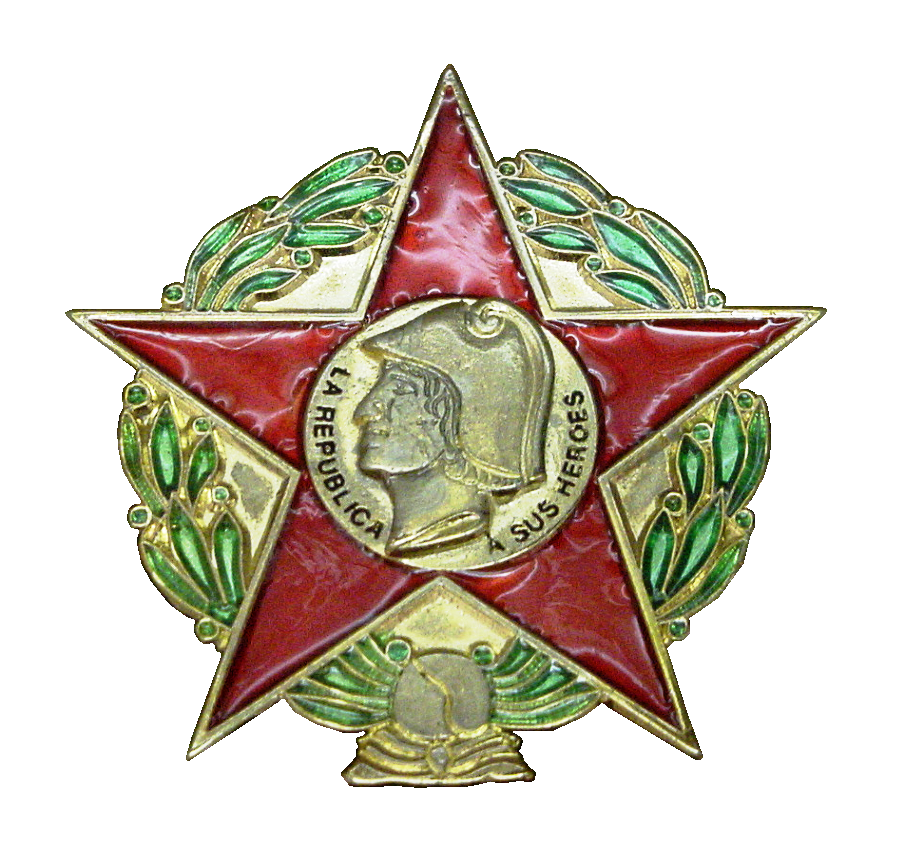
- Type: Medal
- Presented by: Second Spanish Republic
- Eligibility: Military personnel
- Status: Awarded 1937–1939
- Established: 25 May 1937

The Laureate Badge of Madrid (Spanish: Placa Laureada de Madrid) was the highest military award for gallantry of the Second Spanish Republic. It was awarded in recognition of action, either individual or collective, to protect the nation and its citizens in the face of immediate risk to the bearer or bearers' life. Those eligible were members of the Spanish Republican Armed Forces and testimonies of reliable witnesses were checked prior to concession.

Named after the capital of Spain, symbolizing courage and the defence of the Republic during the Siege of Madrid throughout the Spanish Civil War, the Laureate Badge of Madrid was established on 25 May 1937 as the Spanish Republican equivalent to the Laureate Cross of Saint Ferdinand awarded by the monarchy and the Nationalist faction.

== Awardees ==
A total of eight people were awarded this medal:

- Spanish Republican Army
  - Vicente Rojo Lluch, General of the Popular Army and Chief of the General Staff.
  - José Miaja Menant, General of the Popular Army.
  - Manuel Fontela Frois, Major of the Republican Cavalry.
  - Domiciano Leal Sargenta and Manuel Álvarez Álvarez, Majors of the Militia for their role in the Battle of the Ebro (posthumously).
- Spanish Republican Navy
  - Luis González de Ubieta, Admiral of the Republican Armada for his role in sinking heavy cruiser Baleares in the Battle of Cabo de Palos, the biggest naval battle of the Spanish Civil War.
  - Ambrosio Ristori de la Cuadra, Major of the Infantería de Marina (posthumously), for his exploits in the siege of the Alcazar and the Battle of Seseña, where he was killed in action.
- Spanish Republican Air Force
  - Leocadio Mendiola Núñez, Major of the Air Force, for services rendered (Although awarded, Mendiola never did receive the medal after the fall of the Second Spanish Republic).

== Distintivo de Madrid ==
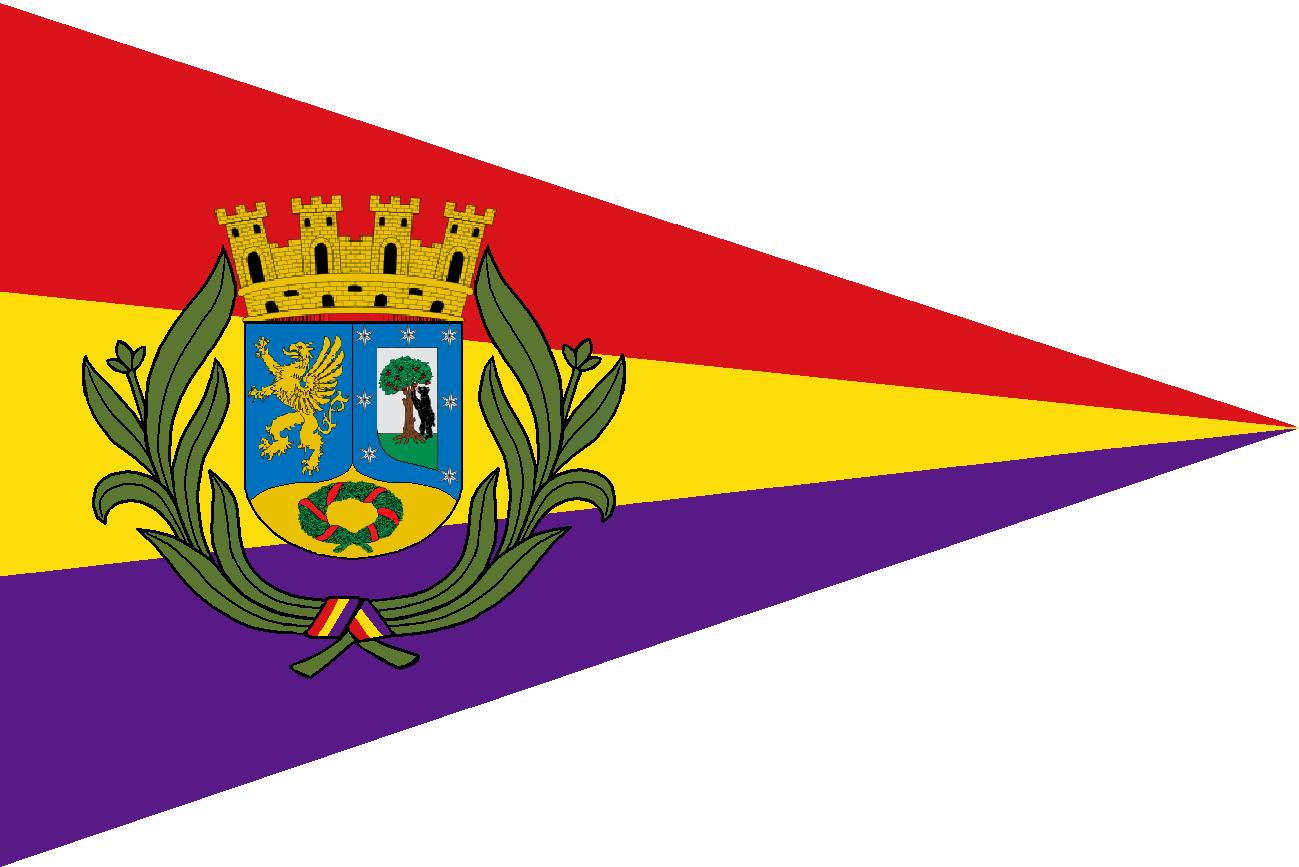
Distintivo de Madrid pennant.

The Distintivo de Madrid (Madrid Distinction) was an award related to the Laureate Plate which was established by the Second Spanish Republic in order to reward courage. It was awarded to the Spanish Republican Navy personnel and vessels that took part in the Battle of Cape Palos in January 1938.

Following the grant of the Laureate Badge of Madrid to Luis González de Ubieta, Admiral of the loyalist fleet, the Distintivo de Madrid was awarded to Spanish Republican Navy cruisers Libertad and Méndez Núñez, and destroyers Lepanto, Almirante Antequera and Sánchez Barcáiztegui, as well as to their crew members for their role in the Battle of Cape Palos. These ships would thenceforward fly a special pennant and the men would wear a special badge on their uniforms with the old coat of arms of Madrid.

== See also ==
- List of military decorations - Spain
- Order of the Spanish Republic
