= Coat of arms of Madrid =

Versions
- Escutcheon-only
- Armiger: Madrid
- Shield: Argent, a bear sable supported on a strawberry tree vert fructed gules; on a bordure azure seven stars argent

The main components of the Coat of arms of Madrid (the bear and the strawberry tree) have their origin in the Middle Ages. The different coats of arms have experienced several modifications, losing for example motifs often displayed in early designs such as water and flint.

In 1822, the municipal council adopted a design that entailed the addition of a gryphon and civic crown, which were removed in 1967.

The shield is argent, a bear sable supported on a strawberry tree vert fructed gules; on a bordure azure seven stars argent. The shield is adorned with a large open royal crown of gold and precious stones, with eight rosettes (five visible) alternating with eight pearls; this crown is commonly used in Spanish heraldry for territorial and municipal arms.

The image of the seven stars, the bear and the strawberry tree is also a component of the badge of the local football club Atlético Madrid.

== History ==
According to chronicles, the militias of the council of Madrid carried a banner identified them in different battles of the early 13th century: a bear sable (prieto) on a field argent.

In the early 13th century, the Clerical cabildo vied against the municipal council over the use of the fodder in the fields and forests of El Real de Manzanares. In 1222, the fodder was determined to belong to the clergymen, whereas the forests would pertain to the council. The bear, which formerly had been displayed on all fours, began to stand on its hind legs leaning on a tree in council representations, possibly underpinning the control of timber by the council, whereas the cabildo's bear in cabildo emblems remained walking.

There are several hypotheses regarding the beginnings of the identification of the tree with a strawberry tree (Arbutus unedo), be it a Arbutus/Arbustus confusion the improbable abundance of the species in Madrid (unlike that of Celtis australis), or perhaps an attempt to improve on the gaudiness or the composition.

A recent study by heraldist Dario Scaricamazza proposes that the convergence of historical, linguistic, and heraldic evidence establishes the canting character of the strawberry tree ("madr-oño"), while the she-bear constitutes the non-canting component. Scaricamazza thereby classifies the coat of arms of Madrid as a semi-canting coat of arms.

History of the coat of arms of Madrid
Coat of arms	Shield	Dates	Details
		c.1212-1222	In 1212, the Council of Madrid used an ensign that shown a bear with the seven stars of the Ursa Major or Ursa Minor. This flag was used in the Battle of Las Navas de Tolosa by Madrilenian troops. A later and widely spread representation of the arms of Madrid depicts two mistakes: a shield with a shape used since the 16th century and five-pointed stars Argent (white or light grey), instead of eight pointed commonly used by the Madrid Council at that time.
		1222-1544	The bear, which had been displayed pascuant (grazing), now stood on its hind legs, rampant, to eat fruits from a tree and the seven eight-pointed stars where shown on a bordure Azure (blue).
		1544-c.1600	In 1544 Charles I granted to Madrid the titles of "Imperial" and "Crowned" for this reason, a crown was added on the shield above the tree.
		c.1600-c.1650	In the 17th century the open Spanish royal crown set upon the shield.
		c.1650-1859	Circa 1650 stars set 2, 2, 2 and 1 changing to 3, 2 and 2. Consoles became a common external ornament.
		1859-1873 / 1874-1931	In 1859 were added a griffin rampant Or (golden) and a civic crown, awarded by the Cortes for the heroism of the people of Madrid against the French occupation in 1808. The griffin has its origin in a dragon, or a serpent according to Mesonero Romanos, that was shown on the keystone in the arch of a gate of the disappeared walls of Madrid known as "Puerta Cerrada" or "Puerta de la Sierpe" (Closed Gate or Serpent Gate in English). In 1582 a fire destroyed the gate. At that time the walls had fallen into disuse, for this reason the gate and the surrounding wall have never been rebuilt. The serpent, become dragon, was retained as informal symbol of Madrid until the 19th century, when it was decided to incorporate the dragon that very soon turned into a griffin. Eight-pointed stars were replaced by five-pointed stars and the open royal crown was changed by the Spanish royal crown closed with eight arches. Consoles, laurel wreaths and the collar of the Order of the Golden Fleece were common ornaments.
		1873-1874 / 1931-1939	During the First and Second Republics, the royal crown was replaced by a mural crown and the collar of the dynastic Order of the Golden Fleece was removed. In March 1938, following the Battle of Cape Palos, the biggest naval battle of the Spanish Civil War, the Distintivo de Madrid, which had been established by the Second Spanish Republic in order to reward courage, was given to Spanish Republican Navy cruisers Libertad and Méndez Núñez, and destroyers Lepanto, Almirante Antequera and Sánchez Barcáiztegui, as well as to their crew members. These ships would thenceforward fly a special pennant and the men would wear a special badge on their uniforms with the coat of arms of Madrid.
		1939-1967	In the Francoist period, the five-pointed stars became six-pointed stars and the mural crown was replaced by the heraldic open crown used by Franco's regime. Consoles and laurel wreaths became unusual.
		1967-1982	In 1967 the griffin and the civic crown were removed.
		1982–Present	In 1982 the heraldic open crown used by Franco's regime was replaced by the older open royal crown. The design of the elements has become more simplified and the escutcheon shape has been changed too.

== Gallery ==
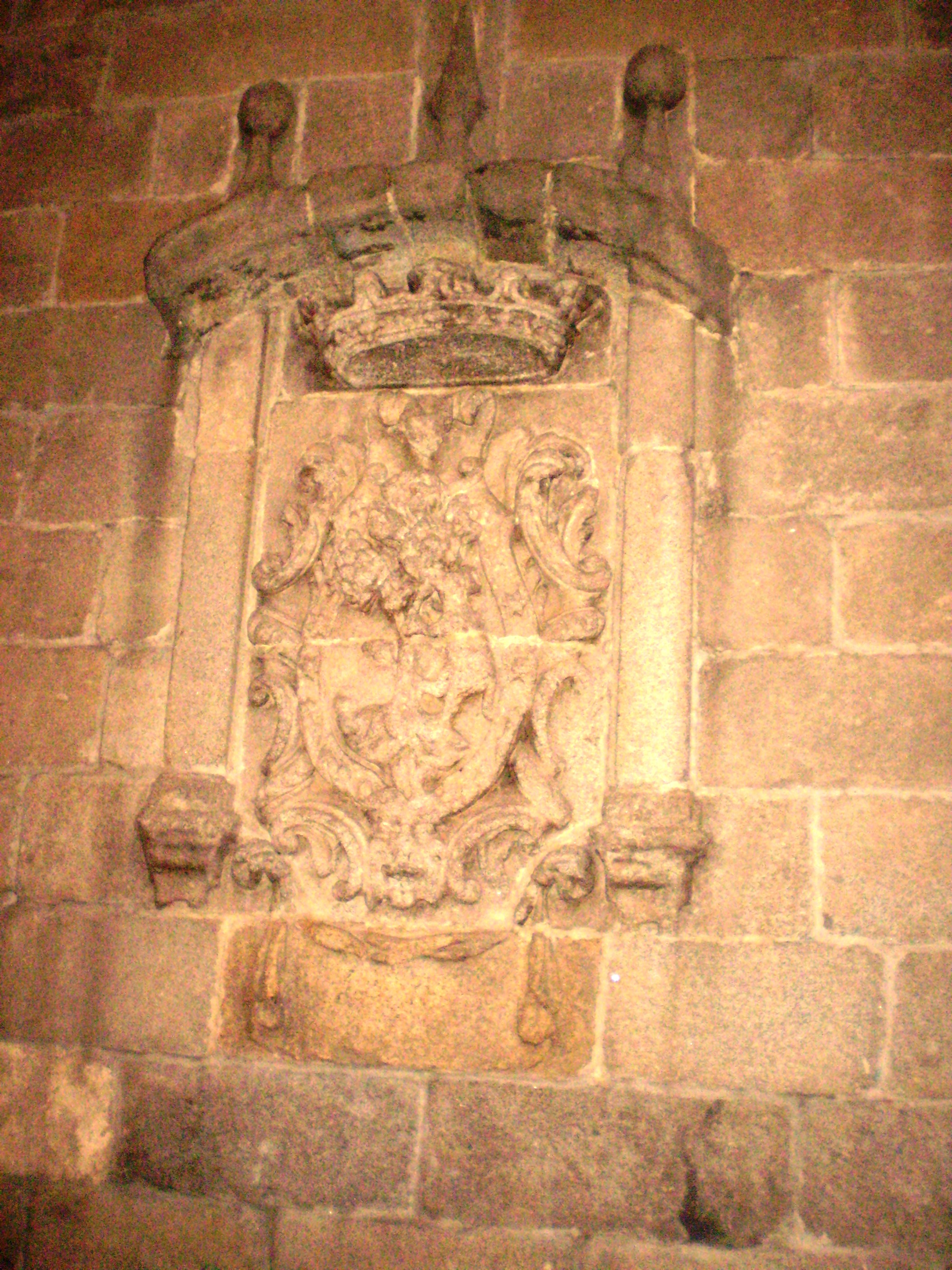
Coat in la Casa del Pastor, in calle de Segovia, considered as the oldest in the city

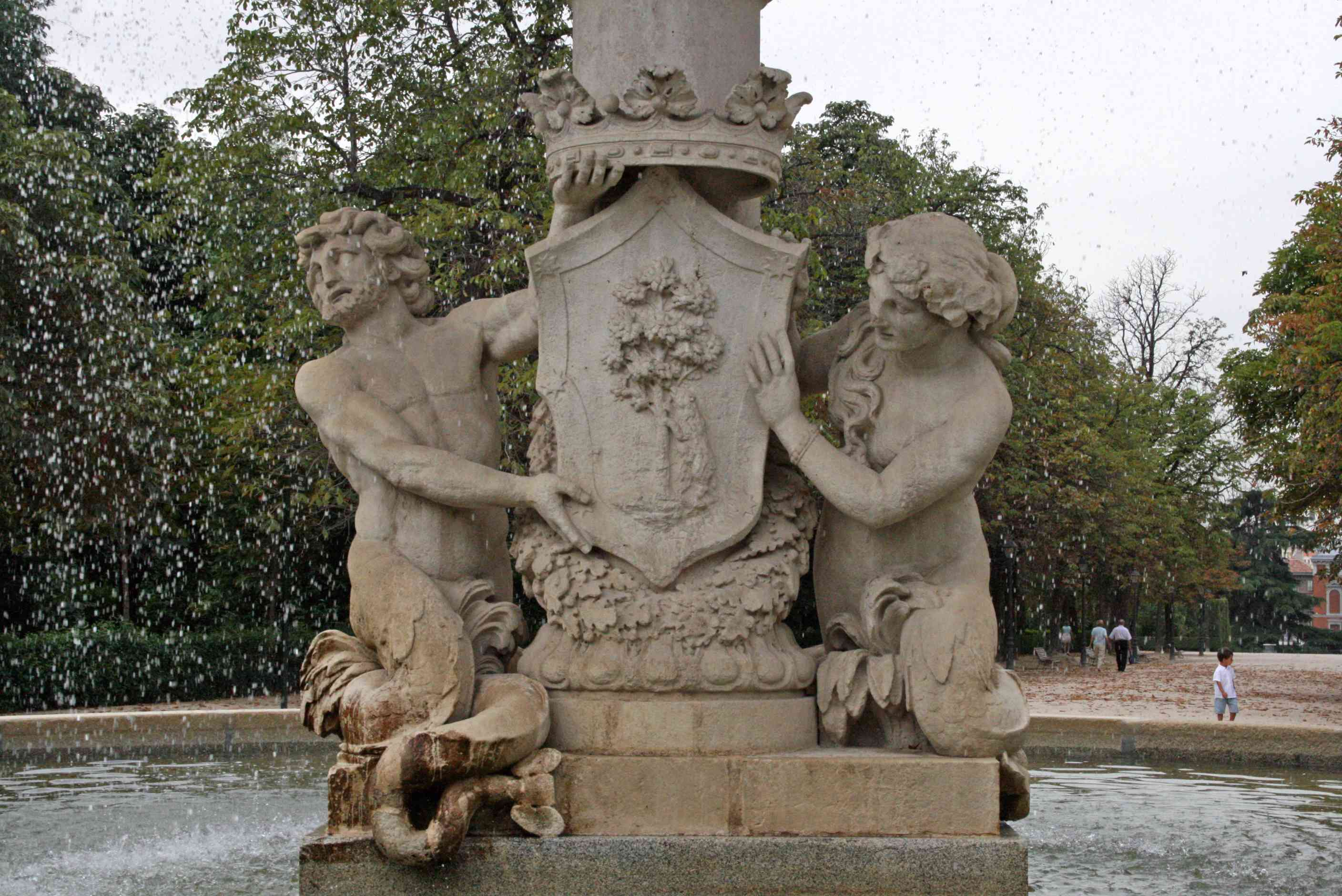
Historic coat of arms in Alcachofa Fountain, Retiro Park

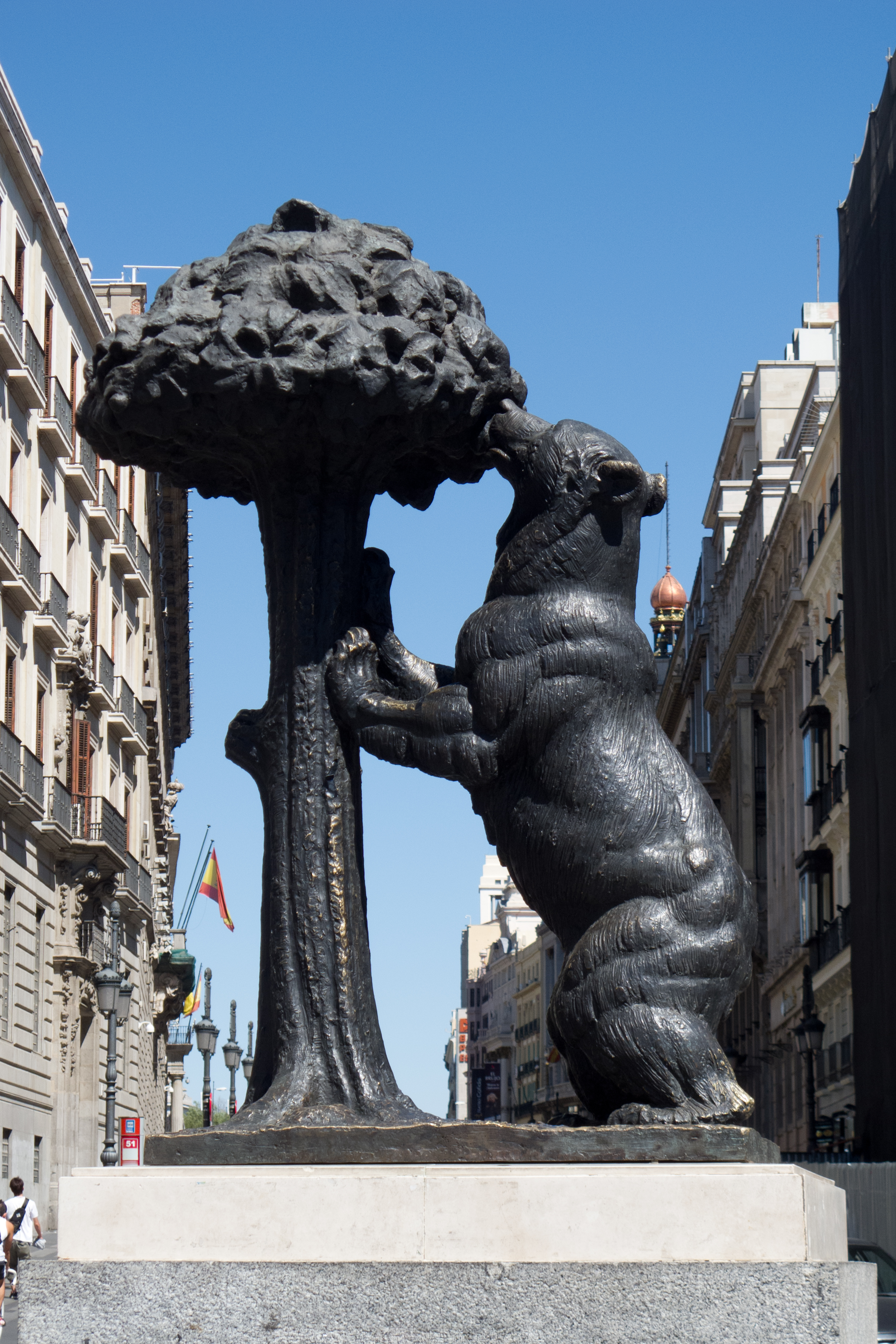
The Statue of the Bear and the Strawberry Tree in Madrid, by Antonio Navarro Santafé

Logotype used as common emblem by the City Council

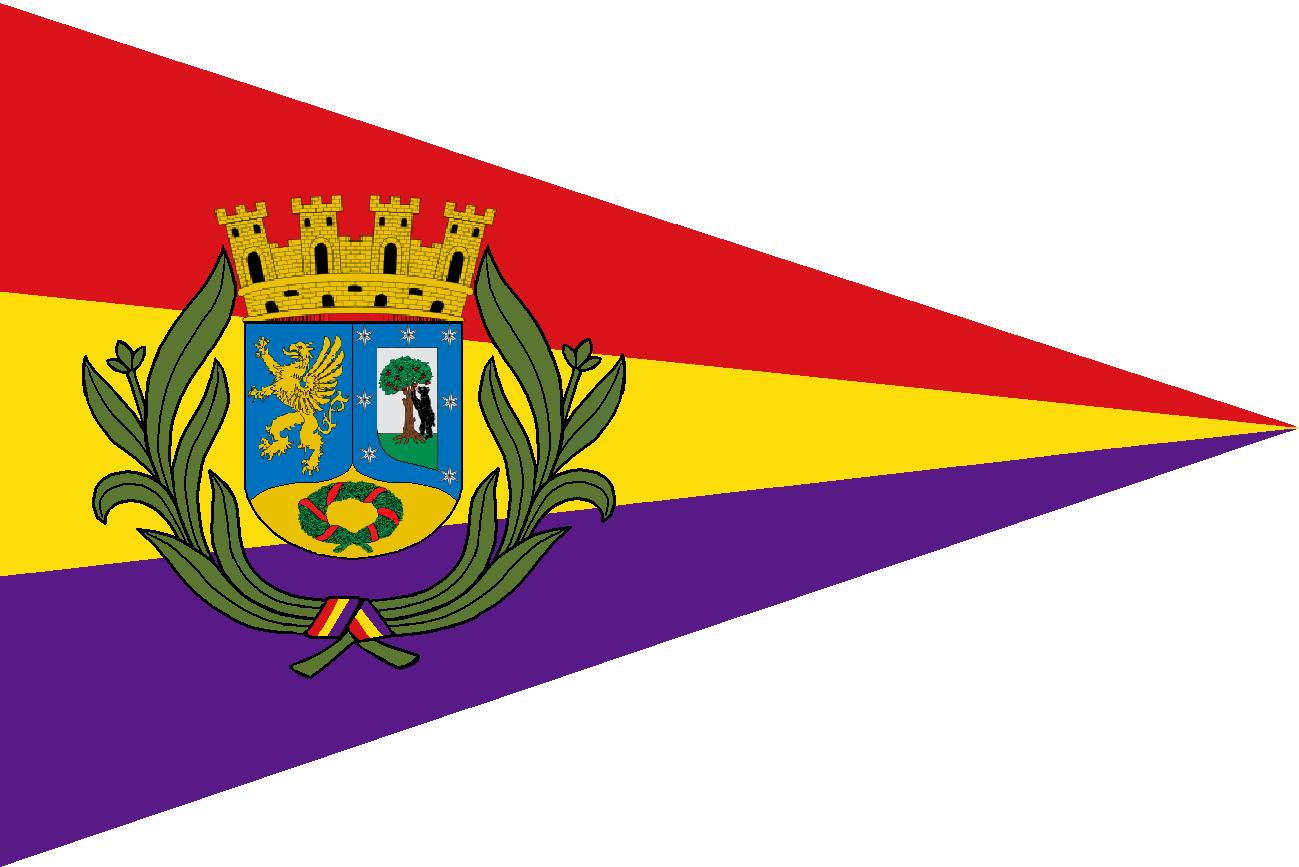
Distintivo de Madrid pennant awarded to the Spanish Republican Navy vessels that took part in the Battle of Cape Palos

== See also ==
- Coats of arms of the Community and historic province of Madrid
- Spanish heraldry
