= Madrid Distinction =

Distintivo de Madrid
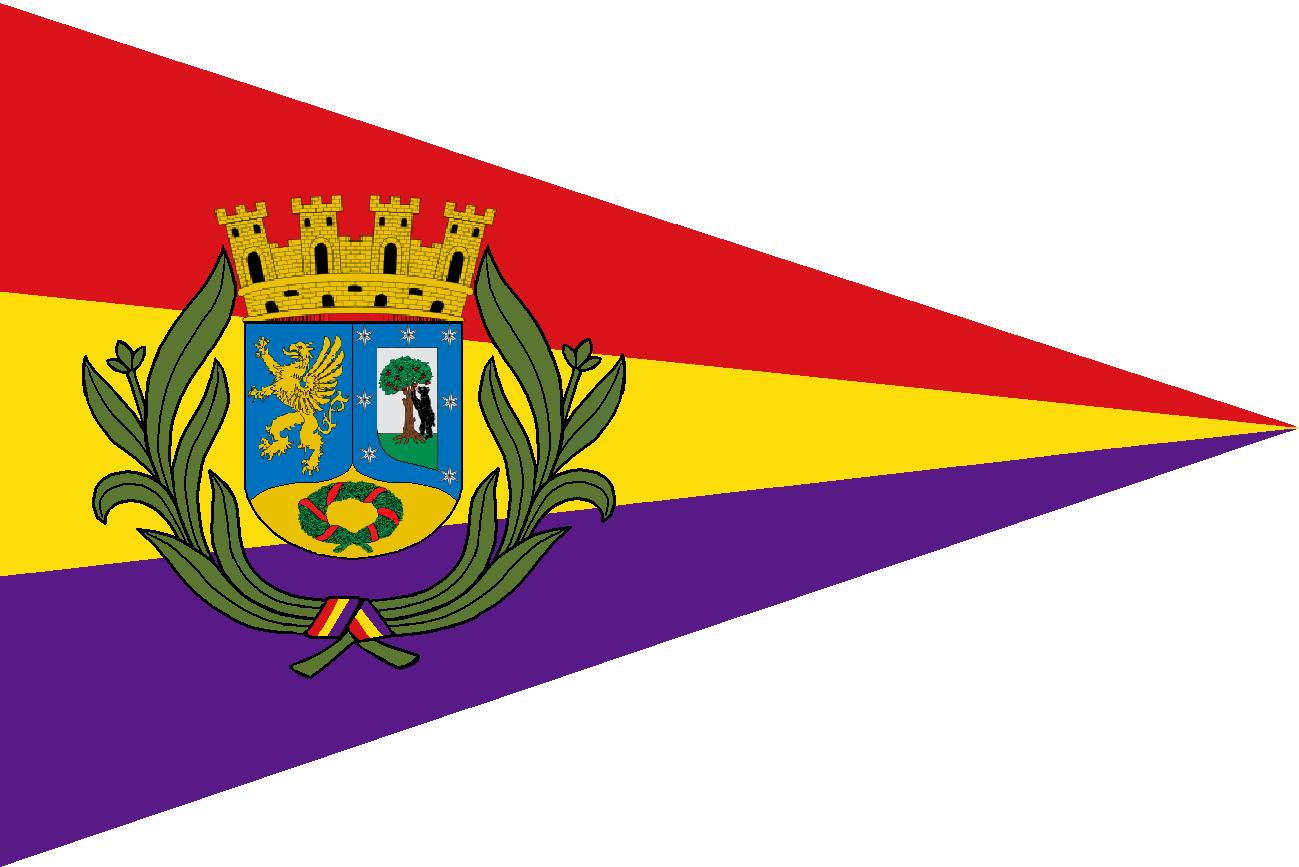
- Pennant
- Type: Badge
- Awarded for: Valour
- Presented by: the Spanish Republic
- Eligibility: Ships and personnel of the Spanish Republican Navy
- Status: Awarded 1938–1939
- Established: 23 January 1938

The Madrid Distinction (Spanish: Distintivo de Madrid) was one of the highest military awards of the Second Spanish Republic. It was a decoration related to the Laureate Plate of Madrid. which was established by the Second Spanish Republic in order to reward courage. In the same manner as the Laureate Plate of Madrid, it was named after Madrid, the capital of Spain, owing to the city symbolizing valour and the defence of the Second Spanish Republic during the long Siege of Madrid, which lasted from November 1936 through March 1939 during the Spanish Civil War. Unlike the Laureate Plate of Madrid, the Distintivo de Madrid displayed the former coat of arms of Madrid and not the red star, a symbol often associated with communist ideology.

== History ==
The Distintivo de Madrid was established on 23 January 1938, It was first awarded to certain warships of the Spanish Republican Navy as well as to their crew members for their role in the Battle of Cape Palos of 5–6 March 1938. The admiral commanding the Spanish Republican Navy, Luis González de Ubieta, received the Laureate Plate of Madrid for the same action.

The Spanish Civil War ended in April 1939 with the defeat of the Second Spanish Republic by the National faction and the establishment of Francoist Spain, which meant the end of the short existence of the Madrid Distinction.

== Awardees ==
=== Ships ===
The following Spanish Republican Navy ships flew the Distintivo de Madrid special pennant.

- Light cruiser Libertad
- Light cruiser Méndez Núñez
- Destroyer Almirante Antequera
- Destroyer Lepanto
- Destroyer Sánchez Barcáiztegui

=== Personnel ===
All the crew members of the ships that took part in the Cape Palos naval battle were awarded the Distintivo de Madrid. They were issued a special cloth badge to wear on their uniforms.

== See also ==
- List of military decorations - Spain
- Laureate Plate of Madrid
- Order of the Spanish Republic
- Flag of the Second Spanish Republic
