= Battle of Minorca (1939) =

Spanish Civil War battle

Battle of Menorca
- Part of the Spanish Civil War
- Balearic islands. Menorca in blue
Date	7–9 February 1939
Location	Menorca, Balearic Islands, Spain
Result	Nationalist victory: Surrender of the Republican garrison.; Evacuation of Republican soldiers and civilians by the British heavy cruiser HMS Devonshire; Nationalist occupation of Menorca.

Belligerents
Spanish Republic	Nationalist Spain

Commanders and leaders
(Second Spanish Republic) Luis González de Ubieta (surrendered) (Second Spanish Republic) Marcelino Rodríguez †	(Francoist Spain) Cpt. Fernando Sartorius y Díaz de Mendoza (Francoist Spain) Col. Alfonso Useleti; Maj. Pedro Pons; Lt. Juan Thomas (WIA)

Strength
1 brigade	3 battalions

The Battle of Menorca was a battle that took place in Menorca during the Spanish Civil War between 7 and 9 February 1939. It was one of the last battles of the war and the last confrontation in the Balearic Islands.

== Background ==
By 1939, the island of Menorca was the only Balearic island held by the Republicans, who were losing the war. After the Catalonia Offensive, a naval blockade by the Nationalists isolated the island from other Republican-held territory. Francisco Franco informed the British government that Italian troops would abandon the Balearic Islands after the war, and Britain agreed to arrange the surrender of the Republican garrison.

== The uprising ==
On 8 January 1939, Admiral Luis González de Ubieta was transferred to Menorca to take the command of the Spanish Republican Navy base at Puerto Mahon. He also was given the authority to command all the Republican military forces on the island.

On 7 February, the Royal Navy cruiser HMS Devonshire arrived in Mahón harbour with a Nationalist emissary, Fernando Sartorius, on board. Sartorius said to Ubieta that the Nationalist forces would occupy Menorca the next day, but Republican officers and supporters could abandon the island beforehand. The same day, three battalions of the Republican garrison led by officer Juan Thomas, a member of a Nationalist fifth column, occupied the Ciutadella after killing the Republican commander Marcelino Rodríguez. One brigade of Republican troops arrived from Mahon, defeating the rebel troops after a brief engagement and surrounding Ciutadella. Nevertheless, the Republican officers, convinced that any resistance under those circumstances was pointless, asked for safe passage to the mainland. The British eventually arranged the surrender of Menorca to the Nationalists onboard Devonshire. On 8 February, Italian and Nationalist bombers attacked Mahón. On the same day, Devonshire sailed to Marseille with 452 Republican refugees on board. On 9 February, the 105th division of the Nationalist Army disembarked at Ciutadella and the remaining Republican troops surrendered.

== Aftermath ==
After the surrender of Menorca, many Republican officers in the central zone of mainland Spain believed that they would negotiate a deal with the Nationalists, and then started to plan a coup against the Republican government of Juan Negrín.

== See also ==
- List of Spanish Republican military equipment of the Spanish Civil War
- List of Spanish Nationalist military equipment of the Spanish Civil War
- Aviazione Legionaria
