= Order of the Spanish Republic =

2nd Spanish Republic for civil and military merit to the state

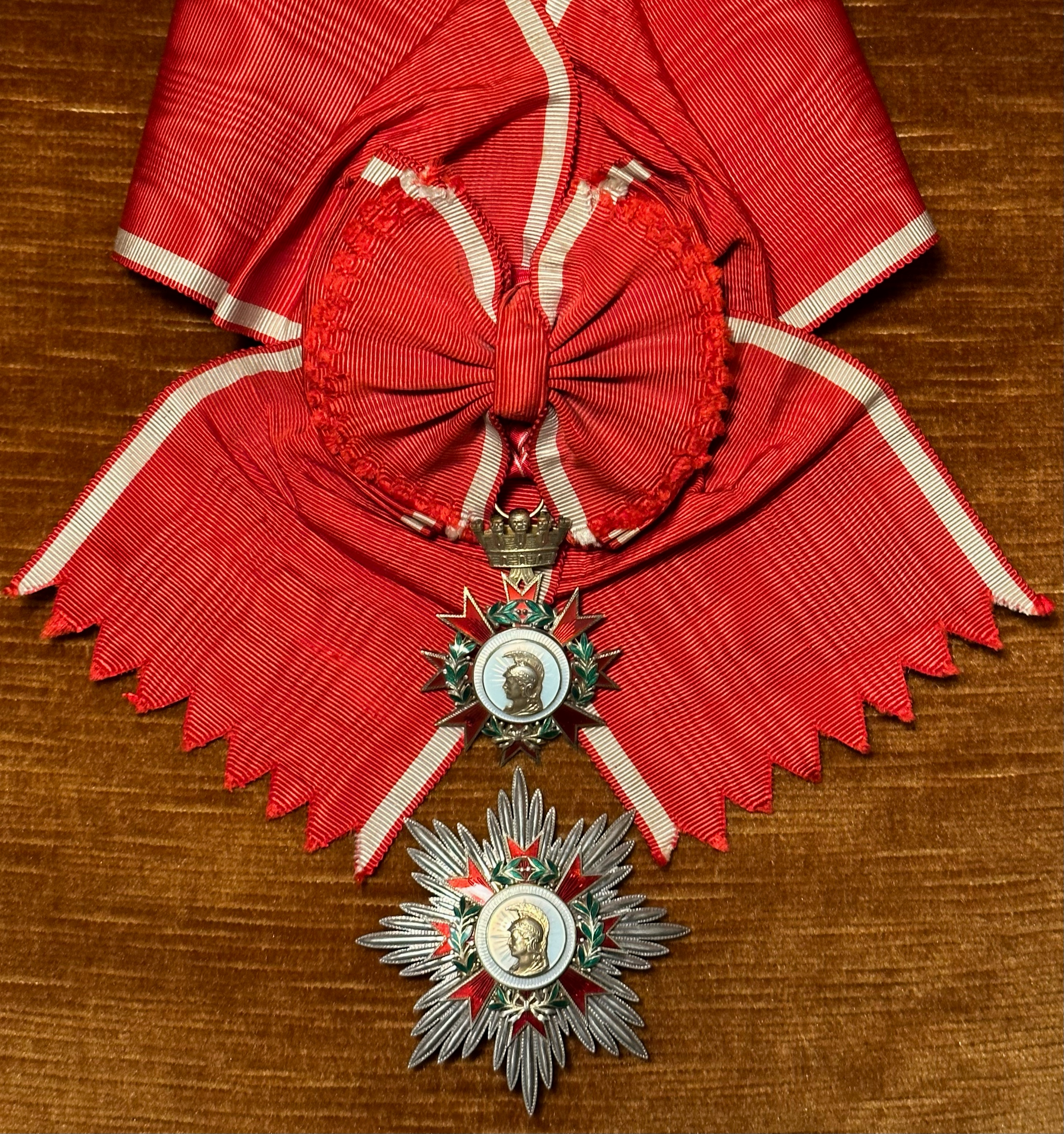
- Grand Cross of the Order

Awarded by President of the Spanish Republic
- Type: State Order
- Established: 21 July 1932
- Eligibility: To all those people who would have benefited the Republic and the Spanish people with their merits and personal works in the exercise of their profession
- Status: Abolished

Precedence
- Next (higher): Order of Isabella the Catholic
- Next (lower): Order of Africa
- Ribbon of the Order

The Order of the Spanish Republic (Spanish: "Orden de la República Española") was founded in 1932 in the Second Spanish Republic for civil and military merit to the state. It replaced the orders of merit of the former Spanish Monarchy and had the mural crown instead of the royal one.

The order had the usual five degrees. There was a special collar for heads of state and two medals were attached to this order of merit. The ribbon was red with a white border.

After the military defeat of the Spanish Republic, Gen. Francisco Franco abolished all Republican Orders and instituted new ones.

== Gallery ==
Insignia of the Order
Insignia of the Collar of the Order of the Spanish Republic				
Collar	Collar Cross	Grand-Cross	Grand-Cross Band	Commander Cross
Officer's Cross	Cross	Silver Medal	Bronze Medal	Collective Plate (created in 1934)

== See also ==
- Laureate Plate of Madrid
- Madrid Distinction
