= Statue of the Bear and the Strawberry Tree =

Public sculpture in Madrid

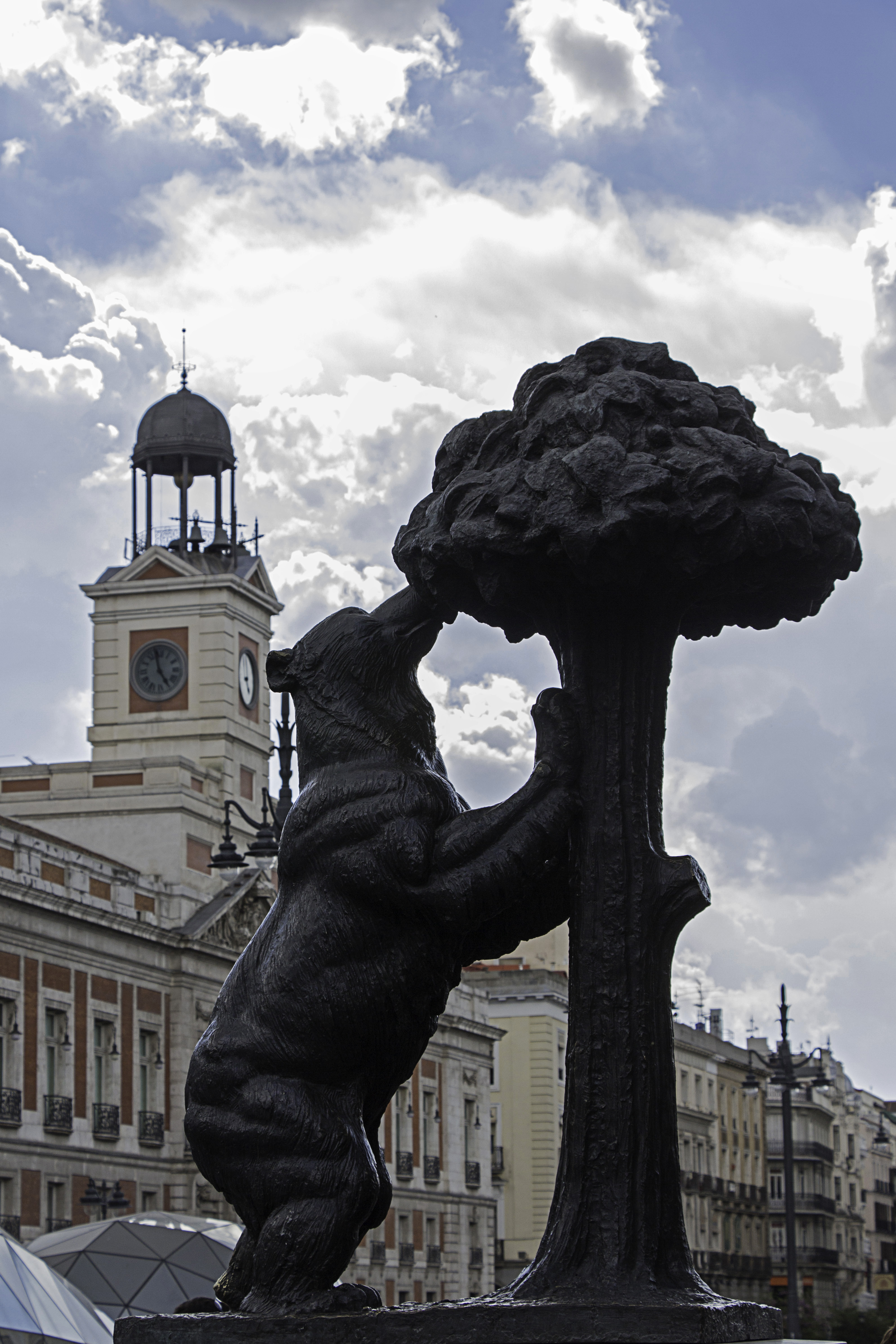
- Interactive map of Statue of the Bear and the Strawberry Tree
- Location: Puerta del Sol, Madrid, Spain
- Coordinates: 40.417°N 3.7024°W
- Designer: Antonio Navarro Santafé
- Type: Statue
- Material: Stone and bronze
- Height: 4 metres (13 ft)
- Opening date: 19 January 1967

The Statue of the Bear and the Strawberry Tree (Spanish: El Oso y el Madroño) is a sculpture from the second half of the 20th century, situated in the Spanish capital, Madrid. It represents the coat of arms of Madrid and is found on the east side of the Puerta del Sol, between Calle de Alcalá and Carrera de San Jerónimo, in the historical centre of the capital.

== History ==
The statue is a work of the sculptor Antonio Navarro Santafé (1906-1983) and it was inaugurated on 19 January 1967. It was promoted by the section of Culture of the City council of Madrid, which wanted to represent the main heraldic symbols of the city in a monument.

The first appearance of a wild bear and a strawberry tree on the coat of arms of the city was in the 13th century. Previously, it only incorporated a bear in passant attitude, until it was replaced in the aforementioned century by the two current figures. With this change, they wanted to symbolise the resolution adopted by the municipality and the Chapter of Priests and Beneficiaries after a long litigation about the control of Madrilenian pastures and trees. As a result of this part, the pastures became property of the Chapter and the trees bécame property of the council. From here they modified the coat of arms, including a strawberry tree and a bear in a new posture: leaning on the tree with both paws.

The sculpture has always been in the Puerta del Sol, but has had two locations in the square. Until 1986, it was placed on the east side of the square, in the vicinity of the building between Calle de Alcalá and Carrera St. Jerónimo. That year, it was moved to the front of Carmen Street due to the square's reform and remodelling, promoted by mayor Enrique Tierno Galván. In September 2009, with the integral renewal of the square promoted by Alberto Ruiz-Gallardón, it was relocated back to its original location.

Tourists and visitors have taken up the habit of touching the bear's tail or heel, repeating the gesture that is performed in similar sculptures around the world with the thought that doing so brings good luck. However, there are no historical references to it being a typical Madrilenian tradition. This gesture causes the bear's tail and heel to discolor, which encourages other tourists to repeat the gesture thinking it is something that is done in a traditional way.

== Description ==
The Statue of the Bear and the Strawberry Tree is made of stone and bronze. It weighs approximately 22 tons (20 tonnes) and stands 13 ft (4 m) tall. It rests on a staggered cubic pedestal of granite.

It represents in a real-life form the coat of arms of Madrid, with the tree taller than the bear, who leans its paws on the trunk and directs its attention towards one of the fruits.

The bear's heel and tail are discolored due to tourists and visitors touching it.

== See also ==
- Shield of Madrid
- Flag of Madrid
