= Spanish cruiser Méndez Núñez =

Spanish cruiser of 1924–1963

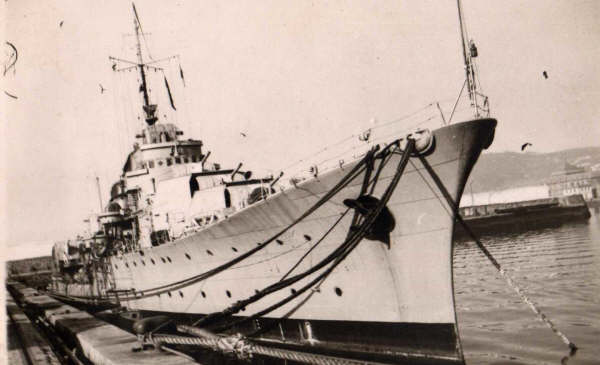
- Méndez Núñez as an anti-aircraft cruiser during the 1950s.

History

Spain
- Name: Blas de Lezo
- Namesake: Blas de Lezo y Olavarrieta (1689–1741), Spanish admiral
- Operator: Spanish Navy
- Builder: SECN, Ferrol, Spain
- Laid down: May 1915
- Launched: 27 July 1922
- Renamed: Méndez Núñez May 1924
- Namesake: Casto Méndez Núñez (1824–1869), Spanish admiral
- Commissioned: 30 August 1924
- Decommissioned: December 1963
- Honors and awards: Madrid Distinction 1937
- Fate: Sold January 1964; Scrapped 1964
- Notes: Converted into anti-aircraft cruiser 1943–1947

General characteristics (as light cruiser)
- Displacement: 4,780 long tons (4,860 t) standard; 6,045 long tons (6,142 t) full load
- Length: 140.82 m (462 ft 0 in) overall; 134.11 m (440 ft 0 in) between perpendiculars
- Beam: 14.02 m (46 ft 0 in)
- Height: 7.72 m (25 ft 4 in)
- Draught: 5.6 m (18 ft 4 in) maximum
- Installed power: 45,000 hp (33,556 kW)
- Propulsion: Four Parsons geared turbines, 12 Yarrow boilers, four shafts
- Speed: 29 knots (54 km/h)
- Range: 5,000 nmi (9,300 km; 5,800 mi) at 13 knots (24 km/h; 15 mph)
- Complement: 320
- Armament: As built: 6 × 152 mm (6 in) guns in single mounts (removed 1939); 4 × 47mm guns; Added 1930: 12 × 533 mm (21 in) torpedo tubes in four triple mounts
- Armour: Belt 76–51 mm (3–2 in); Deck 25 mm (1 in); Conning tower 25 mm (1 in)

General characteristics (as anti-aircraft cruiser)
- Displacement: 6,312 long tons (6,413 t) full load
- Length: 142.3 m (466 ft 10 in)
- Beam: 13.86 m (45 ft 6 in)
- Draught: 5.4 m (17 ft 9 in)
- Installed power: 45,000 hp (33,556 kW)
- Propulsion: Four Parsons geared turbines, 12 Yarrow boilers, four shafts
- Speed: 29 knots (54 km/h)
- Range: 5,300 nmi (9,800 km; 6,100 mi) at 10 knots (19 km/h; 12 mph)
- Complement: 320
- Armament: 8 x 120 mm (4.7 in) guns in single mounts; 8 x 37 mm in four twin mounts; 8 x 20mm guns in two quad mounts; 6 × 533 mm (21 in) torpedoes in two triple mounts; 4 x anti-submarine mortars; 1 x depth charge rack; 6 x depth charges
- Armour: Belt 76–51 mm (3–2 in); Deck 25 mm (1 in); Conning tower 25 mm (1 in)

Méndez Núñez was a Spanish Navy Blas de Lezo-class light cruiser commissioned in 1924. She served the Kingdom of Spain until 1931, seeing action in the Rif War. She then served the Second Spanish Republic from 1931 to 1939, operating in support of the Republican faction as part of the Spanish Republican Navy during the Spanish Civil War of 1936–1939, and was present at the Battle of Cape Cherchell and the Battle of Cape Palos. After the Nationalist victory in 1939, she served in the reunified Spanish Navy of Francoist Spain and was reconstructed as an anti-aircraft cruiser between 1943 and 1947. She took part in the Ifni War of 1957–1958. She was decommissioned in 1963 and scrapped in 1964.

== Characteristics ==
The Blas de Lezo-class ships were ordered as "fast cruisers" inspired by the design of the British C-class light cruisers. They were slower than the C-class, however, which in service proved to be their main limitation as combat ships, and they were reclassified as light cruisers as a result.

The ships were 134.11 metres (440 ft 0 in) long between perpendiculars and 140.82 metres (462 ft 0 in) long overall. They had a beam of 14.02 metres (46 ft 0 in), a maximum draft of 5.6 metres (18 ft 4 in), and a height of 7.72 metres (25 ft 4 in). Their standard displacement was 4,780 tons, and they displaced 6,045 tons at full load.

The ships were armed with six Vickers 152-millimetre (6 in) guns in single mounts, two forward, two aft, one on either side amidships, as well as four 47-millimetre (1.9 in) anti-aircraft guns located along the sides between the funnels. In 1930, twelve 533-millimetre (21 in) torpedo tubes of in four triple mounts were installed.

The propulsion system, which consisted of four sets of Parsons turbines, six coal-fired Yarrow boilers, six oil-fired Yarrow boilers, generated 43,000 horsepower (32,065 kW) and drove four propellers. The ships had a maximum speed of 29 knots (54 km/h; 33 mph). The fuel capacity was 730 tons of fuel oil and 800 tons of coal, giving the ships a range of 5,000 nautical miles (9,300 km; 5,800 mi) at an economical cruising speed of 13 knots (24 km/h; 15 mph).

The ships were armored, with 50 to 75 millimetres (2.0 to 3.0 in) of belt armor, 25 millimetres (0.98 in) of deck armor, and a conning tower with 152 millimetres (6 in) of armor. Each ship had a crew of 320 men.

== Construction and commissioning ==
Méndez Núñez as a light cruiser in 1932.

The Spanish Cortes Generales approved the construction of four "fast cruisers" on 17 February 1915. The first two became the Blas de Lezo-class ships, while the second pair became the ships of the Almirante Cervera-class class. Spanish budgetary problems and a shortage of raw materials during World War I (1914–1918) delayed construction of the ships.

Méndez Núñez was laid down in May 1915 by the Sociedad Española de Construcción Naval (SECN, English: Spanish Naval Construction Society) at Ferrol, Spain, with the name Blas de Lezo as the first ship of the Blas de Lezo class, and was launched on 27 July 1922. While she was fitting out, an order of May 1924 swapped her name with that of the first ship of the class, previously known as Méndez Núñez, so that the first ship's commissioning in 1924 could honor the centenary of Contralmirante (Counter Admiral) Casto Méndez Núñez.

Now named Méndez Núñez, the first ship left Ferrol on 1 July 1924 to conduct speed and fuel consumption tests, remaining at sea for 24 hours using coal and fuel oil. She carried out more tests on 9 July. She conducted more speed and fuel consumption tests on 10 July 1924 with a Spanish Navy inspection committee aboard and reached a speed of 30 knots (56 km/h; 35 mph), and on 11 July carried out the last tests required by contract. Her armament was installed in August 1924. On the morning of 12 August 1924 she left Ferrol for gunnery tests, returning to port that night. The shipyard officially delivered to the Spanish Navy at Ferrol on 30 August 1924.

== Service history ==
=== Kingdom of Spain ===
==== 1925–1927 ====
Méndez Núñez′s first voyage in naval service was in September 1924 to Santander and San Sebastián, where the Spanish royal family visited her. On 29 January 1925, she left Ferrol for gunnery exercises at Marín. After completing them, she proceeded to Cádiz, which she reached on the afternoon of 7 February 1925. On 14 February, she got back underway and arrived at Santa Pola at 17:00 the same day. On 15 February 1925 she put back to sea in company with the transport Contramaestre Casado bound for Cartagena.

Méndez Núñez, the battleship Alfonso XIII, and the destroyers Alsedo and Velasco conducted gunnery exercises off Santa Pola on 18 February 1925. Méndez Núñez arrived at Barcelona on the morning of 26 May 1925 to attend a visit to the city by King Alfonso XIII. The King embarked aboard her on the morning of 29 May. She arrived at Castellón de la Plana on 30 May with General Miguel Primo de Rivera aboard. She left Alicante on the night of 3 June 1925 bound for Cádiz, and she joined the Spanish squadron in the Bay of Gibraltar in June.

Méndez Núñez, her sister ship Blas de Lezo, Alsedo, and Velasco were at Ceuta on the coast of North Africa in mid-July 1925 when they departed for Ferrol, Spain. They then proceeded to Santander and San Sebastián. On 27 July 1925 the four ships arrived at Santander, where King Alfonso XIII received them. A French Navy squadron consisting of two battleships and two destroyers also arrived at Santander. The Spanish royal family and both light cruisers were on hand at Santander on 3 August 1925 when Alsedo and Velasco were presented with their battle ensigns, acquired by popular subscription. On 5 August 1925 the two light cruisers arrived at Málaga, and on 11 August they were back at Ferrol. After refueling, they got underway on 13 August bound for the coast of Spanish Morocco, where Spanish forces had been fighting Rifians in the Rif War since 1921. They rendezvoused with the Training Squadron in the Bay of Gibraltar at 17:00 on 19 August 1925.

In September 1925, the Spanish Navy assembled two squadrons for the Alhucemas landing during the ongoing Rif War. The Training Squadron was one of them, and it gathered at Ceuta. Consisting of Alfonso XIII, the battleship Jaime I, Méndez Núñez, Blas de Lezo, Alsedo, and Velasco, the Training Squadron left Ceuta on 6 September and disembarked Spanish Army troops in an amphibious landing on Cebadilla Beach west of Al Hoceima (Spanish: Alhucemas) on 8 September. On 11 September, Méndez Núñez carried out a diversionary operation off Uad Lau, and she repeated the operation over the following days with other warships. While supporting the Alhucemas landing, she fired 1,750 shells, and enemy fire hit her on several occasions on 9 and 17 September. She left Cala del Quemado on the night of 21 November 1925 and proceeded to Cartagena to refuel.

After gunnery exercises off Santa Pola in mid-April 1926, Méndez Núñez, Alfonso XIII, and Jaime I put into port at Tarragona. The three ships departed Cartagena on 20 May 1926 in company with Blas de Lezo, Velasco, and the destroyer Lazaga for exercises off Mazarrón. They called at Málaga on 21 May, then proceeded to Al Hoceima. In late June 1926, Méndez Núñez arrived at Ferrol. In early July 1926, Méndez Núñez, Alfonso XIII, and Jaime I arrived at Marín. After a week of gunnery practice, the two battleships returned to Ferrol on 9 July, and Méndez Núñez arrived there on 14 July 1926.

Méndez Núñez left Ferrrol on 30 July 1926 for a voyage to Vigo and Santander. She was at Santander in early August 1926 while King Alfonso XIII and Queen Victoria Eugenie visited Spain's northern coast. On 26 August Blas de Lezo left Ferrol to relieve Méndez Núñez in the Cantabrian Sea, and at 09:00 that day Méndez Núñez returned to Ferrol. She got back underway on 28 August bound for Marín and on 29 August arrived at Vigo with Minister of the Navy Honorio Cornejo Carvajal aboard. She received her battle ensign there on the morning of 30 August 1926. In mid-September 1926 she departed Ferrol to proceed to Barcelona, where she received a squadron of Italian Regia Marina (Royal Navy) destroyers that made a visit there. On 12 October 1926 she was at Ferrol with Alfonso XIII, Jaime I, Blaz de Lezo, the light cruiser Reina Victoria Eugenia, and a number of minor warships and auxiliary ships.

On 29 December 1926 Méndez Núñez′s commanding officer committed suicide in his cabin because of a chronic illness. His successor died in the first week of January 1927 while Méndez Núñez was at Ferrol. Before the end of January she was assigned her third commanding officer in a month, and he reported aboard on 2 February 1927. She began a month of repairs at Ferrol in early March 1927. In mid-June 1927 she conducted gunnery exercises off Marín with Alfonso XIII and Jaime I. After a stop at Corcubión, Méndez Núñez arrived at Vigo on 7 July 1927 as part of a squadron that also included the two battleships, Reina Victoria Eugenia, and two torpedo boats. After gunnery practice a few days later in the Pontevedra estuary, the battleships headed back to Ferrol and Méndez Núñez proceeded to San Sebastián. In June and July 1927 Méndez Núñez took part in exercises off Galicia with the Training Squadron, forming a cruiser division with Reina Victoria Eugenia. After completing them, she visited several ports on the northern coast of Spain. The two cruisers called at Vigo from 12 to 15 August 1927 to refuel, then proceeded to Santander.

On 1 September 1927, King Alfonso XIII and Queen Victoria Eugenie embarked on Méndez Núñez at Santander for a voyage to Bilbao, where they took part in the Balandros regatta. Méndez Núñez departed Bilbao on 6 September to rejoin the squadron. On 18 September, Méndez Núñez, Alfonso XIII, and Reina Victoria Eugenia escorted the king and queen as they arrived at Vigo aboard Jaime I. The king and queen subsequently visited several ships of the squadron as they and the squadron called at Ferrol, La Coruña, Villagarcía, and Vigo, where the king and queen disembarked on 28 September 1927. The squadron moved on to Algeciras, where King Alfonso XIII, arriving overland, met it and again embarked. The squadron departed Algeciras on 3 October 1927 to take the king on an inspection trip to pacified areas in Spanish Morocco, then returned to Spain at Málaga on the morning of 9 October 1927. By mid-October 1927 the Training Squadron was at Valencia.

In October 1927, King Alfonso XIII signed a royal decree reorganizing the Spanish Navy. In the new organization, Méndez Núñez′s squadron was no longer called the Training Squadron, and Alfonso XIII, Jaime I, and two new light cruisers which were about to enter service, Almirante Cervera and Príncipe Alfonso, were assigned to it. In addition, the decree created a Cruiser Division — composed of Méndez Núñez, Blas de Lezo, and Reina Victoria Eugenia — which was subordinated to the squadron.

==== 1928–1929 ====
Alfonso XIII, Jaime I, Méndez Núñez, Blas de Lezo, and Reina Victoria Eugenia departed Barcelona early on the morning of 1 March 1928 for a voyage to Almería and Málaga. The three light cruisers made a stop at Cádiz, then got back underway on 6 March and steamed north. Blas de Lezo parted company with the other two ships and moored at Lisbon, Portugal, on 7 March because one of her officers had fallen seriously ill. Méndez Núñez and Reina Victoria Eugenia arrived at Marín on 9 March, and Alfonso XIII, Jaime I, and all three light cruisers arrived at Vigo from Marín on 10 March. The five ships conducted gunnery exercises off Marín on 15, 17, and 21 March 1928. The Cruiser Division arrived at Ferrol in late March and at Vigo on 20 April 1928.

In the second week of May 1928, the three light cruisers arrived at Ferrol to have their bottoms cleaned and to undergo repairs. They departed Ferrol on 28 June 1928 headed for Gijón with Príncipe Alfonso, which received her battle ensign there. At San Sebastián on 8 July 1928, they received battle ensigns donated by the province of Gipuzkoa from Queen Victoria Eugenia, as did the Spanish Navy's new training ship, the barquentine Juan Sebastián de Elcano.

On 19 July 1928, Méndez Núñez began a voyage from Ferrol to La Coruña. From there she proceeded to Bilbao with the captain general of the Department of Ferrol aboard, arriving on 24 July. Early on the morning of 27 July, she got back underway and, after a stop at Pasajes on 28 July, proceeded to Santander, where she attended King Alfonso XIII and Queen Victoria Eugenie. She then docked at Musel on 31 July and at Gijón on 2 August before returning to Ferrol.

In mid-August 1928, all three cruisers of the Cruiser Division departed Ferrol to join the squadron. They arrived at Marín on 18 August and conducted gunnery and amphibious landing exercises there. On 21 August Alfonso XIII, Jaime I, the seaplane tender Dédalo, the three light cruisers, and the torpedo boats T-2, T-7, T-9, and T-10 left Marín to refuel at Vigo.

Méndez Núñez and Blas de Lezo anchored at Almería on 29 September 1928 to take on fuel oil. They then spent October and early November 1928 in joint fleet maneuvers as part of a squadron that also included Alfonso XIII, Jaime I, another light cruiser, four destroyers, nine submarines, six torpedo boats, and other smaller vessels in the waters of the Balearic Islands and off the Levante coast of Spain, during which Méndez Núñez called at Palma de Mallorca on Mallorca in the Balearics in late October. After completing the maneuvers, the squadron departed Pollensa and arrived at Barcelona on 10 and 11 November 1928. The squadron began to departing Barcelona on 20 November, and in late November 1928 Alfonso XIII, Jaime I, Méndez Núñez, Almirante Cervera, Blas de Lezo, and Príncipe Alfonso arrived at Ferrol.

Méndez Núñez and Blas de Lezo entered dry dock at Ferrol in late February 1929. On the morning of 13 March 1929, they got underway from Vigo in company with Príncipe Alfonso for open-ocean maneuvers with other ships of the squadron that often lasted for more than a week. On the morning of 5 April 1929 the three light cruisers returned to Vigo. They then called at Cádiz from 9 to 17 April 1929. In company with Alfonso XIII, Jaime I, and the destroyer division, the three light cruisers arrived at Seville on 9 May 1929 to take part in the opening that day of the Ibero-American Exposition of 1929 and at Barcelona on 17 May 1929 for the opening that day of the 1929 Barcelona International Exposition. The ships remained at Barcelona to attend the visit of King Alfonso XIII. Foreign warships also arrived at Barcelona for the exposition, and the personnel of the ships took part in various banquets, parades, visits, and other events. The Spanish fleet departed Barcelona on 1 June 1929.

The two battleships and three light cruisers anchored at Alcudia on 17 June and later called at Palma de Mallorca. They arrived at Valencia in early July 1929 and, joined by Almirante Cervera, arrived at Ferrol on 9 July 1929. After refueling, the four light cruisers left Ferrol on 13 July bound for Santander. After the fleet had assembled at Santander, King Alfonso XIII and Infante Juan, Count of Barcelona, on 20 August 1929 boarded Príncipe Alfonso, which served as flagship, and the ships put to sea for maneuvers. On the afternoon of 30 August 1929, Méndez Núñez departed Santander for training.

In the second week of September 1929, Méndez Núñez and Blas de Lezo left Ferrol to join the squadron at Cartagena. The squadron got underway from Cartagena on the morning of 17 September 1929 for maneuvers in the Mediterranean. Part of the squadron put in at Barcelona in October 1929 for crew rest, refueling, and repairs, and a naval review took place before King Alfonso XIII on 15 October. After the maneuvers concluded, Méndez Núñez returned to Ferrol on 25 October 1929 in company with Alfonso XIII, Jaime I, Blas de Lezo, Alsedo, Lazaga, Velasco, and the destroyer Sánchez Barcáiztegui. In December 1929, Méndez Núñez, Almirante Cervera, and Blas de Lezo assembled at Cartagena.

==== 1930–1931 ====
Méndez Núñez departed Cartagena on 27 February 1930 and proceeded to the Arsenal de la Carraca at San Fernando, which she reached the same day. At the arsenal, twelve 533-millimetre (21 in) torpedo tubes were installed aboard her in four triple mounts. In March 1930 she joined the Alfonso XIII, Jaime I, Almirante Cervera, Blas de Lezo, Principe Alfonso, the light cruiser Miguel de Cervantes, and a destroyer squadron at Marín. The ships conducted exercises for the next two months, then arrived at Ferrol.

On the morning of 26 April 1930, Méndez Núñez, Almirante Cervera, and Blas de Lezo got underway from Vigo bound for Tenerife in the Canary Islands, which they reached on the morning of 29 April. At Tenerife, they attended festivities commemorating the 15th-century conquest of the Canary Islands by the Crown of Castile. They then called at Las Palmas, which they reached on 6 May. The three cruisers carried out maneuvers before departing Las Palmas on 12 May bound for Vigo except for Blas de Lezo, which arrived at Cádiz the same day.

In the first half of June 1930. the Spanish squadron carried out exercises in the Ferrol estuary. After their completion, four light cruisers, including Méndez Núñez, and six destroyers returned to Ferrol. On 18 July 1930, the cruisers Méndez Núñez, Almirante Cervera, and Blas de Lezo departed Ferrol for Santander, where King Alfonso XIII visited them on 21 July 1930.

On 30 August 1930 the Spanish fleet concentrated at Ferrol, bringing together Alfonso XIII, Jamie I, Dédalo (with six seaplanes aboard), Méndez Núñez, Blas de Lezo, Reina Victoria Eugenia, all three Almirante Cervera-class light cruisers, the destroyers Almirante Ferrándiz, Alsedo, José Luis Díez, Lazaga, and Sánchez Barcáiztegui, and submarines. The ships and aircraft conducted maneuvers in the Cantabrian Sea between Cape Ortegal and the Spanish border with France. The maneuvers ended on 20 September 1930 with a parade before King Alfonso XIII. The Spanish fleet arrived at Cádiz on 27 September 1930, then conducted a cruise through the Mediterranean that lasted until December 1930. At the beginning of 1931 Méndez Núñez began repairs and modifications at the Arsenal de La Carraca in San Fernando.

=== Second Spanish Republic ===
==== 1931–1932 ====
On 14 April 1931, King Alfonso XIII was deposed and the Second Spanish Republic was proclaimed. Under the new republic, fuel restrictions significantly reduced Méndez Núñez′s activities. However, on 27 May 1931 Méndez Núñez, the battleships España (ex-Alfonso XIII) and Jaime I, the light cruisers Almirante Cervera, Miguel de Cervantes, and República (the former Reina Victoria Eugenia), the destroyers Almirante Ferrándiz, Lazaga, Lepanto, Sánchez Barcáiztegui, and Velasco, the seaplane tender Dédalo, and a submarine division arrived at Ferrol, where a naval review took place in the presence of Minister of the Navy Santiago Casares Quiroga, the Captain General of the Department of Ferrol, and the squadron commander.

Méndez Núñez left Vigo on 6 July 1931 bound for Marín, where she rendezvoused with Almirante Cervera and Miguel de Cervantes and the submarines B-1, B-2, and B-4. After conducting open-ocean exercises, they all made port at Ferrol on 10 July 1931. In the first week of August 1931, Méndez Núñez, Almirante Cervera, Blas de Lezo, Libertad (ex-Principe Alfonso), Miguel de Cervantes, and República, eight destroyers, and ten submarines arrived at Bilbao. On the morning of 3 November 1931, Méndez Núñez left Ferrol and headed for Cádiz, where she remained until late December 1931 and received a visit from Minister of the Navy José Giral Pereira.

On 9 May 1932 the six light cruisers moved from Ferrol to La Coruña for an official visit. Leaving Almirante Cervera and Libertad behind at La Coruña, Méndez Núñez, Blas de Lezo, Miguel de Cervantes, and República got back underway on 14 May and continued to Vigo. On 25 May 1932, the ships arrived at Marín for gunnery exercises at the firing range there.

In July 1932, Méndez Núñez participated in maneuvers along the coast of Galicia. On 11 July, she took part in the last tactical exercise of the first phase of the maneuvers, in which she, Blas de Lezo, Lepanto, and Sánchez Barcáiztegui, designated the "Blue" force, were charged with attacking the Galician coast while the "Red" force, composed of the other ships involved in the exercise, attempted to defend it. To approach without being detected by the "Red" force off Cape Nave, the "Blue" force commander decided to steam his ships through the Centollo Pass, a 365-metre (400 yd) wide channel off Cape Finisterre between the Spanish coast and the Centollo Shoal, which lies about 700 metres (770 yd) offshore. The channel is 8 metres (26 ft) deep at low tide and was considered safe for ships with the draft of the light cruisers and destroyers because ships with a deeper draft, such as the armored cruiser Emperador Carlos V, had navigated it safely over the years.

On 11 July 1932, the "Blue" force began its approach and entered the channel in line ahead, with Sánchez Barcáiztegui in the lead, followed in order by Lepanto, Blas de Lezo, and finally Méndez Núñez, with the other three ships ordered to follow Sánchez Barcáiztegui. The two destroyers passed through the channel safely, but at 14:45 Blas de Lezo struck an uncharted rock which tore a large gash in her hull, to the astonishment of everyone aboard. She signaled a warning of the danger to Méndez Núñez, which altered course closer to the Centollo Shoal and avoided the rock.

When Blas de Lezo signaled that she had suffered damage, but without reporting its severity, the commander of the "Blue" force ordered all the ships close with her and render assistance. First Sánchez Barcáiztegui towed her briefly until the tow cable broke. Méndez Núñez then attempted a tow, but lacked the appropriate lines for it. Lepanto next tried to tow Blas de Lezo, but the destroyer Alcalá Galiana, which on her own initiative had arrived from the "Red" force, inadvertently interfered with Lepanto while making an uncoordinated attempt of her own to assist Blas de Lezo. The Spanish ships then awaited the eventual arrival of the Spanish tug Argos, which managed to begin a tow, but it soon became apparent that Blas de Leo could not reach safety, and the other ships on the scene took off all 346 members of her crew without loss of life. Blas de Lezo sank five to six hours after striking the rock and about 5 kilometres (2.7 nmi; 3.1 mi) from the point of impact. After Almirante Cervera, Méndez Núñez, and Miguel de Cervantes arrived at Ferrol on 18 July, Méndez Núñez entered dry dock for an inspection of her hull to see if she had suffered any damage in the incident.

==== 1933–1936 ====
Méndez Núñez visited the Balearic Islands in June 1933, calling at Palma de Mallorca from 12 to 13 June before moving on to Mahón on Menorca. In July 1933, she took part in maneuvers in the Mediterranean Sea with Almirante Cervera, Libertad, Miguel de Cervantes, ten destroyers, Dédalo with three Dornier and three Savoia seaplanes embarked, the patrol boat Tetuán, two torpedo boats, seven submarines, a tanker, and a tug. On 18 July 1933, while Méndez Núñez was in the Bay of Cádiz, the fuel oil in one of her boilers ignited, causing the boiler to explode, killing one man and injuring four others. In early January 1934 she was awaiting repairs at Cádiz, and in June 1934 she was under repair at the Arsenal de La Carraca in San Fernando.

At the beginning of 1935 Méndez Núñez left the Cruiser Division and replaced República as flagship of the destroyer flotillas. On 15 February, she and República arrived at Valencia.

On 29 May 1935, Méndez Núñez began maneuvers with her squadron in the Mediterranean. At the beginning of June she was at Málaga, from which she departed on 2 June in company with Jaime I, República, Lepanto, Sánchez Barcáiztegui, and the destroyer Alcalá Galiano. The maneuvers concluded on 9 June, and on 11 June 1935, she left Mahón bound for Palma de Mallorca, transporting generals and 18 colonels from the promotion aptitude course. She arrived at Pollensa on 12 June, and the remaining ships of the squadron carried out maneuvers in the Balearic Islands. In the first week of September 1935, the Cruiser Division was at Ceuta on the coast of North Africa. Méndez Núñez departed on the afternoon of 9 September, followed on 10 September by Almirante Cervera, Libertad, and Miguel de Cervantes. At 18:00 on 10 October 1935, the fleet left Algeciras for the Mediterranean.

In April 1936, Méndez Núñez was at the Arsenal de La Carraca having her bottom cleaned. In early May 1936, her squadron conducted maneuvers in the Canary Islands. On 5 May Jaime I arrived at Santa Cruz de Tenerife and Méndez Núñez and the four destroyers of the 2nd Flotilla arrived at Tenerife, followed on 7 May by a flotilla of submarines and several more light cruisers and destroyers. The maneuvers concluded on 13 May, and Méndez Núñez headed to Ceuta to refuel. After refueling, she departed for the Gulf of Guinea, stopping at Las Palmas in the Canary Islands and Lagos in Nigeria before arriving at Santa Isabel on the north coast of Fernando Po on 25 June 1936.

=== Spanish Civil War ===
Méndez Núñez was in the Gulf of Guinea when the Spanish Civil War broke out on 17 July 1936. Her commanding officer received orders to return to Spain, and she departed on 23 July. She arrived at Dakar in Senegal on 5 August to refuel and received new orders instructing her to return to Spanish Guinea. Getting back underway on 7 August, she arrived at Spanish Guinea on 14 August. There her crew, which sympathized with the Republican faction, took control of her and put her commanding officer and most of her other officers ashore. She again got underway for Spain on 30 August. When she arrived at Dakar on 9 September, her last two officers deserted. She arrived at Málaga on the morning of 21 September and at Cartagena on 23 September 1936. She entered the Arsenal de Cartagena for repairs.

When Méndez Núñez arrived in Spain, she hastily was placed in service with the Spanish Republican Navy. Most Spanish Navy officers had gone over to the Nationalist side, leaving the Republican fleet with few officers, so she was placed under the command of a lieutenant. When the war broke out, the Republican fleet was in the Cantabrian Sea off northern Spain, so Méndez Núñez deployed to the Strait of Gibraltar with three destroyers in mid-October 1936 to cover the Republican fleet's transit of the strait, where the Nationalist heavy cruiser Canarias and light cruiser Almirante Cervera were operating. The Republican fleet passed through the strait successfully, and all the Republican ships arrived at Cartagena together on 17 October 1936.

Méndez Núñez sortied several times from Cartagena to protect Republican shipping in the Mediterranean. She deployed to Barcelona on 8 December 1936 with Sánchez Barcáiztegui and the destroyer Gravina to protect the port from Nationalist attacks. She returned to Cartagena on 28 December 1936.

In early 1937, Méndez Núñez made several sorties, sometimes alone and sometimes with other Republican cruisers and destroyers, in search of the Nationalist cruisers. On 23 April 1937, she got underway from Cartagena with Jaime I, Libertad, and several destroyers to bombard Málaga and Motril. Jaime I ran aground off Almería, and the ships returned to Cartagena on 25 April 1937.

On 6 September 1937, Méndez Núñez departed Cartagena with Libertad and seven destroyers to protect a convoy of four merchant ships. The warships rendezvoused with the convoy off Algiers at 05:00 on 7 September. At 10:00, they sighted the Nationalist heavy cruiser Baleares about 30 nautical miles (56 km; 35 mi) west of Algiers off Cape Cherchell. While the destroyers and merchant ships moved away, Méndez Núñez and Libertad closed with Baleares and the Battle of Cape Cherchell began at about 10:45 when the cruisers opened fire on one another. After firing a few rounds, Méndez Núñez fell behind because she was unable to make more than about 26 knots (48 km/h; 30 mph). Baleares and Libertad continued to fire at each other until losing contact. Méndez Núñez rejoined the battle when the two Republican cruisers again sighted Baleares at around 17:30 and began to exchange fire with her, but contact finally was broken for good at about 17:45.

In the ensuing months, the Republican fleet made a number of short sorties. On 5 March 1938 the most significant of these began when Méndez Núñez, Libertad, and five destroyers set out to bombard Palma de Mallorca. Shortly after they got underway, they received orders to instead intercept the Nationalist light cruiser Almirante Cervera, which reportedly was steaming toward Cádiz. At midnight on 5–6 March, the Republican ships encountered Almirante Cervera, Baleares, and Canarias east of Cape Palos as the three Nationalist cruisers provided distant cover for two merchant ships approaching from Italy. During the ensuing Battle of Cape Palos, Libertad hit the leading ship of the Nationalist column, Baleares, with gunfire and Baleares was sunk by torpedoes, probably launched by the destroyer Lepanto. Méndez Núñez did not exchange fire with the Nationalist ships during the engagement, but she received the Madrid Distinction (Distintivo de Madrid) along with the other Republican ships involved in the action.

Of limited military value, Méndez Núñez was relegated to making only occasional short sorties from Cartagena and otherwise remaining in port there. She sustained damage during an air attack on Cartagena on 29 December 1938. Like most of the Republican fleet, she left Cartagena on 5 March 1939 as the Republican government collapsed, bound for Bizerte in French Tunisia, where she arrived and took refuge on 7 March. After negotiations with the French government, the Republican fleet at Bizerte — Méndez Núñez, Libertad, Miguel de Cervantes, eight destroyers, and a submarine — surrendered to the victorious Nationalists. On 27 March 1939, the Nationalist destroyer Císcar arrived at Bizerte with Admiral Salvador Moreno Fernández aboard to take charge of the formerly Republican cruisers. Two Nationalist transports arrived on 31 March 1939 with new crews for them. The war ended on 1 April 1939, and the ships arrived at Cádiz on 8 April. The former Republican and Nationalist ships were incorporated into the reunified Spanish Navy in the service of Francoist Spain.

=== Francoist Spain ===
==== 1939–1952 ====
Méndez Núñez as an anti-aircraft cruiser in 1950.

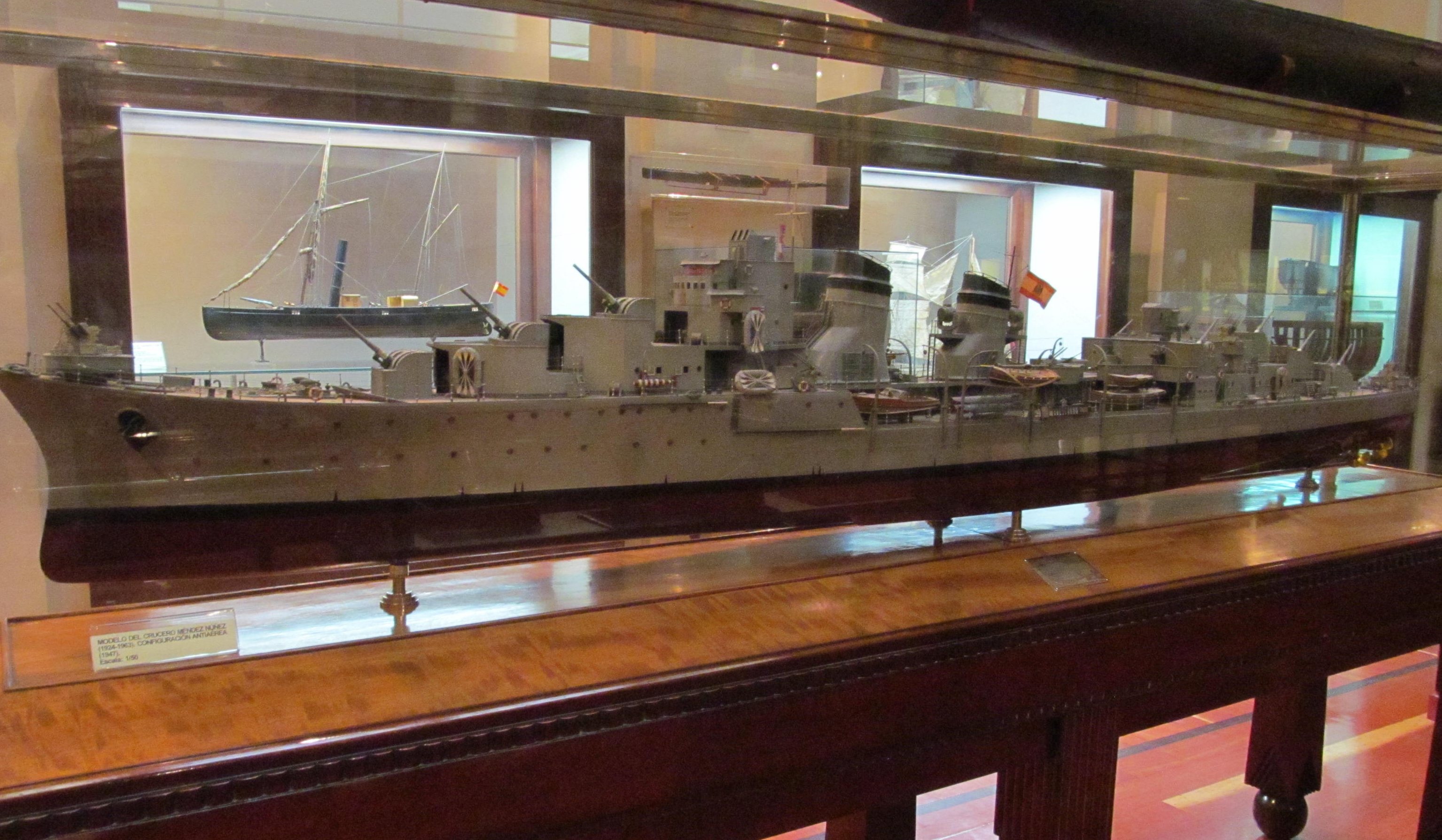
Model of Méndez Núñez as an anti-aircraft cruiser.

In the summer of 1939, Méndez Núñez arrived at Ferrol, where her six 152-millimetre (6 in) guns were removed and transferred to the Spanish Army for use in coastal artillery batteries. The Junta Modernizadora de Cruceros (Cruiser Modernization Board) decided to convert her into an anti-aircraft cruiser. The conversion began at Ferrol in June 1943 and was completed in 1947. She emerged from the conversion with her three funnels reduced to two more streamlined ones, her bridge raised, and her bow lengthened. As reconstructed, her full-load displacement became 6,312 tons, her length 142.3 metres (466 ft 10 in), her beam 13.86 metres (45 ft 6 in), and her draft 5.4 metres (17 ft 9 in). Her powerplant and maximum speed remained unchanged, but her range became 5,300 nautical miles (9,800 km; 6,100 mi) at 10 knots (19 km/h; 12 mph). Delivered to the Spanish Navy on 29 March 1947 without her armament, she proceeded to the Arsenal de La Carraca at San Fernando to have her new armament installed. It consisted of eight 120-millimetre (4.7 in) guns in single mounts, ten 37-millimetre (1.5 in) guns in five double mounts, four quadruple 20-millimetre (0.8 in) guns, six 533-millimetre (21 in) torpedo tubes in two triple mounts (reduced from her previous twelve tubes in four triple mounts), four anti-submarine mortars, and a depth charge rack with a capacity of six depth charges.

On the morning of 4 June 1948, the Spanish Navy established a new Mediterranean Naval Division based at Cartagena. It consisted of Méndez Núñez, which served as its flagship, and the destroyers Alcalá Galiano, Escaño, Gravina, and Ulloa. The division arrived at Castellón de la Plana on 16 March 1949 and remained there for 24 hours before getting back underway on 17 March and arriving at Valencia the same day. On 24 May 1949, Minister of the Navy Francisco Regalado visited Méndez Núñez at Cartagena. Méndez Núñez remained at Barcelona throughout the visit there of Caudillo Francisco Franco in June 1949.

Following exercises, the Mediterranean Naval Division — now consisting of Méndez Núñez (its flagship), Alcalá Galiano, Gravina, Lepanto, and the destroyer Churruca — arrived at Cartagena on 12 July 1949. On 7 November 1949, the division anchored at Palma de Mallorca. Arriving from Cartagena, the Atlantic Squadron — under the command of Salvador Moreno Fernández and made up of Almirante Cervera, Miguel de Cervantes, the light cruiser Galicia (ex-Libertad, ex-Principe Alfonso), and six destroyers — rendezvoused with the Mediterranean Naval Division at Palma de Mallorca on 12 November 1949. The combined force came under Moreno's command. The Mediterranean Naval Division called at Barcelona from 10 to 14 November 1949 to rest its crews after maneuvers.

Méndez Núñez arrived at Palma de Mallorca on 27 June 1950 with now-Minister of the Navy Francisco Regalado, the chief of staff of the Spanish Navy, and the commander of the Mediterranean Squadron aboard. On 30 June, the men visited the base at Mahón aboard Méndez Núñez. In October 1950 Méndez Núñez took part in maneuvers the squadron conducted between Cádiz and the Canary Islands, participating as a ship of the "Red" force along with five destroyers, two gunboats, a minelayer, a minesweeper, several submarines, and auxiliary ships. After the conclusion of the maneuvers, the "Red" force ships arrived at Cádiz on 17 October, and the squadron's ships left Cádiz on 6 November 1950 to return to their various bases. The Mediterranean Naval Division, made up of Méndez Núñez and four destroyers, arrived at Almería on 8 November 1950.

The Mediterranean Division, consisting of Méndez Núñez and three destroyers, got underway from Cartagena on 7 March 1951 for maneuvers. The division called at Barcelona from mid-March to 21 March, then, in company with a minesweeper, returned to Cartagena, which they reached on 23 March. The division, now composed of Méndez Núñez and four destroyers, conducted an instructional cruise in the Balearic Islands and along the coasts of Levante and Catalonia, visiting Palma de Mallorca, Alcudia, and Roses before docking at Barcelona at 19:00 on 14 June 1951, then got back underway on 18 June and made stops at Tarragona, Valencia, and Alicante before returning to Cartagena.

The Mediterranean Naval Division, made up of Méndez Núñez and the three destroyers of the 2nd Flotilla, departed Cartagena on 6 October 1951 bound for Cádiz, where it attended the coronation festivities for Our Lady of Mount Carmel. At 11:00 on 25 October 1951, the three destroyers made port at Ceuta, where Méndez Núñez arrived at 12:00. The Mediterranean Division left Ceuta early on the morning of 29 October 1951 and arrived at Málaga late in the afternoon of the same day.

In early January 1952, Méndez Núñez moved from Cartagena to Barcelona, which she reached on 8 January. While there, she received five United States Navy warships — two cruisers and three destroyers — of the United States Sixth Fleet which began a visit to Barcelona on 9 January.

In April 1952, Spanish naval forces underwent a reorganization in which Méndez Núñez′s base changed from Cartagena to Ferrol. She arrived at Ferrol in company with two destroyers. On 10 May 1952, she made port in company with Ulloa at Cádiz, rendezvousing with the heavy cruiser Canarias, flagship of the fleet commander, Vicealmirante (Vice Admiral) Francisco Regalado, which had arrived there the previous day. On 16 September 1952, Méndez Núñez′s squadron — which also included Canarias, Almirante Cervera, the seven destroyers of the 1st Flotilla, and a minelayer — got underway from Ferrol for maneuvers off the coast of Galicia. It returned to Ferrol on 15 October 1952 at the conclusion of the maneuvers.

==== 1953–1957 ====
In mid-May 1953 Méndez Núñez, serving as flagship of the 2nd Fleet, began a month of maneuvers with the fleet in the Rías Baixas. Upon their completion, the ships departed La Coruña bound for Ferrol, where they arrived on 11 June 1953. On the afternoon of 14 October 1953, the fleet departed Cádiz and proceeded to the waters off Cape St. Vincent on the coast of Portugal, with Francisco Franco, several government ministers, and the chief of staff of the navy embarked aboard Canarias. A naval review took place off Cape St. Vincent, with the dignitaries aboard Canarias observing Méndez Núñez, three other cruisers, 17 destroyers, five gunboats, four minelayers, a torpedo boat, eight minesweepers, five submarines, and auxiliary ships as they passed Canarias.

On 1 June 1954, the 1st Fleet Division, consisting of Méndez Núñez, Almirante Cervera, and three destroyers, departed Ferrol for gunnery exercises. On 3 December 1954, the fleet departed Ferrol for La Coruña. It returned to Ferrol on the afternoon of 4 December and later proceeded to Santander.

In early February 1955, the division — composed of Canarias, Méndez Núñez, and three destroyers — left Ferrol bound for Cartagena. During the voyage, a steam pipe burst aboard Méndez Núñez, killing three stokers and seriously injuring a stoker and a mechanic. The division returned to port the same day. Méndez Núñez entered the shipyard for repairs, but the rest of the ships soon got back underway to resume their voyage and conduct a training cruise in the Mediterranean. The injured stoker died a few days later.

In September 1955 Méndez Núñez began joint maneuvers in the Mediterranean with the fleet, which also included Canarias (the flagship), Almirante Cervera, and six destroyers. The ships departed Ferrol on 20 September and concentrated at Santa Pola. After calling at Barcelona from 4 to 9 October 1955, the ships resumed the exercises. Upon their conclusion, the ships anchored in Palma de Mallorca in late October and subsequently each ship proceeded to its base. By December 1955, Méndez Núñez was back at Ferrol.

In May 1957 Méndez Núñez got underway from Cádiz with the commander-in-chief of the fleet, Vicealmirante (Vice Admiral) Pedro Nieto Antúnez, the Director of the General Naval School, and 15 students from the school aboard and proceeded to Cartagena, where the students would prepare for upcoming general maneuvers in the Mediterranean. She reached Caratagena on 24 May. The three divisions of the fleet began maneuvers in the autumn of 1957 in the waters off their respective bases, then all moved to the Mediterranean and conducted joint maneuvers. In the first phase of these, in October 1957, a part of the fleet attempted to "bombard" a base in the Bay of Cádiz, while another group of ships "defended" the base. In the second phase, the ships assembled at Cartagena, and part of the squadron attempted to "capture" Santa Pola while other ships "defended" against the attack. During this phase, the exercise was interrupted when Canarias, Almirante Cervera, Miguel de Cervantes and two destroyers broke away to provide assistance to victims of flooding in Valencia. After completing this mission, they met the rest of the squadron at Alicante for a rest stop. From 25 to 27 October 1957, Canarias, Méndez Núñez (serving as flagship of her division), Almirante Cervera, Miguel de Cervantes, nine destroyers, four minesweepers, and two tugs. The fleet again concentrated at Palma de Mallorca on 3 November 1957.

==== Ifni War ====
Amid increasing tensions with Morocco over the status of Spanish West Africa, the fleet received orders in early November 1957 while at Palma de Mallorca to transport Spanish Army troops to Spanish West Africa and support the army and patrol the coast there. The naval force was divided into two groups, with Canarias, Méndez Núñez, and three destroyers assigned to Group "A" and Almirante Cervera, Miguel de Cervantes, and four destroyers to Group "B". Group "A" arrived at Ceuta on 4 November 1957 and embarked a tercio of the Spanish Legion and its vehicles and supplies. Canarias departed on 6 November and Méndez Núñez on 7 November, and the ships subsequently disembarked the troops and materiel at the Port of Las Palmas in the Canary Islands. The fleet's 3rd Division, consisting of Méndez Núñez and three destroyers, patrolled the coast of Africa between Ifni and Villa Cisneros between 9 and 15 November 1957 to show the flag and prevent the smuggling of weapons to the indigenous Moroccan Army of Liberation. On 16 November, the ships arrived at the Port of Las Palmas, where the entire Spanish fleet concentrated before moving subsequently to Santa Cruz de Tenerife.

The Ifni War broke out on 23 November 1957, when 1,500 Moroccan Army of Liberation troops invaded Ifni. The Spanish fleet got underway from the Canary Islands on 25 November to embark more troops at Cádiz. Embarkation began on 27 November, when the 201st Paratrooper Company began to board Canarias, Méndez Núñez, and Miguel de Cervantes. After bringing the paratroopers and their ammunition aboard, the ships departed Cádiz independently to proceed to the Canary Islands. On the night of 28 November, however, they received orders to instead head directly to Ifni to discharge the troops at Sidi Ifni. Canarias arrived there on the morning of 29 November, Méndez Núñez that same afternoon, and Miguel de Cervantes on the morning of 30 November. After another visit to the Canary Islands, Méndez Núñez departed Las Palmas on 3 December 1957 as the flagship of Contralmirante (Counter Admiral) Meléndez and arrived on 4 December 1957 at Sidi Ifni, where Meléndez met with the Governor of Ifni, Mariano Gómez-Zamalloa y Quirce, and agreed to provide bombardment and logistical support to Spanish forces ashore.

On 6 December 1957, the Spanish fleet received orders to concentrate off Agadir to deter Morocco from intervening in the conflict directly. In line ahead with Canarias leading and followed in order by Méndez Núñez and five destroyers, the ships began their first pass off Agadir at 11:00 on 7 December, heading north at 8 knots (15 km/h; 9.2 mph) with their guns trained to starboard at the Moroccan coast. They reversed course and began a second run at 12:30, this time heading south with their guns trained to port at the coast. Shortly after 17:00, the ships separated, with Méndez Núñez returning to Sidi Ifni in company with the destroyer Gravina. The demonstration had the deterrent effect the Spanish hoped for, as King Mohammed V of Morocco subsequently rescinded his policy of supporting the rebels in Ifni.

On 9 December 1957, Méndez Núñez bombarded enemy positions at Telata, Mesti, and Si Uarsig. On 10 December she received news that the rebels were massing to attack Sidi Ifni, and she bombarded those forces on 10 and 11 December. On 15 December 1957 she withdrew in company with the destroyer Churruca to the Canary Islands, where she remained until February 1958. The Ifni War concluded on 30 June 1958.

==== 1958–1963 ====
Returning to Spain, Méndez Núñez arrived at Pasajes on 19 August 1958 and at Santander on 28 August. Minister of the Navy Felipe José Abárzuza visited her during her stay at Santander. She arrived at Barcelona from Mahón on the morning of 25 November 1958 to place herself under the orders of Abárzuza, who arrived in the city on 30 November. She then transported Abárzuza to Mahón, arriving there on 3 December, and to Palma de Mallorca, which she reached on 4 December.

On 1 February 1959, Méndez Núñez arrived at Ceuta with Minister of Public Works Jorge Vigón aboard. After the visit, she steamed to Algeciras, arriving there on 2 February 1959.

At the beginning of 1960, Méndez Núñez became a support vessel for the 2nd Minesweeper Flotilla at Palma de Mallorca. In 1962, she became the flagship of the Mediterranean Naval Group, based at Cartagena. From March 1963, she served at Cartagena as an accommodation ship for the headquarters of the Mediterranean Naval Division.

== Final disposition ==
Méndez Núñez was decommissioned in December 1963. She was sold in January 1964 and scrapped shortly thereafter.

== Honors and awards ==
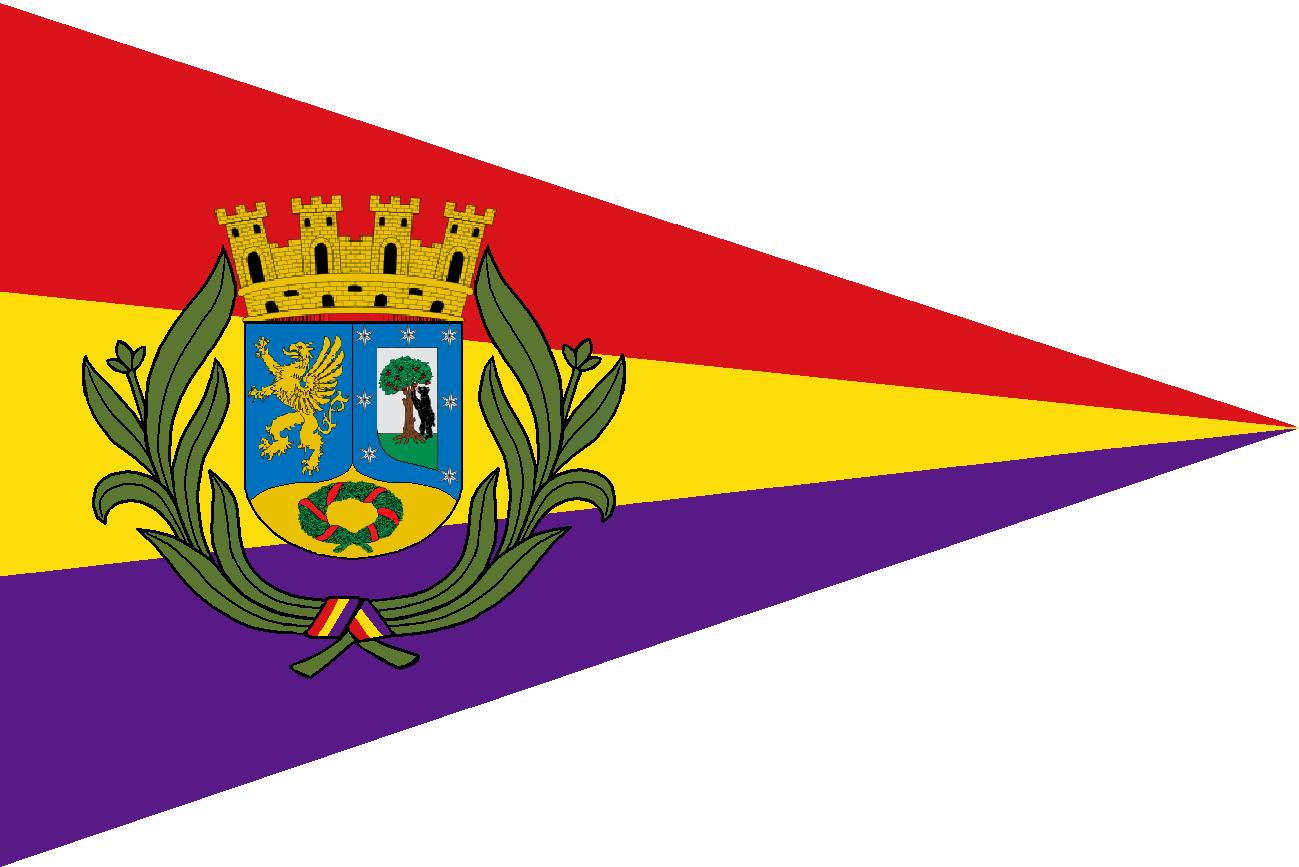
- Madrid Distinction (Second Spanish Republic, 1938)
