= Battle of Cape Cherchell =

Naval battle in the Spanish Civil War

Coordinates: 36°54′25″N 2°12′12″E

- Part of the Spanish Civil War
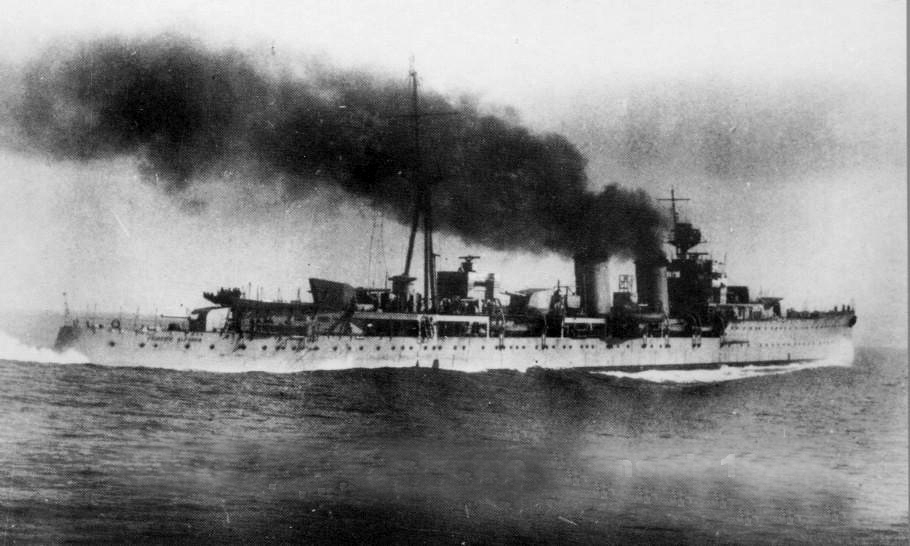
- The Republican light cruiser Libertad on sea trials in 1927.
Date	7 September 1937
Location	Mediterranean Sea near Cherchell, French Algeria
Result	Nationalist victory: Republican shipping disrupted in the Mediterranean Sea

Belligerents
Spanish Republic	Nationalist Spain

Commanders and leaders
Miguel Buiza Fernández-Palacios	Manuel Vierna Belando

Strength
2 light cruisers 7 destroyers 2 cargo ships	1 heavy cruiser

Casualties and losses
2 cargo ships	1 heavy cruiser seriously damaged

The Battle of Cape Cherchell was a naval battle between the Nationalist heavy cruiser Baleares and the Spanish Republican Navy light cruisers Libertad and Méndez Núñez during the Spanish Civil War on 7 September 1937. The cruiser action occurred in the Mediterranean Sea north of the city of Cherchell in French Algeria.

Baleares was patrolling the Mediterranean and engaged Libertad and Méndez Núñez, which were protecting two merchant ships. Baleares was heavily damaged in two exchanges of fire with Libertad and did little damage to the Republican ships, but forced the merchant ships to head to the Algerian coast where one wrecked and one was interned by French authorities. Miguel Buiza Fernández-Palacios was dismissed as commander of the Republican Navy as a result of the battle.

== Battle ==
In the morning of 7 September 1937, Baleares unexpectedly met a convoy of Spanish Republican Navy ships while patrolling in the Mediterranean Sea along the coast of French Algeria, about 30 nautical miles (56 km; 35 mi) north of the city of Cherchell. Republican Navy commander Miguel Buiza Fernández-Palacios had sent nine ships (two light cruisers and seven destroyers) from Cartagena to protect two merchant ships returning with supplies from the Soviet Union. Baleares was vulnerable as she was caught between the convoy and the coast. Captain Manuel Vierna Belando ordered a change of course to the northeast towards the rear of the convoy. The Republican merchant ships reacted by heading south to Algeria. The four destroyers quickly broke off the engagement and continued to escort the merchant ships, probably due to a lack of training and confidence in their ability to launch a torpedo attack against Baleares. While these ships steamed ahead, the light cruisers Libertad and Méndez Núñez positioned themselves to engage Baleares, which opened fire on them but did only minor damage; technical failures made the shooting of the Nationalist cruiser less accurate. Vierna Belando blames adverse winds and the smoke generated by two starting boilers that obscured the stern guns' fire control director. Libertad fired a salvo that landed two direct hits on Baleares, causing a short circuit in her electronics, temporarily disabling her fore main guns and compass, desynchronizing her main fire control system, and starting a fire in her ammunition storage room. This distraction allowed the Republican ships to slip away to the south and regroup.

Though handicapped in the first encounter, Baleares renewed their pursuit. The warships met again in the afternoon off the Algerian coast. After a brief engagement, Baleares, which received once again accurate fire from Libertad and whose main artillery and director were running at reduced capacity due to the previous combat damage, limped off to wait for her sister ship Canarias to arrive. The retreating Republican ships were later attacked, ineffectively, by several Nationalist warplanes, with only the destroyer Escaño being hit. Most of the planes were Italian bombers from the Aviazione Legionaria, a squadron of the Italian Regia Aeronautica (Royal Air Force) which fought in Spain under Nationalist leader Francisco Franco's orders. During the engagement the captains of the two merchant ships escorted by the Republican fleet had panicked and changed course to the south to seek shelter in Algeria. One of the merchant ships ran aground at Cherchell, while the other eventually reached Bona. Both were interned by French authorities.

== Aftermath ==
Baleares was heavily damaged during the action, three of her sailors were killed and many more were injured, while doing superficial damage to the Republican convoy. However the lone Nationalist ship, while being vastly outnumbered, had been successful in its mission to disrupt the activity of Republican merchant shipping in the Mediterranean. Buiza was removed as commander of the Republican Navy for his poor performance in the battle and replaced by Captain Luis González de Ubieta. Vierna was promoted to rear admiral, though both he and Baleares would be lost at the Battle of Cape Palos in March 1938.

== See also ==
- List of classes of Spanish Nationalist ships of the Spanish Civil War
- Aviazione Legionaria
- Spanish Civil War Republican ship classes
