= Battle of Cape Palos (1938) =

Biggest naval battle of the Spanish Civil War

Coordinates: 37°52′18″N 0°52′00″E

- Part of the Spanish Civil War
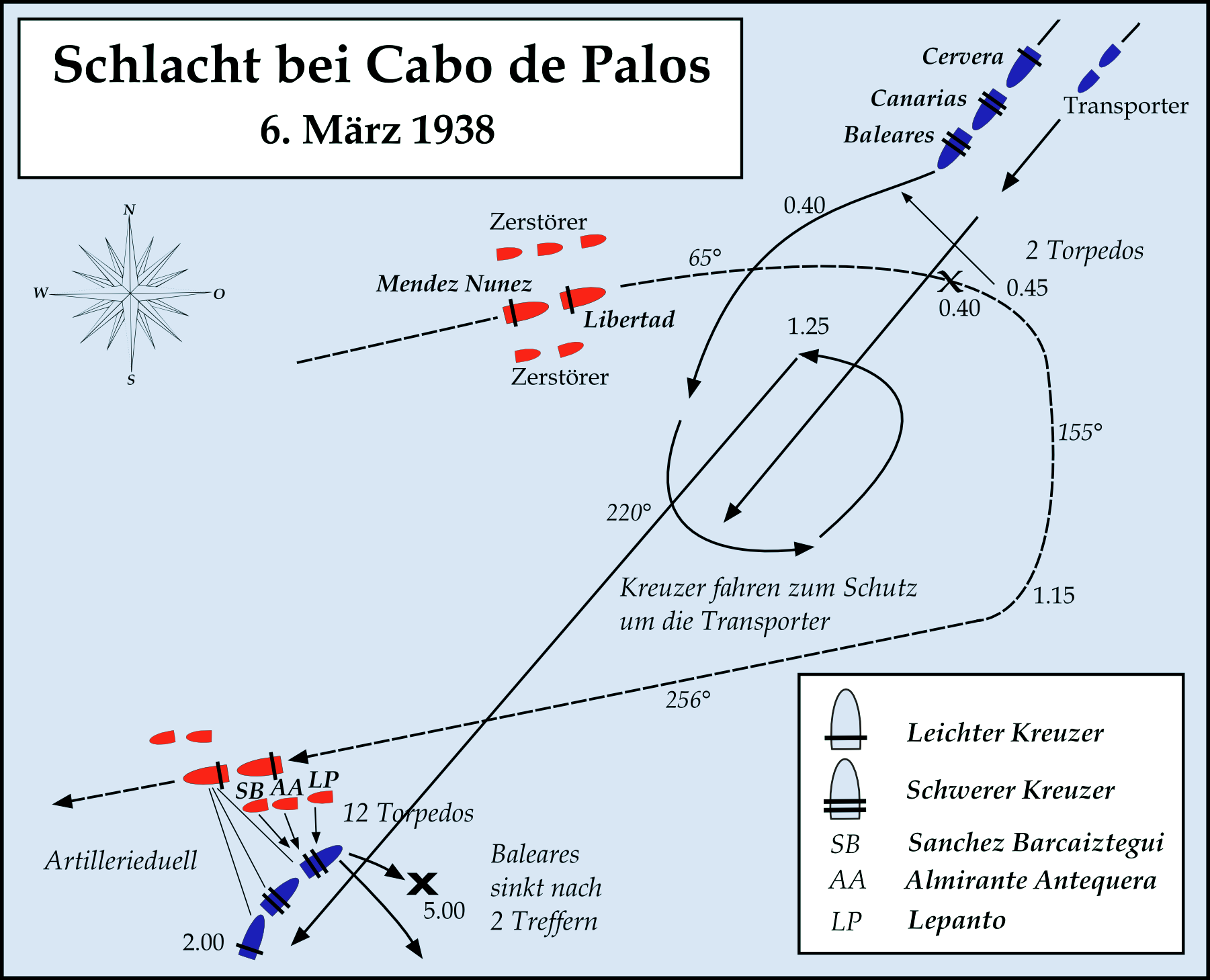
Date	March 5–6, 1938
Location	Near Cartagena, Spain, Mediterranean Sea
Result	Republican victory

Belligerents
Spanish Republic	Nationalist Spain

Commanders and leaders
Adm. Luis González de Ubieta	Adm. Manuel de Vierna y Belando †

Strength
2 light cruisers 5 destroyers	2 heavy cruisers 1 light cruiser

Casualties and losses
None	1 heavy cruiser sunk 765 dead

The Battle of Cape Palos, also known as the Second Battle of Cape Palos, was the biggest naval battle of the Spanish Civil War, fought on the night of March 5–6, 1938, east of Cape Palos near Cartagena, Spain.

== Leadup to the battle ==
On March 5, 1938 the two Nationalist heavy cruisers, Canarias and Baleares, led by Vice Admiral Manuel Vierna Belando sortied from the naval base at Palma de Mallorca, in company with the light cruiser Almirante Cervera, and three destroyers. The squadron acted as a distant escort of a convoy bearing war equipment from Italy as well as troops from the Army of Africa being ferried across the Strait of Gibraltar.

On the same day, forces of the Spanish Republican Navy, led by Admiral Luis González de Ubieta and consisting of two light cruisers (the new Libertad and the older Méndez Núñez) and five destroyers, sailed from Cartagena. At night, the Nationalist destroyers returned to base, while the cruisers remained on course.

== The battle ==
The squadrons, going in opposite directions, met by chance in the dead of night of 5–6 March 1938. A Republican destroyer fired torpedoes but missed, and both fleets passed each other by. Nationalist Rear Admiral de Vierna preferred to wait until dawn, which would enable him to use his ships' superior artillery, but Republican Vice Admiral de Ubieta decided to turn and pursue the enemy.

The sinking of Baleares photographed from attacking Republican aircraft, 6 March 1938

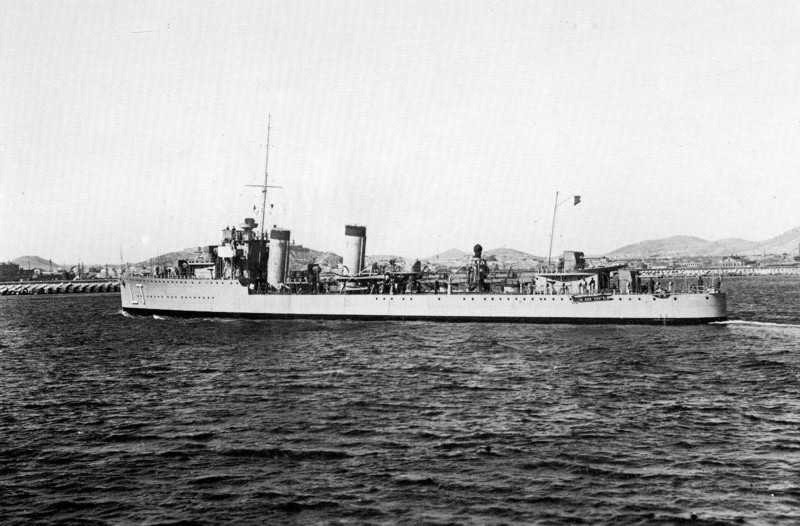
Destroyer Lepanto

The forces met again unexpectedly at about 02:15. the Nationalist cruisers opened fire on Libertad from a range of about 5,000 m (5,500 yd) and the Republican cruisers returned fire. However, one of the Nationalist ships made the mistake of firing a star shell illuminating their position to the enemy Republican ships. As the cruisers duelled, three Republican destroyers, probably unseen by the Nationalists, detached from escorting Libertad. At about 3,000 m (3,300 yd), Sánchez Barcáiztegui, Lepanto, and Almirante Antequera each fired four torpedoes. Two or three torpedoes hit Baleares between 'A' and 'B' turrets and detonated her forward magazine. The sinking is generally credited to Lepanto, but also to the destroyer Almirante Antequera by some authors.

Prioritizing the protection of the troops of the North African Army crossing the Gibraltar Strait over his own safety, Admiral de Vierna ordered his own ship, the Baleares to engage the Republican fleet while he ordered the rest of the ships away. The two surviving Nationalist cruisers quickly cleared the area, leaving Baleares to her fate. The stern remained afloat and it was from this part of the ship that survivors were rescued, thanks to the efforts of the British Royal Navy destroyers Kempenfelt and Boreas, under Captain McGrigor, who made towards the scene of the action from 40 nautical miles (74 km; 46 mi) away. Only 441 out of her crew of 1,206 were saved with Admiral Vierna among those who went down with the ship.

The Nationalist cruisers returned at dawn and survivors rescued by Boreas were transferred to them by boats. An air attack by Republican bombers interrupted the proceedings and caused one British fatality.

== Aftermath ==
The sinking of the rebel heavy cruiser Baleares was hailed as a great victory by the Republican government and Luis González de Ubieta, the commander of the Republican fleet, was awarded the Laureate Plate of Madrid (Placa Laureada de Madrid), the highest military award for gallantry of the Second Spanish Republic. The Distintivo de Madrid, which had been established by the Spanish Republic to reward courage, was given to cruisers Libertad and Méndez Núñez, and destroyers Lepanto, Almirante Antequera and Sánchez Barcáiztegui, as well as to their crew members. These ships would thenceforward fly a special pennant and the men would wear a special badge on their uniforms with the old Coat of arms of Madrid.

The Battle of Cape Palos was one of the last Republican victories of the war. Although the action was the largest naval battle of the Spanish Civil War and an important Republican victory, it had little noticeable long-term effect on the war. The Republican Navy failed to press their advantage, and the loss of Baleares was partially offset when the modernised cruiser Navarra joined the Nationalist fleet some months later.

== See also ==
- Spanish Civil War Republican ship classes
- List of classes of Spanish Nationalist ships of the Spanish Civil War

== Bibliography ==
- Hugh Thomas (historian) (2001). The Spanish Civil War. Modern Library. ISBN 0-375-75515-2.
- V. Turon (historian) (1982). The sinking of the cruiser Baleares. Warship Supplement, 68.
- ADM 116/3677. UK National Archive.
- Michael Alpert, La Guerra Civil española en el mar, Editorial Critica, ISBN 978-84-8432-975-6
