= Spanish cruiser Baleares =

Canarias-class heavy cruiser of the Spanish Navy

Coordinates: 37°52′18″N 0°52′00″E

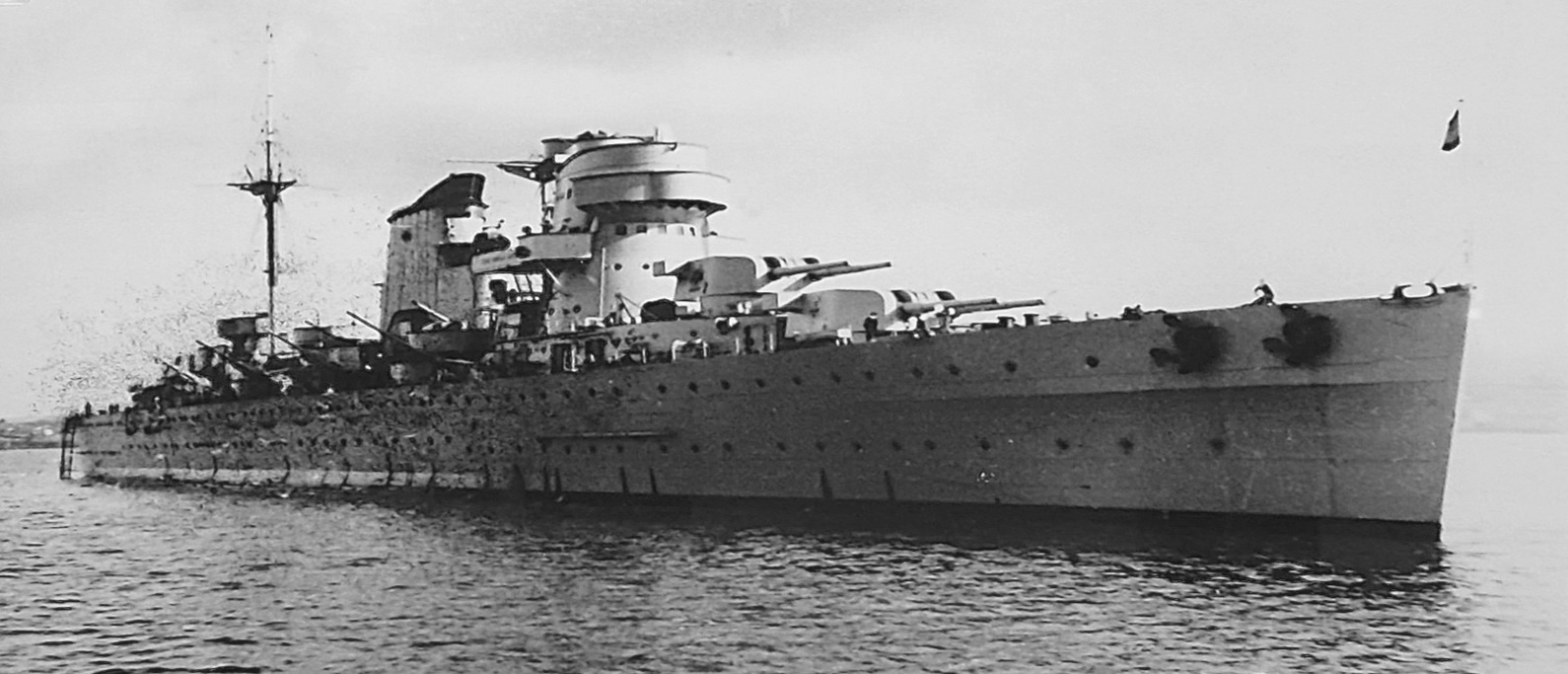
- Baleares

History

Spain
- Name: Baleares
- Namesake: Balearic Islands
- Builder: SECN, Ferrol
- Laid down: 15 August 1928
- Launched: 20 April 1932
- Commissioned: 28 December 1936
- Fate: Sunk during the Battle of Cape Palos 6 March 1938

General characteristics
- Class & type: Canarias-class heavy cruiser
- Displacement: 10,000 long tons (10,000 t) (standard); 13,283 long tons (13,496 t) (full load)
- Length: 193.9 m (636 ft 2 in)
- Beam: 19.52 m (64 ft 1 in)
- Draught: 6.51 m (21 ft 4 in)
- Installed power: 8 × Yarrow boilers; 90,000 shp (67,000 kW)
- Propulsion: 4 × Parsons geared steam turbines; 4 × shafts
- Speed: 33 kn (61 km/h; 38 mph)
- Range: 8,000 nmi (15,000 km; 9,200 mi) at 15 knots (28 km/h; 17 mph)
- Complement: 800
- Armament: 8 × 8-inch (203 mm) guns in four twin turrets; 8 × 4.7-inch (119 mm) guns; 12 × 40 mm AA guns; 3 × 20 mm AA guns; 12 × 21-inch (533 mm) torpedo tubes in triple mounts above water
- Armour: Belt 2 in (51 mm); Deck 1.5–1 in (38–25 mm); Magazine 4 in (102 mm) box around; Turret 1 in (25 mm); Conning tower 1 in (25 mm)
- Notes: Capable of carrying two aircraft catapults, which were not installed

Baleares was a Canarias-class heavy cruiser of the Spanish Navy whose control was taken by the Nationalist side during the Spanish Civil War. The two ships of the class were built upon a British design and were a modified version of the Royal Navy's County class. Baleares was constructed in Spain by the Vickers-Armstrongs subsidiary Sociedad Española de Construcción Naval, and saw service during the Spanish Civil War, when she was torpedoed and sunk by destroyers of the Spanish Republican Navy during the Battle of Cape Palos.

== History ==
In December 1936, Baleares was commissioned in an incomplete state, not mounting the fourth turret. The turret was installed by June 1937.

=== Spanish Civil War ===
In February 1937, Baleares took part, together with Canarias and Almirante Cervera, in the battle of Málaga. Baleares shelled the road from Málaga to Almería— the only escaping route from the city— in an incident that would become known as La Desbandá or Málaga–Almería road massacre. Despite all efforts made by Franco to hide what had happened, the Canadian doctor Norman Bethune managed to take photographs and wrote about this experience in The New York Times: "We counted at least 5000 kids under 10 years, thousands of them barefoot… We decided to go back and start transporting them to set them safe." Historian Paul Preston calculates that, with the rest of the units, there were more than 12,800 civil victims.

On 12 July 1937, Baleares encountered six Republican destroyers escorting two merchant vessels near Valencia. After a brief exchange of fire, the Republican ships escaped.

In the afternoon of 7 September 1937, Baleares encountered four Republican merchant ships escorted by the cruisers Libertad and Méndez Núñez and six destroyers off Algeria in what became known as the Battle of Cape Cherchell. While the destroyers and merchants broke off the engagement, Libertad and Méndez Núñez engaged Baleares. The cruiser was damaged by several hits from Libertad in critical areas and a fire in the 120 mm (4.7 in) ammunition storeroom, but she limped away successfully. Two Republican freighters changed course to the south during the engagement and ran aground near Cape Cherchell. One of them was lost while the other was salvaged and interned by French authorities.

In March 1938, Baleares—along with fellow Nationalist cruisers Canarias and Almirante Cervera—faced the Republican cruisers Libertad and Méndez Núñez, accompanied by five destroyers, off Cartagena, in the Battle of Cape Palos. At around 02:15 am on 6 March, the Nationalist and Republican cruisers engaged in an ineffective gunnery duel. During this gunnery duel, the Republican destroyers Sánchez Barcáiztegui, Lepanto, and Almirante Antequera all fired their torpedoes. Two or three torpedoes from Lepanto hit Baleares between "A" and "B" turrets, detonating her forward magazine and sinking her. Out of her crew of 1,206, she had 765 seamen killed or missing, among them Vice-Admiral Manuel Vierna Belando, commander of the cruiser division.

The British destroyers Boreas and Kempenfelt rescued part of the survivors, although a Republican air attack interrupted the rescue and caused one British fatality.

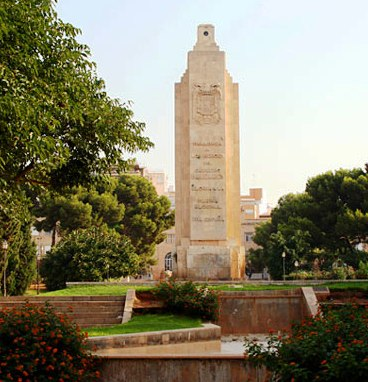
Monument to the cruiser Baleares in Palma de Mallorca

A monument to the crew killed in the sinking of Baleares has been erected in Palma de Mallorca. In the Basque town of Ondárroa, from which many of the crew members came, there are two monuments honoring Baleares, in the port and the cemetery.

== Bibliography ==
- Chesneau, Roger, ed. (1980). Conway's All the World's Fighting Ships 1922–1946. New York: Mayflower Books. ISBN 0-8317-0303-2.
- Whitley, M. J. (1995). Cruisers of World War Two: An International Encyclopedia. London: Cassell. ISBN 1-86019-874-0.
