= Spanish destroyer Lepanto =

Spanish Navy destroyer of 1930–1957

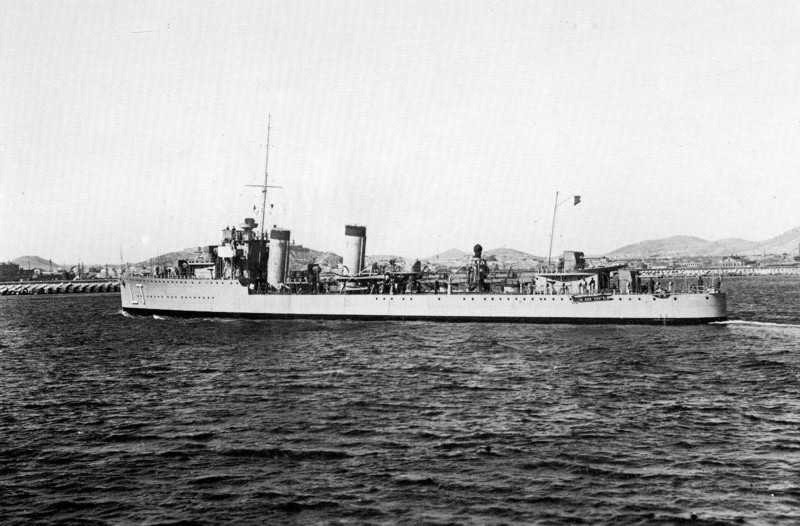
- Destroyer Lepanto

History

Spain
- Name: Lepanto
- Namesake: Battle of Lepanto
- Builder: SECN, Naval Dockyard, Cartagena, Spain
- Launched: 7 November 1929
- Completed: 1930
- Commissioned: 1930
- Decommissioned: 24 May 1957
- Honours and awards: Distintivo de Madrid 1938
- Fate: Scrapped in 1958

General characteristics
- Class & type: Churruca-class destroyer
- Displacement: 1,650 tons (normal); 2,067 tons (maximum)
- Length: 101 m (331 ft 4 in)
- Beam: 9.6 m (31 ft 6 in)
- Draught: 3.3 m (10 ft 10 in)
- Installed power: 4 Yarrow boilers, 42,000 hp (31,000 kW)
- Propulsion: 2 Parsons turbines
- Speed: 36 knots (67 km/h)
- Range: 5,000 nautical miles (9,300 km) at 10 knots (19 km/h); 3,100 nautical miles (5,700 km) at 14 knots (26 km/h)
- Complement: 160
- Armament: 5 × 120 mm (4.7 in) L45 (5x1); 1 × 76 mm (3 in) anti-aircraft gun; 4 × machineguns; 6 × 533 mm (21 in) torpedo tubes (2x3); 2 × depth charge racks

Lepanto was a Churruca-class destroyer of the Spanish Republican Navy. She took part in the Spanish Civil War on the side of the government of the Second Spanish Republic. She was named after the Battle of Lepanto.

== Civil War ==
Lepanto saw a lot of action during the Spanish Civil War. At the start of the hostilities she was involved in the blockade of the Gibraltar Strait to prevent the rebel transport of troops from Spanish Morocco to southern Spain. In the course of these operations she was damaged by rebel aircraft on 5 August 1936, a couple of hours before the convoy known as Convoy de la victoria successfully broke the Republican blockade. In September she joined the squadron which sailed to the Bay of Biscay in support of Republican forces isolated on the northern front. For most of 1937 the destroyer was on convoy duty. While involved in one of these missions, Lepanto took part of the Battle of Cape Cherchell.

At the Battle of Cape Palos, Lepanto together with Sánchez Barcáiztegui and Almirante Antequera, broke away from escorting the cruiser Libertad and fired three torpedoes at the Nationalist heavy cruiser Baleares. Since Lepanto was likely responsible for the fatal hit in the forward magazine that sank the enemy cruiser, she was awarded the Distintivo de Madrid along with other loyalist vessels.

On 5 March 1939, their crews hoping to avoid execution, Lepanto fled Cartagena with the Republican squadron bound for Bizerte, Tunisia, arriving on 11 March. The next day, Commander of the Fleet Miguel Buiza asked for political asylum and the ships were requisitioned by the French authorities and left in the custody by a few crewmen, the rest being held in a prison camp at Meheri Zabbens. Later the rebel transports Mallorca and Marqués de Comillas arrived 31 March 1939 with new crews to take over the ships.

== Post-war ==
On 2 April 1939, just 24 hours after official end of the Civil War, Lepanto and her sister ships which had fought for the Republic sailed back to Spain with new Nationalist crews. They arrived in Cádiz on 5 April.

Participating in an anti-submarine warfare (ASW) exercise on 27 July 1940, Lepanto operated in company with destroyers Alcalá Galiano and Churruca against submarines C2, C4, and General Mola. 24 kilometres (13 nmi) off Morro de la Vaca, Lepanto was running at 14 knots (26 km/h) when C4 broached a few metres off her bow. Unable to change course in time, she ran down the submarine, hitting her broadside between her conning tower and deck gun, cutting C4 in two. C4, commanded at the time by Capitan de Corbeta (Lieutenant Commander) Francisco Reina Carvajal, went down in 300 metres (980 ft) of water. All 44 of her crew were lost with her.

Lepanto was decommissioned 24 May 1957 and scrapped in 1958.
