= Spanish destroyer Almirante Antequera =

Republican Spanish ship

History

Spain
- Name: Almirante Antequera
- Namesake: Juan Bautista Antequera y Bobadilla
- Builder: S.E.C.N in Cartagena
- Launched: 29 December 1930
- Commissioned: 1935
- Fate: Scrapped 8 october 1965

General characteristics
- Class & type: Churruca class
- Displacement: 1536 tons
- Length: 101 m (331.36 ft)
- Beam: 39 ft 8 in (12.1 m)
- Draft: 3.3 m (10.83 ft)
- Installed power: 42,000 shp (31,000 kW)
- Propulsion: 2 × Parsons turbines; 4 × Yarrow boilers; 2 × screws
- Speed: 36 knots (67 km/h; 41 mph)
- Range: 4,500 nmi (5,200 mi; 8,300 km) @ 14 kn (16 mph; 26 km/h)
- Armament: 4 × 120 mm L.45 Vickers cannon; 1 × 76.2 mm A.A cannon; 4 × machine guns; 6 × 533 mm torpedo tubes; 2 × depth charge racks

Almirante Antequera (AA) was a 2nd series Churruca-class destroyer that fought on the Republican side during the Spanish Civil War and, after the war, joined the post-war Spanish Navy. She was named after Juan Bautista Antequera y Bobadilla, a vice admiral and Spanish Minister of the Navy.

== Spanish Civil War ==
At the start of the conflict, Almirante Antequera was in Santander. She sailed to Málaga on 19 July 1936, arriving on 21 July. After a patrol mission, some of her officers who sided with the rebels turned themselves in to the Republican authorities. During the war, she patrolled the area around the Strait of Gibraltar. She also participated in the landings at Ibiza and in the failed Invasion of Majorca, as well as in the Battle of Cape Cherchell, while under the command of Captain Alberto Bayo.

On 17 September 1937, Almirante Antequera along with the destroyers Gravina, Sánchez Barcáiztegui and Escaño, the latter damaged by aerial bombing, engaged the Nationalist heavy cruiser Canarias, which scored a hit on Sánchez Barcáiztegui. She also took part in the Battle of Cape Palos, firing five torpedoes at the enemy cruisers and contributing to the sinking of the Nationalist heavy cruiser Baleares.

On 5 March 1939, she left Cartagena along with most of the Republican fleet following the uprising in the city, reaching Bizerta on 11 March. The next day, the crews solicited political asylum in Tunisia. Most of the ship's crews were interned, with a few Spaniards left to guard the ships. The rest were transported to a concentration camp in Meheri Zabbens.

== After the Civil War ==
On 2 April 1939, merely 24 hours after the war concluded, Almirante Antequera and the other ships that left Cartagena sailed to Cádiz, arriving in the last hours of 5 April. She was scrapped on 8 October 1965.
