= Spanish destroyer Sánchez Barcáiztegui =

Spanish Navy destroyer of 1926–1964

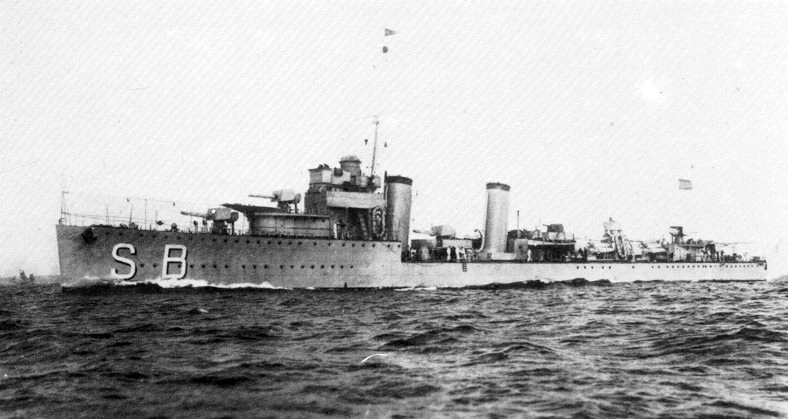
- Destroyer Sánchez Barcaiztegui

History

Spain
- Name: Sánchez Barcáiztegui
- Namesake: Victoriano Sánchez Barcáiztegui
- Builder: SECN, Naval Dockyard, Cartagena, Spain
- Launched: 24 July 1926
- Completed: 1928
- Commissioned: 1928
- Decommissioned: 1 July 1964
- Honours and awards: Distintivo de Madrid 1938
- Fate: Scrapped in 1965

General characteristics
- Class & type: Churruca-class destroyer
- Displacement: 1,650 t (1,620 long tons) (normal); 2,067 t (2,034 long tons) (maximum)
- Length: 101 m (331 ft 4 in)
- Beam: 9.6 m (31 ft 6 in)
- Height: 6.02 m (19 ft 9 in)
- Draft: 3.3 m (10 ft 10 in)
- Installed power: 42,000 shp (31,000 kW)
- Propulsion: 2 × Parsons geared steam turbines; 4 × Yarrow boilers; 2 × shafts
- Speed: 36 kn (67 km/h; 41 mph)
- Range: 5,000 nmi (9,300 km; 5,800 mi) at 10 knots (19 km/h; 12 mph); 3,100 nmi (5,700 km; 3,600 mi) at 14 knots (26 km/h; 16 mph)
- Complement: 160
- Armament: 5 × 120 mm (4.7 in) L45 guns (5x1); 1 × 76.2 mm (3 in) anti-aircraft gun; 4 × machine guns; 6 × 533 mm (21 in) torpedo tubes (2x3); 2 × depth charge racks

Sánchez Barcáiztegui was a Churruca-class destroyer of the Spanish Republican Navy. She took part in the Spanish Civil War on the side of the government of the Second Spanish Republic.

Sánchez Barcáiztegui was named in honor of Capitán de navío de primera clase (Ship-of-the-Line Captain First Class) Victoriano Sánchez Barcáiztegui (1826–1875), a Spanish Navy officer who gained fame in the Battle of Callao in 1866 and was killed in action during the Third Carlist War.

== Service history ==
=== Pre-Spanish Civil War ===
Sánchez Barcáiztegui was launched in Cartagena, Spain in 1926 and commissioned in 1928. She was anchored in Barcelona harbor in 1934, during which time she served as the prison for Manuel Azaña after the Asturian uprising.

=== Spanish Civil War ===
Following the coup of July 1936, the captain took the side of the Nationalists and rebelled, but the crew remained loyal to the Second Spanish Republic and they took over the ship.

Sánchez Barcáiztegui took first part in the blockade of the Gibraltar Strait, then joined a Spanish Republican Navy task force led by the battleship Jaime I that included cruisers Libertad and Miguel de Cervantes, destroyers Almirante Valdés, Almirante Antequera, Almirante Miranda, Alsedo, José Luis Díez, Lepanto, Lazaga, and three C-class submarines. This fleet entered the Cantabrian Sea where Spanish Republican Army troops were isolated from the remaining Republican-controlled territories. All ships, except Ciscar, which had been requisitioned by the Basque Auxiliary Navy, José Luis Díez, two C and two B-class submarines, returned to the Mediterranean Sea.

Sánchez Barcáiztegui took part in the Battle of Cape Palos where she, together with Almirante Antequera and Lepanto, engaged the cruiser Baleares, firing four torpedoes. Sánchez Barcáiztegui was awarded the Distintivo de Madrid along with other vessels.

On 5 March 1939, Sánchez Barcáíztegui was seriously damaged by a bomb after being attacked by five Nationalist Savoia-Marchetti SM.79 medium bombers; the attack also damaged the destroyers Alcalá Galiano and Lazaga.

== Post-war ==
Sánchez Barcáiztegui was refloated in 1940, repaired by the Nationalists, and recommissioned, serving until decommissioned in 1964. She was scrapped in 1965.
