= List of shipwrecks in 1936 =

The list of shipwrecks in 1936 includes ships sunk, foundered, grounded, or otherwise lost during 1936.

table of contents
1936
Jan	Feb	Mar	Apr
May	Jun	Jul	Aug
Sep	Oct	Nov	Dec
Unknown date

== January ==
=== 2 January ===
List of shipwrecks: 2 January 1936
Ship	State	Description
Seiho Maru	Japan	The 990 GRT coaster ran aground at northwest coast of Otaru, Hokkaidō.

=== 3 January ===
List of shipwrecks: 3 January 1936
Ship	State	Description
St. Gerard Magella	flag unknown	The schooner ran aground at Cap-Haïtien, Haiti, and was wrecked.

=== 4 January ===
List of shipwrecks: 4 January 1936
Ship	State	Description
Donetz	Soviet Union	The 1,710 GRT cargo ship on a voyage from Leningrad to Rotterdam with a cargo of grain, struck a mine and sank in the Gulf of Finland off the Styrsudd Lighthouse, Finland with the loss of at least two crew.
Vigor	Sweden	The cargo ship reported that she was 45 nautical miles (83 km) south west of Land's End, Cornwall, United Kingdom. She subsequently foundered, a lifebuoy came ashore in the Isles of Scilly on 8 January.

=== 5 January ===
List of shipwrecks: 5 January 1936
Ship	State	Description
Beryl	United Kingdom	The auxiliary sailing barge fouled her anchor and sank at Cowes, Isle of Wight. All three crew survived.

=== 6 January ===
List of shipwrecks: 6 January 1936
Ship	State	Description
Alice and Jessie	United Kingdom	The coaster foundered in the Atlantic Ocean 6 nautical miles (11 km) off Wedge Island, Nova Scotia, Canada (45°00′N 2°15′E).
Ethel May	United Kingdom	The schooner was blown ashore at Dale, Pembrokeshire and was wrecked.
Shinkyo Maru	Japan	The cargo ship ran aground at Niigata. She was refloated on 16 February.
Vizcaya	Spain	The 948 GRT coaster on a voyage from Bilbao to Palma with a cargo of maize foundered in the Atlantic Ocean, south of Cape Finisterre (42°30′N 9°25′W) with the loss of two of her eighteen crew. Survivors were rescued by Castellon (Spain) and Minna (Estonia).

=== 8 January ===
List of shipwrecks: 8 January 1936
Ship	State	Description
Ciudad de Malaga	Spain	The 1,550 GRT cargo ship on a voyage from Las Palmas to Tenerife collided with Cape of Good Hope (United Kingdom) at Las Palmas, Canary Islands and sank. Salvage efforts were abandoned on 15 May.

=== 9 January ===
List of shipwrecks: 9 January 1936
Ship	State	Description
Bradda	United Kingdom	The 239 GRT coaster on a passage from Birkenhead to Rogerstown with a cargo of coal, foundered in the River Mersey off Formby, Lancashire with the loss of five of her six crew.

=== 12 January ===
List of shipwrecks: 12 January 1936
Ship	State	Description
Ingertre	Norway	The 3,088 GRT cargo ship ran on a passage from Bergen to Narvik in ballast, aground at Florø, Norway and was abandoned by her crew.
Iowa	United States	The Design 1019 cargo ship ran aground on the Columbia Bar in the Columbia River and sank with the loss of all 34 crew.
West Camak	United States	The Design 1019 cargo ship collided with Planet (Germany) in the Scheldt at Terneuzen, Netherlands and was beached.

=== 14 January ===
List of shipwrecks: 14 January 1936
Ship	State	Description
Castro	Chile	The 644 GRT coaster on a voyage from Valparaíso to Puerto Montt with a cargo of coal, ran aground and sank north of Lebu.
Cautin	Chile	The 4,316 GRT cargo liner ran aground at Lobos de Tierra Island, Peru. Passengers were taken off by Chimu (United States). She was declared a total loss.

=== 15 January ===
List of shipwrecks: 15 January 1936
Ship	State	Description
Louisiana	Denmark	The cargo ship ran aground in the River Plate, Argentina. She was refloated on 23 January.
West Hika	United States	The Design 1013 cargo ship on a voyage from Mobile, Alabama to Tyne ran aground at Seaham, County Durham, United Kingdom. Salvage operations were abandoned on 12 February and she was declared a constructive total loss. She was refloated on 6 September.

=== 16 January ===
List of shipwrecks: 16 January 1936
Ship	State	Description
Hilma Bissmark	Germany	The 652 GRT coaster on a passage from Altona to Bergen in ballast, ran off Lyngholmen, Nordland, Norway.
Mehentu	India	The 106 GRT tug on a passage from Bhavnagar to Bombay foundered 53 nautical miles (98 km) north west of Bombay. Fifteen crew were rescued by Bandra (United Kingdom).

=== 17 January ===
List of shipwrecks: 17 January 1936
Ship	State	Description
Cherokee	United States	The cargo liner collided with Welcombe (United Kingdom) in the St. Johns River, at Jacksonville, Florida. Cherokee was beached and Welcombe sank.

=== 18 January ===
List of shipwrecks: 18 January 1936
Ship	State	Description
Meri	Finland	The 151 GRT coaster on a passage from Helsingfors to Stettin with a cargo of coke slack, sprang a leak and sank in the Baltic Sea off Götaland, Sweden. The crew were rescued by Chr. Mathiessen (Sweden).

=== 20 January ===
List of shipwrecks: 20 January 1936
Ship	State	Description
Velasco	United States	The dredger ran aground at Álvaro Obregón, Mexico and was wrecked.

=== 22 January ===
List of shipwrecks: 22 January 1936
Ship	State	Description
Ardri	United Kingdom	The 478 GRT auxiliary three-masted sailing ship on a passage from London to Glasgow with a cargo of cement, foundered in Cardigan Bay. The crew were rescued by Finola (United Kingdom).

=== 23 January ===
List of shipwrecks: 23 January 1936
Ship	State	Description
Colonel Cochrane	United Kingdom	The cargo ship collided with Akroa (United Kingdom) in the River Thames and was consequently beached. She was refloated the next day.

=== 24 January ===
List of shipwrecks: 24 January 1936
Ship	State	Description
Forthbridge	United Kingdom	The 5,140 GRT cargo ship on a passage from Port Alberni to Dairen with a cargo of lumber caught fire in the Sea of Japan (36°33′N 133°27′E). The crew abandoned ship and were rescued by Kahoku Maru (Japan). She came ashore in the Oki Islands and was declared a total loss.

=== 25 January ===
List of shipwrecks: 25 January 1936
Ship	State	Description
Heatherfield	United Kingdom	The 447 GRT coaster ran aground at Robin Hood's Bay, Yorkshire. All crew were rescued by breeches buoy.

=== 27 January ===
List of shipwrecks: 27 January 1936
Ship	State	Description
Meidai Maru	Japan	The cargo ship came ashore at Fukuyama, Hiroshima and sank.
Taycraig	United Kingdom	The 407 GRT coaster on a passage from Plymouth to Newlyn in ballast, hit the Gear Rock, off Penzance promenade, Cornwall. All nine crew were rescued by the Penlee Lifeboat. Taycraig broke up and sank three days later.

=== 28 January ===
List of shipwrecks: 28 January 1936
Ship	State	Description
H. H. Petersen	Denmark	The cargo ship ran aground in Koldingfjord. She was refloated on 1 February.

=== 29 January ===
List of shipwrecks: 29 January 1936
Ship	State	Description
Texas Banker	United States	The cargo ship ran aground at Port Aransas, Texas. She was refloated on 10 February.

=== 30 January ===
List of shipwrecks: 30 January 1936
Ship	State	Description
Chang Ho	China	The 2,664 GRT cargo ship on a voyage with a cargo of cement, ran aground at Kamaishi, Iwate, Japan. She broke in two and sank.

=== 31 January ===
List of shipwrecks: 31 January 1936
Ship	State	Description
Hikosan Maru	Japan	The cargo ship foundered in Hakata Bay with the loss of at least thirteen of her crew.

=== Unknown date ===
List of shipwrecks: Unknown date 1936
Ship	State	Description
Wusueh	United Kingdom	The cargo ship ran aground near Bethune Point, Shanghai, China. She was refloated on 27 February.

== February ==
=== 1 February ===
List of shipwrecks: 1 February 1936
Ship	State	Description
Santa Julia	Peru	The 213 GRT coaster on a passage from Pimentel to Callao with a cargo of rice and sugar, struck the rocks in a dense fog 14 miles off Huarmey, Peru. Two women and six children passengers drowned, while eleven crewmembers, the master and three other passengers were saved.
Tokho Maru	Japan	The cargo ship ran aground at Suttsu, Hokkaidō, Japan, and was a total loss.

=== 3 February ===
List of shipwrecks: 3 February 1936
Ship	State	Description
Parrsboro	United Kingdom	The cargo ship caught fire at Liverpool, Nova Scotia, Canada and was burnt out.

=== 5 February ===
List of shipwrecks: 5 February 1936
Ship	State	Description
Elsie Annie	United Kingdom	The 358 GRT coaster on a passage from Ayr to Wexford with a cargo of coal, ran aground on Wexford Bar and was wrecked.
Pretoria	United Kingdom	The 103.3-foot (31.5 m), 159 GRT steam trawler was sunk when struck by Georgette (United Kingdom) six miles (9.7 km) south southeast of Buchan Ness Lighthouse. The crew were picked up from her boat by Georgette.
Unnan Maru	Japan	The cargo ship foundered in the Pacific Ocean off the Shionomisaki Lighthouse with the loss of all 45 crew.

=== 11 February ===
List of shipwrecks: 11 February 1936
Ship	State	Description
Daunt Rock Lightship	United Kingdom	The lightship was abandoned in the Irish Sea. Her crew were rescued by the Ballycotton Lifeboat.
Rita Garcia	Spain	The cargo ship foundered in the Adriatic Sea off Ancona, Marche, Italy. All 33 crew were rescued. She was refloated on 12 March.

=== 12 February ===
List of shipwrecks: 12 February 1936
Ship	State	Description
Anubis	Germany	The cargo ship was driven ashore at Mersin, Turkey. She was refloated on 20 February.
Aris	Greece	The 307 GRT auxiliary schooner on a passage from Aivali to Piraeus with a cargo of oil cake was wrecked on Andros with the loss of all but one of her crew.
Macedonia	Germany	The cargo ship was driven ashore at Mersin. She was refloated on 20 February.
Pécheuse	France	The schooner foundered in the Atlantic Ocean 72 nautical miles (133 km) east south east of the Fastnet Rock. All six crew were rescued by the trawler Thomas Ansell (United Kingdom).
Polymnia	Greece	The cargo ship ran aground at Cape Rotja, Formentera, Spain. She was refloated on 21 February.

=== 8 February ===
List of shipwrecks: 8 February 1936
Ship	State	Description
Panaghis	Greece	The 181 GRT coaster on voyage to Kavalla with a cargo of tobacco and sugar, ran aground at Epanomi Point with the loss of three crew. Salvage efforts were abandoned.

=== 14 February ===
List of shipwrecks: 14 February 1936
Ship	State	Description
Tung Shun	China	The 2,346 GRT cargo ship on a voyage from Foochow to Haiphong in ballast, ran aground 3 miles south of Mofu Point, Hainan.

=== 15 February ===
List of shipwrecks: 15 February 1936
Ship	State	Description
Üsküdar	Turkey	The cargo ship sank at Zonguldak.

=== 16 February ===
List of shipwrecks: 16 February 1936
Ship	State	Description
Guadarrama	Spain	The dredger came ashore at Cádiz and was wrecked.

=== 17 February ===
List of shipwrecks: 17 February 1936
Ship	State	Description
Lady Elizabeth	United Kingdom	Lady Elizabeth, 1984 The coal hulk was driven ashore in a storm at Stanley Harbour, Falkland Islands. The ship remains beached there.

=== 18 February ===
List of shipwrecks: 18 February 1936
Ship	State	Description
Stefanos Costomenis	Greece	The 5,409 GRT cargo ship on a voyage from Tampa to Rotterdam with a cargo of phosphates, foundered in the Atlantic Ocean 500 nautical miles (930 km) east of New York. All 33 crew were rescued by City of Newport News (United States).

=== 19 February ===
List of shipwrecks: 19 February 1936
Ship	State	Description
USS R-8	United States Navy	The R-class submarine sank at Philadelphia, Pennsylvania. she was subsequently raised but was stricken and sunk as a target on 19 August 1936.

=== 21 February ===
List of shipwrecks: 21 February 1936
Ship	State	Description
Gisla	Norway	The 3,549 GRT freighter with a cargo of 5,000 tons of nitrates caught fire while discharging her cargo at Baltimore. The fire raged for 16 hours and the ship eventually sank after a series of explosions. One fireman died and 21 were injured while fighting the fire. The ship was subsequently sold for scrapping, but later repaired and returned to service in 1938 as Hellenic Pioneer.

=== 22 February ===
List of shipwrecks: 22 February 1936
Ship	State	Description
A.C.W. 11	United Kingdom	The 151-foot (46 m), 378-ton concrete barge dragged anchor in a gale and ran hard aground in The Bay of Franks, Orkney Islands (59°08′N 02°36′W).
Brightside	United Kingdom	The coaster ran aground in the Solent. She was refloated on 29 February.

=== 23 February ===
List of shipwrecks: 23 February 1936
Ship	State	Description
San Marco	Italy	The 278 GRT coaster on a passage from Genoa to Imperia in ballast, was wrecked at Capo Berta. All crew were rescued.

=== 25 February ===
List of shipwrecks: 25 February 1936
Ship	State	Description
Crefeld	Germany	The cargo ship ran aground at Alexandria, Egypt. She was refloated on 28 February.
Gustaf Wasa	Sweden	The 1,382 GRT cargo ship on a voyage from West Hartlepool to Norrkoping with a cargo of coal, ran aground and was wrecked at Arkobadan, Arkösund Skerries.

=== 26 February ===
List of shipwrecks: 26 February 1936
Ship	State	Description
Forsete	Norway	The 537 GRT coaster on apassage from Rekefjord to Harstad with a cargo of herring, foundered outside of Egersund, Norway, with the loss of one crew member.

=== 27 February ===
List of shipwrecks: 27 February 1936
Ship	State	Description
Davenport	United Kingdom	The Thames barge sank in the English Channel off Eastbourne, Sussex. All three crew were rescued by the Eastbourne Lifeboat.

=== 28 February ===
List of shipwrecks: 28 February 1936
Ship	State	Description
Kawsar	Egypt	The cargo ship ran aground at Irk el Gorab. She was still aground on 5 March, but was later refloated.
Lysaker III	Norway	The 1,167 GRT cargo ship departed from Rekefjord, Norway, for Rotterdam, Netherlands with a cargo of ore. No further trace, presumed foundered with the loss of all hands.

=== 29 February ===
List of shipwrecks: 29 February 1936
Ship	State	Description
Alaskan	United States	The 29-gross register ton motor vessel sank in 690 feet (210 m) of water in Stephens Passage in the Alexander Archipelago in Southeast Alaska approximately two nautical miles (3.7 km; 2.3 mi) north of Slocum Inlet (58°09′N 134°05′W) eight hours after she began flooding due to a failure of her propeller shaft and an attempt to beach her failed. Her crew of two survived.
Franz; Patrão Lopez	Germany; Portugal	The German barge, which had been recovered after drifting off the Lisbon Bar, was being towed into the River Tagus by the Portuguese salvage vessel alongside. Franz ran aground off Cascais, near the Bugio Lighthouse and, in sinking, her masts punctured the hull of the salvage vessel. Both vessels became total losses.
Harriet	Sweden	The auxiliary schooner collided with a breakwater at Copenhagen, Denmark and sank.
Renfrew Ferry	United Kingdom	The ferry sprang a leak and sank in the Caledonian Canal.
Wexfordian	United Kingdom	The 809 GRT coaster on a voyage from Glasgow to Wexford with a cargo of coal, ran aground on South Dogger Bank, near Wexford, and was wrecked. The crew was taken off the ship on 8 March by a local lifeboat.

== March ==
=== 2 March ===
List of shipwrecks: 2 March 1936
Ship	State	Description
Condor	Germany	The schooner collided with Walter L M Russ (Germany) in the Kaiser Wilhelm Canal and sank.
Hong Keat	United Kingdom	The passenger ship caught fire and sank in the Strait of Singapore. All 61 people on board were rescued.

=== 6 March ===
List of shipwrecks: 6 March 1936
Ship	State	Description
Horsia	Denmark	The cargo ship ran aground at Stubbekøbing, Sjælland. She was refloated on 11 March.

=== 7 March ===
List of shipwrecks: 7 March 1936
Ship	State	Description
Unknown	Germany	A cargo ship sprang a leak in the Atlantic Ocean (48°18′N 4°02′W). She was taken in tow by Abeille No.22 (France) and beached in Bertheaume Bay, Finistère, France.

=== 8 March ===
List of shipwrecks: 8 March 1936
Ship	State	Description
Sea Fisher	United Kingdom	The 552 GRT coaster on a passage from Blyth to Hayle with a cargo of coal, collided with Sutherland (United Kingdom) in the North Sea off the Shipwash Lightship (United Kingdom) and sank. All crew were rescued.

=== 10 March ===
List of shipwrecks: 10 March 1936
Ship	State	Description
Alko	Netherlands	The 200 GRT coaster on a passage from Par to Leith with a cargo of China clay, collided with the fishing vessel Leyland (United Kingdom) in the North Sea 20 nautical miles (37 km) north north west of Flamborough Head, Yorkshire, United Kingdom and sank.
Aghios Spyridon	Greece	The 1,581 GRT cargo ship with a cargo of carbon disulfide caught fire at Lavrio and was later declared a total loss.
Nadod	Norway	The 893 GRT coaster on a passage from Goole to Calais with a cargo of coal, collided with Salerno (United Kingdom in the River Humber and sank. All sixteen crew were rescued.
Phyllis	United States	The cargo ship came ashore 200 nautical miles (370 km) south of the mouth of the Columbia River and was wrecked. The crew survived.
Pink Rose	United Kingdom	The 739 GRT coaster on a passage from Tyne to Shoreham with a cargo of coke, collided with George Frusher (United Kingdom in the North Sea 11 nautical miles (20 km) south east of the mouth of the River Tyne and sank. All crew were rescued.

=== 13 March ===
List of shipwrecks: 13 March 1936
Ship	State	Description
Jose Cristobal	flag unknown	The tanker exploded at Bahía de Caráquez, Ecuador and was a total loss.
Marchigiano	Italy	The 746 GRT coaster on a passage from Genoa to Assab with a cargo of benzine suffered an explosion and sank in the Red Sea 125 nautical miles (232 km) off Port Sudan, Sudan (22°47′N 36°56′E) with the loss of ten of her seventeen crew. Survivors were rescued by Brighton (United Kingdom).

=== 14 March ===
List of shipwrecks: 14 March 1936
Ship	State	Description
Styliani	Greece	The 1,828 GRT cargo ship on a passage from Suez to Massawah with a cargo of petrol caught fire, exploded and sank in the Red Sea (approximately 17°N 39°E). Her crew were rescued by Fusijama (Italy).
Winooka	United Kingdom	The 137.5-foot (41.9 m), 320 GRT trawler was sunk in a collision with trawler Ethyl Taylor (United Kingdom) off St. Kilda. Three crew killed. Survivors rescued by Ethyl Taylor.

=== 15 March ===
List of shipwrecks: 15 March 1936
Ship	State	Description
Volsella	United Kingdom	The cargo ship ran aground at Port Hedland, Western Australia. She was refloated on 23 March.
Winooka	United Kingdom	The 137.4-foot (41.9 m), 334-ton steam trawler was sunk in a collision with Ethel Taylor (United Kingdom) off St Kilda. Three crew were killed. Survivors were rescued by Ethel Taylor.

=== 17 March ===
List of shipwrecks: 17 March 1936
Ship	State	Description
Partanna	United Kingdom	The schooner departed from St. John's, Newfoundland for the Newfoundland fishing grounds. No further trace.

=== 18 March ===
List of shipwrecks: 18 March 1936
Ship	State	Description
Siantar	Netherlands	The cargo ship ran aground at Makassar, Dutch East Indies (approximately 5°S 119°E). She was refloated on 24 March.

=== 19 March ===
List of shipwrecks: 19 March 1936
Ship	State	Description
Hamilton	United Kingdom	The coaster ran aground at Southend, Argyllshire.

=== 21 March ===
List of shipwrecks: 21 March 1936
Ship	State	Description
France Maru	Japan	The cargo ship ran aground on Baliguan Island. (11°13′N 132°20′E). She was refloated on 26 March.

=== 26 March ===
List of shipwrecks: 26 March 1936
Ship	State	Description
Boree	France	The 1,882 GRT cargo ship on a voyage from Tyne to Caen with a cargo of coal, collided with Aizkarai Mendi (Spain) in the North Sea 24 nautical miles (44 km) north west of Cromer, Norfolk, United Kingdom and sank with the loss of nine of her 22 crew. Survivors were rescued by Aizkarai Mendi, Caduceus (United Kingdom) and the Wells and Cromer lifeboats.
Panagiotis Th. Coumantaros	Greece	The cargo ship ran aground at Abu Zenima, Egypt. Her captain committed suicide.

=== 27 March ===
List of shipwrecks: 27 March 1936
Ship	State	Description
Esbo	Finland	The cargo ship sank in the North Sea 4 nautical miles (7.4 km) south east of Craig, Angus. All crew were rescued by Vanguard (United Kingdom). Like the original wreck in October 1935 the cited report is incorrect-see Whitehaven News 2 Apr 1936 page 4. She had been refloated at the 7th attempt on 26 March 1936 and was being towed to Troon, Firth of Clyde, Scotland, for breaking up. She sprang a leak and sank in deep water about 15 miles off Troon.

=== 28 March ===
List of shipwrecks: 28 March 1936
Ship	State	Description
Eskburn	United Kingdom	The coaster ran aground in Lunan Bay. She was refloated on 19 May 1937.
Osterhav	Finland	The 4,293 GRT cargo ship on a passage from Raumo to Ellesmere Port with a cargo of wood pulp, ran aground south of Duncansby Head, Sutherland, United Kingdom in thick fog. She was refloated but was leaking severely and was consequently beached in Sinclair Bay. The crew subsequently abandoned ship. She was refloated on 31 August. The ship was declared a total loss and later scrapped.

=== 29 March ===
List of shipwrecks: 29 March 1936
Ship	State	Description
Chancellor	United Kingdom	The 105.6-foot (32.2 m), 168-ton steam trawler sank 20 miles (32 km) west southwest of Cape Wrath. Crew rescued from her boat by "Sola" (United Kingdom)
Inga I	Norway	The 1,183 GRT cargo ship on a passage from Cardiff to Porto with a cargo of coal, ran aground at the mouth of Douro river. The crew were rescued by the Porto Lifeboat.

=== 31 March ===
List of shipwrecks: 31 March 1936
Ship	State	Description
Toyohiko Maru	Japan	The cargo ship ran aground at Haiphong, French Indo-China (20°43′N 107°27′E). She was refloated on 25 April.

== April ==
=== 1 April ===
List of shipwrecks: 1 April 1936
Ship	State	Description
Barle	United Kingdom	The 135.2-foot (41.2 m), 283-ton steam trawler was wrecked after running aground 500 yards (460 m) east of Mull of Oa, Islay. Her crew rowed to shore in her boat.

=== 3 April ===
List of shipwrecks: 3 April 1936
Ship	State	Description
Taiko Maru No.3	Japan	The coaster foundered off Nagasaki with the loss of fourteen lives.

=== 5 April ===
List of shipwrecks: 5 April 1936
Ship	State	Description
Maddalena Odero	Italy	The cargo ship ran aground at Key West, Florida, United States. She was refloated on 8 April.

=== 7 April ===
List of shipwrecks: 7 April 1936
Ship	State	Description
Georgios	Greece	The auxiliary schooner ran aground at Likhades Island and consequently foundered.
Santa Flavia	United States	The 2,113 GRT cannery ship undergoing an overhaul at Seattle, caught fire and was destroyed. One person was killed.
Scotland Maru	Japan	The 5,863 GRT cargo ship on a passage from Port Sudan to Moji with a cargo of salt ran aground at Osima, Kagashima and consequently sank.
Vancouver	Germany	The cargo liner struck rocks at Point Remedios and was beached at Acajutla, El Salvador, where the passengers were taken off. She was refloated on 22 April.

=== 8 April ===
List of shipwrecks: 8 April 1936
Ship	State	Description
Saint Elme	France	The 398 GRT coaster on a passage from Marseille to Nice ran aground off Pointe Saint-Marc near Théoule-sur-Mer, and subsequently sank.

=== 14 April ===
List of shipwrecks: 14 April 1936
Ship	State	Description
USS Smith Thompson	United States Navy	The Clemson-class destroyer was rammed amidships by the destroyer USS Whipple (United States Navy) during exercises in Subic Bay in the Philippines. No lives lost. Towed back to base by the destroyer USS Barker (United States Navy), she was deemed beyond economical repair. She was decommissioned and sunk as a target on 25 July 1935.
USS Whipple	United States Navy	The Clemson-class destroyer rammed the destroyer USS Smith Thompson (United States Navy) during exercises in Subic Bay in the Philippines. No lives lost. Although her bow was bent around backwards, Whipple was repaired using Smith Thompson's undamaged bow and returned to service.

=== 15 April ===
List of shipwrecks: 15 April 1936
Ship	State	Description
City of St. Joseph	United States	The cargo ship was burnt out at Benton Harbor, Michigan.

=== 16 April ===
List of shipwrecks: 16 April 1936
Ship	State	Description
Terningen	Norway	The auxiliary three-masted sealing schooner was crushed by ice and sank. All crew were rescued by Sedov (Soviet Union).

=== 17 April ===
List of shipwrecks: 17 April 1936
Ship	State	Description
Delphinus	Sweden	The cargo ship ran aground in Lake Cener and sank.
Iciar	Spain	The cargo ship was driven ashore at Bilbao and was wrecked.

=== 20 April ===
List of shipwrecks: 20 April 1936
Ship	State	Description
Hiram	Norway	The cargo liner ran aground on Green Island, China and was beached. Passengers were rescued by Kinngsu (United Kingdom). She was refloated later that day.
Prospect	Norway	The 442 GRT coaster on a passage from Mo to Tyne with a cargo of timber, collided with Canis (Norway) at Stavanger, Norway and sank.

=== 22 April ===
List of shipwrecks: 22 April 1936
Ship	State	Description
Uromi	United Kingdom	The cargo ship was scuttled off Lagos, Nigeria.

=== 23 April ===
List of shipwrecks: 23 April 1936
Ship	State	Description
Hanasaki Maru	Japan	The cargo ship ran aground at Ebeko, Kuril Islands, Soviet Union (50°40′N 156°08′E). She was refloated on 25 May.
Wan Tai	China	The coaster was hit by Terukuni Maru (Japan) at Dairen and sank.

=== 25 April ===
List of shipwrecks: 25 April 1936
Ship	State	Description
Herzogin Cecilie	Finland	Herzogin Cecilie The 3,111 GRT four-masted barque on a passage from Port Lincoln to Ipswich with a cargo of grain ran around on the Ham Stone Rock, near Bolt Head, Devon, United Kingdom. She was beached at Starhole Bay but was wrecked there by the action of the waves and subsequently sold for scrapping.

=== 27 April ===
List of shipwrecks: 27 April 1936
Ship	State	Description
Nordland	Germany	The 6,559 GRT cargo ship caught fire while unloading her cargo of benzine at Mogadishu, Italian Somaliland. The vessel was beached and later declared a total loss.

=== 29 April ===
List of shipwrecks: 29 April 1936
Ship	State	Description
Hansa	Norway	The 1,137 GRT cargo ship on a passage from Rotterdam to Bergen with a cargo of manure and coke ran aground and was beached at Lista, Norway. She was refloated on 4 May, and subsequently sold for scrapping.
Mrav	Yugoslavia	The 3,870 GRT cargo ship on a passage from Antwerp to Dubrovnik with general cargo, collided with Mari (Estonia) in the English Channel 5 nautical miles (9.3 km) off Dungeness, Kent, United Kingdom and sank. All crew were rescued by Mari.
Portugal	Belgium	The cargo ship caught fire at Alicante, Spain and sank. She was refloated on 2 May.

=== 30 April ===
List of shipwrecks: 30 April 1936
Ship	State	Description

== May ==
=== 1 May ===
List of shipwrecks: 1 May 1936
Ship	State	Description
Cedarberg	United Kingdom	The coaster came ashore 10 nautical miles (19 km) from Lamberts Bay, South Africa and was a total loss.

=== 4 May ===
List of shipwrecks: 4 May 1936
Ship	State	Description
James A. Lewis	United States	The cargo ship caught fire in Chesapeake Bay and burnt down to the waterline.
Katingo	Greece	The 2,578 GRT cargo ship collided with Assunzione (Italy) in the Bay of Biscay off Ouessant, Finistère, France (48°10′N 6°08′W). She was abandoned by her crew, who were rescued by Assunzione. Katingo was taken in tow by Abeille No.24 (France), which made for Brest. Katingo subsequently foundered. One crew member was lost.

=== 5 May ===
List of shipwrecks: 5 May 1936
Ship	State	Description
Birtley	United Kingdom	The cargo ship ran aground near the Souter Lighthouse, County Durham. She was refloated on 2 December.
Mishima	Imperial Japanese Navy	The decommissioned submarine tender – formerly an Admiral Ushakov-class coastal defense ship – was sunk as a target by aircraft from the aircraft carrier Hōshō (Imperial Japanese Navy) in the Pacific Ocean off Kushima, Miyazaki Prefecture, Japan.

=== 6 May ===
List of shipwrecks: 6 May 1936
Ship	State	Description
Chasmoor	United Kingdom	The 706 GRT coastal collier on a passage from Dublin to Newport in ballast, ran aground on Bishops and Clerks, Pembrokeshire and sank. The crew were rescued by Dublin (United Kingdom).

=== 7 May ===
List of shipwrecks: 7 May 1936
Ship	State	Description
Alphard	Netherlands	The 3,551 GRT cargo ship on a passage from Rotterdam to Melilla in ballast, collided with New York (Germany) in the North Sea north of Ostend, Belgium and sank. All 26 crew were rescued by New York.
HMAS Anzac	Royal Australian Navy	The decommissioned Parker-class destroyer leader was sunk as a target in the Tasman Sea off Sydney Heads, Australia.

=== 8 May ===
List of shipwrecks: 8 May 1936
Ship	State	Description
West Cape	United States	The cargo ship struck a rock in the Columbia River 12 nautical miles (22 km) upstream of Astoria, Oregon and was consequently beached. She was refloated the next day.

=== 11 May ===
List of shipwrecks: 11 May 1936
Ship	State	Description
Oldenburg	Germany	The 1,316 GRT cargo liner on a passage from Larache to Hamburg with general cargo ran aground at Espozende, Portugal and sank. All on board survived.

=== 12 May ===
List of shipwrecks: 12 May 1936
Ship	State	Description
Rodi	Italy	The cargo ship sank at Durrës, Albania.

=== 13 May ===
List of shipwrecks: 13 May 1936
Ship	State	Description
Ming Chiang	China	The ship sank off Wanhsien with the loss of over 40 lives.

=== 14 May ===
List of shipwrecks: 14 May 1936
Ship	State	Description
Hiawatha	United States	The 8-gross register ton fishing vessel sank in rough weather about 1.5 nautical miles (2.8 km; 1.7 mi) off Caamano Point (55°30′N 131°58′W) in Southeast Alaska. Her crew of two survived.

=== 15 May ===
List of shipwrecks: 15 May 1936
Ship	State	Description
USS S-4	United States Navy	The decommissioned S-class submarine was scuttled as a means of disposal.

=== 16 May ===
List of shipwrecks: 16 May 1936
Ship	State	Description
Koan Maru	Japan	The cargo ship sank at Hakodate.

=== 18 May ===
List of shipwrecks: 18 May 1936
Ship	State	Description
Dela	United Kingdom	The 129 GRT coaster on a passage from Fingringhoe to London with a cargo of sand, ran aground on Buxey Sands, near Clacton-on-Sea, Essex and was subsequently wrecked.

=== 19 May ===
List of shipwrecks: 19 May 1936
Ship	State	Description
Mars	Latvia	The coaster ran aground on the Isle of May, Fife, United Kingdom. She broke her back on 21 May and subsequently broke up.

=== 28 May ===
List of shipwrecks: 28 May 1936
Ship	State	Description
Hogstad	Norway	The 696 GRT coaster on a voyage from Dunston to Svelgen with a cargo of coke foundered in the North Sea (58°38′N 4°22′E) with the loss of twelve of her thirteen crew. The survivor was rescued by Westplein (Netherlands).

=== 29 May ===
List of shipwrecks: 29 May 1936
Ship	State	Description
Ethel Radcliffe	United Kingdom	The cargo ship ran aground at Alexandria, Egypt. She was refloated on 3 June.

=== 31 May ===
List of shipwrecks: 31 May 1936
Ship	State	Description
Alice	United Kingdom	The ketch was driven ashore in Palm Bay, Margate, Kent. All five crew waded ashore.

== June ==
=== 6 June ===
List of shipwrecks: 6 June 1936
Ship	State	Description
Magnhild	Norway	The 1,135 GRT cargo ship on a passage from Halifax to St. Jonh's, Newfoundland with a cargo of coal came ashore at Mistaken Point, Newfoundland and became a total loss.

=== 9 June ===
List of shipwrecks: 9 June 1936
Ship	State	Description
W. N. Dicks	flag unknown	The schooner sprang a leak and sank in the Atlantic Ocean 25 nautical miles (46 km) off Miquelon.

=== 11 June ===
List of shipwrecks: 11 June 1936
Ship	State	Description
Aycliffe Hall	United Kingdom	The cargo ship collided with A. P. Berwind (flag unknown) in Lake Erie and sank. The crew were rescued by A. P. Berwind.

=== 12 June ===
List of shipwrecks: 12 June 1936
Ship	State	Description
Eilianus	United Kingdom	The 718 GRT coaster on a passage from Havre to Briton Ferry with a cargo of scrap iron ran aground 5 nautical miles (9.3 km) south of Hartland Point, Devon and was wrecked.

=== 14 June ===
List of shipwrecks: 14 June 1936
Ship	State	Description
Rudolph N	United States	The 29-gross register ton, 51.9-foot (15.8 m) motor vessel caught fire after her gasoline engine backfired while she was moored at the Nakeem Cannery, 1.5 miles (2.4 km) north of Telephone Point (58°46′10″N 157°02′15″W) on the west bank of the Kvichak River in the Territory of Alaska. After the fire went out of control, the vessels Fanny and Nakeen (both United States) towed her out into the river, where the fire destroyed her. Her crew of four survived.

=== 18 June ===
List of shipwrecks: 18 June 1936
Ship	State	Description
Chrysopolis	Greece	The 5,291 GRT cargo liner on a voyage from Emden to Cape Town in ballast ran aground at Cape Barbas, Morocco. She was abandoned on 21 June and the crew were rescued by Temple Mead (United Kingdom).

=== 19 June ===
List of shipwrecks: 19 June 1936
Ship	State	Description
Ariadne Pandeli	Greece	The cargo ship caught fire at Salvador, Bahia, Brazil. She exploded and capsized on 25 June and was a total loss.
Tashmoo	United States	The passenger steamboat struck a rock and sank in the Detroit River at Amherstburg, Ontario, Canada.

=== 21 June ===
List of shipwrecks: 21 June 1936
Ship	State	Description
Ben Vooar	United Kingdom	The 227 GRT coaster on a passage from Birkenhead to Coleraine with a cargo of coal sprang a leak near Castlerock. She was beached at Portrush, County Antrim and was abandoned by her crew.
El Kantara	France	The passenger ship sank off Palamós, Catalonia, Spain. All on board, including 450 passengers, were rescued.

=== 22 June ===
List of shipwrecks: 22 June 1936
Ship	State	Description

=== 24 June ===
List of shipwrecks: 24 June 1936
Ship	State	Description
Stanford	Norway	The 4,803 GRT cargo liner on a passage from London to Geraldton with a cargo of coke and cement ran aground on a reef 2 nautical miles (3.7 km) off Geraldton, Western Australia and was wrecked.

=== 25 June ===
List of shipwrecks: 25 June 1936
Ship	State	Description
Baron Ogilvy	United Kingdom	The cargo ship ran aground at Isla Palenque, Panama. She was refloated on 21 July.

=== 28 June ===
List of shipwrecks: 28 June 1936
Ship	State	Description
Navahoe	United States	The schooner barge was scuttled in the Atlantic Ocean 50 nautical miles (93 km) north of Dragon's Mouth, Trinidad.
Neptun	Denmark	The coaster ran aground in the River Humber at Brough, Yorkshire and was a total loss. All crew survived.

=== 29 June ===
List of shipwrecks: 29 June 1936
Ship	State	Description
Luciano A	Italy	The schooner sprang a leak and sank in the Mediterranean Sea 5 nautical miles (9.3 km) east of Cape Comino.
Dagfinn	Sweden	The cargo ship sprang a leak and sank in the Kattegat 10 nautical miles (19 km) off the Ostreflak Lightship (Denmark). All crew were rescued by the trawler Betania (flag unknown).

== July ==
=== 2 July ===
List of shipwrecks: 2 July 1936
Ship	State	Description
Eagle	United States	The 20-gross register ton motor vessel was destroyed by a gasoline explosion and fire at Unga, Territory of Alaska. Her crew of four survived.
Sima	United Kingdom	The passenger ship ran aground on Onekotan, Kuril Islands. She was refloated on 8 July.

=== 3 July ===
List of shipwrecks: 3 July 1936
Ship	State	Description
Hirosaki Maru	Japan	The 1,354 GRT cargo ship on a passage from Honto to Odomari with general cargo, ran aground at Cape Notoro, Sakhalin, and was wrecked.

=== 4 July ===
List of shipwrecks: 4 July 1936
Ship	State	Description
Carl XV	Sweden	The 547 GRT passenger-cargo ship on a passage from Sundsvall to Vasa with passengers and general cargo, ran aground at Storkallegrund south of the Strommingsbadan Lighthouse and sank. All 62 people on board were rescued by Vollrath Tham (Sweden) or reached shore in their lifeboats.
Culberson	United States	The cargo ship ran aground 4 nautical miles (7.4 km) south west of Punta Mogotes, Argentina. She was refloated on 8 July.
Maja	Sweden	The 1,281 GRT cargo ship on a voyage from Hartlepool to Kopmanholmen with a cargo of coal, ran aground and sank at Trysunda.

=== 6 July ===
List of shipwrecks: 6 July 1936
Ship	State	Description
Sol Nascente	Portugal	The schooner foundered in the Atlantic Ocean off the Cape Verde Islands. All crew survived.
St Aubin	United Kingdom	The tug was rammed and sunk at Whampoo, Hong Kong by Pingan (China).

=== 7 July ===
List of shipwrecks: 7 July 1936
Ship	State	Description
Alice	United States	The 31-ton fishing steamer was destroyed by fire while on a slipway on the Bristol Bay coast of the Territory of Alaska.

=== 8 July ===
List of shipwrecks: 8 July 1936
Ship	State	Description
USS Alton	United States Navy	After being sold out of naval service, the decommissioned accommodation ship – formerly the protected cruiser USS Chicago – foundered in the Pacific Ocean while under tow from Honolulu, Hawaii, to San Francisco, California, for delivery to her buyers.
Marguerite	United States	The 19-gross register ton motor vessel caught fire after suffering an explosion while docked at "Snug Harbor" – possibly Snug Harbor (60°15′N 147°43′W) on Knight Island in western Prince William Sound – on the south-central coast of the Territory of Alaska. She was cut loose from the dock and sank. Her crew of three survived.
Nunoca	United Kingdom	The coaster departed Georgetown, Grand Cayman for Tampa, Florida, United States. She subsequently caught fire and foundered in the Gulf of Mexico off Dry Tortugas with the loss of all 22 people on board.

=== 9 July ===
List of shipwrecks: 9 July 1936
Ship	State	Description
Leonian	United Kingdom	The cargo ship ran aground at the mouth of the Forcados River, Burutu, Nigeria. She was refloated on 15 July.

=== 12 July ===
List of shipwrecks: 12 July 1936
Ship	State	Description
Choyo Maru	Japan	The cargo ship ran aground on the east coast of Sakhalin, Soviet Union. She was declared a total loss on 16 July.
Fjord	Norway	The 2,155 GRT cargo ship on a passage from New York to Port Medway in ballast, ran aground and sank in dense fog near Ram Island Rocks, outside of Lockeport, Nova Scotia.

=== 13 July ===
List of shipwrecks: 13 July 1936
Ship	State	Description
Cabo Blanco	Spain	The 2,163 GRT cargo ship on a voyage from Huelva to Vigo with general cargo, ran aground near the Montedor Lighthouse, Portugal. All on board were rescued but she was a total loss.

=== 14 July ===
List of shipwrecks: 14 July 1936
Ship	State	Description
Golden Harvest	United States	The cargo ship collided with State of Virginia (United States) off the Seven Foot Knoll Lighthouse, Maryland. Both vessels were beached.
Wagrien	Germany	The cargo ship departed from Leningrad, Soviet Union for Gdynia, Poland. She subsequently foundered with the loss of all hands. Wreckage from the ship washed up on Saaremaa, Estonia on 19 July.

=== 15 July ===
List of shipwrecks: 15 July 1936
Ship	State	Description
Taurau	United Kingdom	The tug struck a rock and sank off Dartmouth, Devon, England. The crew were rescued by the fishing vessel Owl (United Kingdom).
Maranon	Peru	The transport ship struck a rock and sank 180 nautical miles (330 km) south of Lima, Peru.

=== 18 July ===
List of shipwrecks: 18 July 1936
Ship	State	Description
Abel Tasman	United Kingdom	The 2,047 GRT cargo ship moored at her coaling berth at Greymouth, New Zealand was swept away in the river flood and became a total wreck after settling against the rocks on North Beach.
Oso	United States	The 8-gross register ton salmon troller began flooding and sank 20 minutes later in the Gulf of Alaska off Lituya Bay on the coast of the Territory of Alaska. The motor vessel Mine (United States) rescued her two-man crew.

=== 19 July ===
List of shipwrecks: 19 July 1936
Ship	State	Description
Nora Maersk	Denmark	The cargo ship caught fire at Zamboanga, Philippines. She was severely damaged and was declared a constructive total loss.

=== 20 July ===
List of shipwrecks: 20 July 1936
Ship	State	Description
Don Carlos	Chile	The 2,017 GRT cargo ship left Lota to Tocopilla with a cargo of coal and clay goods on 18 July 1936. Last reported from 32°45′S 72°16′W. No further trace, presumed foundered.
Garada	United Kingdom	The 5,333 GRT cargo ship on a passage from Karachi to Calcutta with a cargo of cotton and grain, caught fire soon after arrival at Cuddalore. The vessel was beached, but later declared a total loss.

=== 21 July ===
List of shipwrecks: 21 July 1936
Ship	State	Description
Isidoro Pons	Philippines	The 1,027 GRT cargo ship ran aground in Zambales Province, Luzon, Philippines and sank.

=== 22 July ===
List of shipwrecks: 22 July 1936
Ship	State	Description
Don Carlos	Chile	The collier foundered in the Pacific Ocean 50 nautical miles (93 km) off Valparaíso with the loss of all hands.

=== 23 July ===
List of shipwrecks: 23 July 1936
Ship	State	Description
Virgilia	Germany	The cargo ship collided with Bury (United Kingdom) in the Elbe at the Graueror Fortress and was beached.

=== 24 July ===
List of shipwrecks: 24 July 1936
Ship	State	Description
Martin Bakke	Norway	The cargo ship collided with a buoy and sank in the Victoria Channel, Belfast, County Antrim, United Kingdom.

=== 25 July ===
List of shipwrecks: 25 July 1936
Ship	State	Description
USS Smith Thompson	United States Navy	The decommissioned Clemson-class destroyer was sunk as a target off Subic Bay in the Philippines.

=== 27 July ===
List of shipwrecks: 27 July 1936
Ship	State	Description
Skipjack	United Kingdom	The cargo ship was rammed at Great Yarmouth, Norfolk by Maise Graham (United Kingdom) and was consequently beached.

=== 28 July ===
List of shipwrecks: 28 July 1936
Ship	State	Description
Cinta Nu 1	Spanish Navy	Spanish Civil War: The auxiliary patrol ship was lost on this date.
Material Service	United States	The cargo ship capsized and sank off the South Chicago Piers, Lake Michigan with the loss of fifteen crew.
Svend	Sweden	The galeass collided with Alca (Finland) off Copenhagen, Denmark and sank. All crew were rescued by Alca.

=== 30 July ===
List of shipwrecks: 30 July 1936
Ship	State	Description
Nora	Denmark	The cargo ship collided with Poul Moller (Denmark) of Copenhagen and sank. All crew were rescued by Poul Moller.

== August ==
=== 3 August ===
List of shipwrecks: 3 August 1936
Ship	State	Description
Landfort	Spain	Spanish Civil War: The coaster was sunk as a blockship at Sanlúcar de Barrameda, Cádiz, Spain.
Viktor	Estonia	The sailing ship struck rocks on the west side of St. Kilda, Outer Hebrides, United Kingdom, and sprang a leak. She was abandoned by her crew, and came ashore on Shillay.

=== 4 August ===
List of shipwrecks: 4 August 1936
Ship	State	Description
Emmirson	United States	The 17-gross register ton, 37.4-foot (11.4 m) fishing vessel sank near Chignik, Territory of Alaska.

=== 5 August ===
List of shipwrecks: 5 August 1936
Ship	State	Description
Ocean Hope	United Kingdom	The fishing drifter sank after collision with the trawler Fernbank (United Kingdom), 5 miles (8.0 km) off Fraserburgh, Scotland; the crew were all rescued.
USS Radford	United States Navy	The Wickes-class destroyer was sunk as a target in accordance with the London Naval Treaty.

=== 6 August ===
List of shipwrecks: 6 August 1936
Ship	State	Description
Antonios Vrondisis	Greece	The cargo ship ran aground at Kem, Soviet Union. She was refloated on 11 August but found to be severely damaged.

=== 7 August ===
List of shipwrecks: 7 August 1936
Ship	State	Description
Christos Markettas	Greece	The cargo ship ran aground in the Paraná River at Ramallo, Buenos Aires, Argentina. She was refloated on 14 August.
Eduardo Dato	Spanish Navy	Spanish Civil War: The Antonio Canovas del Castillo-class gunboat was shelled and sunk at Algeciras by Jaime I (Spanish Navy). Raised later in August and repaired by February 1937.
San Francisco	France	The cargo ship ran aground on the Haisborough Sands off the coast of Norfolk, United Kingdom. She was refloated on 12 August.

=== 9 August ===
List of shipwrecks: 9 August 1936
Ship	State	Description
Blue Shadow	United Kingdom	Spanish Civil War: The yacht was shelled and wrecked by the Nationalist cruiser Almirante Cervera (Spanish Navy) at Gijón with the loss of one of her two crew. The hull was later saved by her owner.

=== 12 August ===
List of shipwrecks: 12 August 1936
Ship	State	Description
USS Champlin	United States Navy	The decommissioned Wickes-class destroyer was sunk in the Pacific Ocean during experimental tests.
Rooiberg	United Kingdom	The whaler struck a rock in Saldanha Bay and sank. She was declared a total loss.

=== 13 August ===
List of shipwrecks: 13 August 1936
Ship	State	Description
Oranaise	France	The 1,806 GRT cargo liner on a voyage from Mostaganem to Cette with a cargo of wine and cereals capsized and sank in the Mediterranean Sea 40 nautical miles (74 km) off Mostaganem, Algeria with the loss of 38 of the 40 people on board. The capsizing was most likely caused by cargo shift.

=== 14 August ===
List of shipwrecks: 14 August 1936
Ship	State	Description
Eubee	France	The passenger ship collided with Corinaldo (United Kingdom) in the Atlantic Ocean 90 nautical miles (170 km) north of Rio Grande do Norte, Brazil. Eubee was left with her engine room flooded, and five stokers killed. Passengers were taken off by Corinaldo. Eubee was taken in tow by Antonio Azambuja (Brazil) and Powerful (Uruguay), but she foundered on 16 August. The crew were rescued by Antonio Azambuja.

=== 15 August ===
List of shipwrecks: 15 August 1936
Ship	State	Description
USC&GS Fathomer	United States Coast and Geodetic Survey	USC&GS Fathomer. The survey ship was driven aground on a reef at Port San Vincente, Philippines in a typhoon. She was later refloated, repaired and returned to service.

=== 17 August ===
List of shipwrecks: 17 August 1936
Ship	State	Description
Muscallonge	flag unknown	The tug was burnt out at Brockville, Ontario, Canada.
Sunning	United Kingdom	The cargo ship was wrecked at Hong Kong in a typhoon. She broke her back and was a total loss.

=== 19 August ===
List of shipwrecks: 19 August 1936
Ship	State	Description
USS R-8	United States Navy	The R-class submarine was sunk as a target by aerial bombing in the Atlantic Ocean off Cape Henry, Virginia. Her wreck was discovered in 2020 in approximately 293 feet (89 m) of water, 52.89 nautical miles (97.95 km; 60.86 mi) southeast of Ocean City, Maryland, at 37°45.369′N 074°10.472′W.
Sawtooth	United States	During a trip from the Golovin Cold Storage Plant to Golovin in the Territory of Alaska, the 11-gross register ton, 41-foot (12.5 m) fishing vessel was wrecked near Caroline Island (64°33′N 163°02′W) in Golovnin Bay after her steering gear failed and she ran up on a beach. Both people on board survived.

=== 20 August ===
List of shipwrecks: 20 August 1936
Ship	State	Description
Motorboats and barges	Unknown	Spanish Civil War: The destroyer Almirante Miranda ( (Spain) Spanish Republican Navy) sank 20 motorboats and barges while bombarding Palma de Mallorca on Mallorca in the Balearic Islands.

=== 21 August ===
List of shipwrecks: 21 August 1936
Ship	State	Description
King Bleddyn	United Kingdom	The cargo ship ran aground on the Alacran Reef in the Gulf of Mexico. She was refloated on 24 August.

=== 22 August ===
List of shipwrecks: 22 August 1936
Ship	State	Description
Primus	Finland	The tug collided with Atlantis (United Kingdom) at Helsingfors. She capsized and sank with the loss of four crew.

=== 24 August ===
List of shipwrecks: 24 August 1936
Ship	State	Description
Antonis G. Lemos	Greece	The cargo ship collided with the destroyer leader HMS Keith (Royal Navy) in the English Channel 20 nautical miles (37 km) north of Alderney, Channel Islands (49°56′N 2°17′W). All crew were rescued by the destroyer HMS Brilliant (Royal Navy).
Janine	France	The dredger foundered off Cape D'Ambre, Madagascar, with the loss of all but two crew.
Snowflake	United Kingdom	The cargo ship struck a rock in the Bristol Channel off Hangman Point, Devon, England, and was holed. She was beached at Watermouth.

=== 26 August ===
List of shipwrecks: 26 August 1936
Ship	State	Description
T. H. Trahey	United States	The 494-ton, 130-foot (39.6 m) cargo barge was wrecked without loss of life on the Yukon River in the Territory of Alaska.

=== 27 August ===
List of shipwrecks: 27 August 1936
Ship	State	Description
Konstan	Spain	Spanish Civil War: The 1,857 GRT cargo ship on a passage from Bilbao to Gijon with iron ore was captured outside of Santander by the Nationalist battleship Alfonso XIII. The ship was ordered to go to El Ferrol accompanied by the Nationalist destroyer Velasco. Due to the age of the steamer, the convoy could only move very slowly and on their way, Velasco was repeatedly attacked by the Republican aircraft. Consequently, the steamer's crew was ordered to abandon ship, and the vessel was shelled and sunk by Velasco. The steamer's crew were interned in Ferrol but later were able to return to the Republican-controlled area.
Osprey	United States	The 12-gross register ton, 41-foot (12.5 m) seiner sank in San Alberto Bay (55°28′N 133°14′W) in the Alexander Archipelago between Prince of Wales Island and San Fernando Island (55.5141667°N 133.3569444°W) in Southeast Alaska after colliding with the motor vessel Leba (United States). All six people aboard abandoned ship in a boat and rowed to Leba.

=== 30 August ===
List of shipwrecks: 30 August 1936
Ship	State	Description
Tamaye Maru	Japan	The coaster was driven ashore and sank at Miyake Island.

== September ==
=== 1 September ===
List of shipwrecks: 1 September 1936
Ship	State	Description
Calla Milo	Spanish Navy	Spanish Civil War: The Nationalist training vessel was sunk by Republican aircraft.
Juan Mary	Spanish Navy	Spanish Civil War: The auxiliary patrol ship was lost on this date.

=== 2 September ===
List of shipwrecks: 2 September 1936
Ship	State	Description
Miyake Maru	Japan	The coaster sank in the Pacific Ocean off Miyake Island.

=== 3 September ===
List of shipwrecks: 3 September 1936
Ship	State	Description
Evelyn	United Kingdom	The 125-foot (38 m), 234.8-ton steam trawler was stranded on Skallarif Reef, Huna Floi, Iceland. She broke up in strong winds and heavy weather on or after 4 September.
Fuyang	Republic of China	The cargo ship foundered in the Yangtze 30 nautical miles (56 km) upstream of Ichang.
Jan Store	Sweden	The schooner ran ashore at Ristna Point, Estonia and was wrecked.

=== 4 September ===
List of shipwrecks: 4 September 1936
Ship	State	Description
Keishu Maru	Japan	The coaster sank in the Tsushima Strait south west of Fusan, Korea.

=== 6 September ===
List of shipwrecks: 6 September 1936
Ship	State	Description
Stella	Italy	The 4,265 GRT cargo ship caught fire at Rhodes, Greece, and was burnt out.
Trocadero	United Kingdom	The 125-foot (38 m), 244-ton steam trawler was wrecked on the southeast coast of Iceland, a total loss.

=== 8 September ===
List of shipwrecks: 8 September 1936
Ship	State	Description
NRP Afonso de Albuquerque	Portuguese Navy	1936 Naval Revolt: The Afonso de Albuquerque-class sloop was shelled by coast artillery and was beached in the Tagus with some loss of life. Refloated, repaired and returned to service.
Baltic	Netherlands	The auxiliary schooner ran aground off Ameland, Friesland. All crew were rescued.
NRP Dão	Portuguese Navy	1936 Naval Revolt: The Douro-class destroyer was shelled by coast artillery and was beached in the Tagus with some loss of life. Refloated, repaired and returned to service.
Sirenes	Norway	The cargo ship ran aground at Callantsoog, Netherlands. She was refloated on 22 September.

=== 9 September ===
List of shipwrecks: 9 September 1936
Ship	State	Description
Romance	United States	The 1,240-gross register ton cargo liner collided in fog with the cargo ship New York (United States) off the coast of Massachusetts in Outer Boston Harbor and sank without loss of life in up to 80 feet (24 m) of water 1 nautical mile (1.9 km; 1.2 mi) north of The Graves Light at 42°23′41″N 070°51′50″W.

=== 11 September ===
List of shipwrecks: 11 September 1936
Ship	State	Description
Nuevo Alvarez Feijóo	Spain	Spanish Civil War: The fishing trawler was shelled and sunk by C-4 (Spanish Navy).

=== 12 September ===
List of shipwrecks: 12 September 1936
Ship	State	Description
Jata Mendi	Spain	The 4,250 GRT cargo ship awaiting scrapping at Bilbao, was taken to Pasajes during the night and sunk there to block the entrance to the port. Later raised by the Nationalists and scrapped in August 1937.

=== 13 September ===
List of shipwrecks: 13 September 1936
Ship	State	Description
Frederick A	United States	While no one was aboard, the 12-gross register ton motor vessel dragged her anchor during a gale and was wrecked in Akutan Bay (54°08′05″N 165°46′20″W) on Akutan Island in the Aleutian Islands, about 2.5 nautical miles (4.6 km; 2.9 mi) east of the bay′s southern peninsula.
Unidentified boats		All boats on Lovatnet — a lake in Norway — were wrecked or sunk when a landslide near the lake′s southern end generated a megatsunami that ranged in size from 74 metres (243 ft) in the vicinity of the slide to 12.6 metres (41 ft) at the north end of the lake.

=== 14 September ===
List of shipwrecks: 14 September 1936
Ship	State	Description
Aldena	United States	During a voyage from Chicago, Illinois, to St. Paul, Minnesota, the 21-gross register ton motor yacht was destroyed on the Mississippi River at Guttenberg, Iowa, by a fire that began when her gasoline engine back-fired while she was anchored at the Guttenberg lock. Both members of her crew survived.
Bassa	United Kingdom	The cargo ship ran aground in the Sherboro River, Sierra Leone. She was refloated on 21 September.
Westport	United States	The 116-gross register ton, 88-foot (26.8 m) whaling steamer was wrecked without loss of life on a reef off Akutan Island in the Fox Islands group of the eastern Aleutian Islands during a gale. The cutter USCGC Daphne ( United States Coast Guard) rescued all 12 people aboard Westport.

=== 16 September ===
List of shipwrecks: 16 September 1936
Ship	State	Description
Pourquoi-Pas	France	The 449 GRT research vessel on a passage from Reykjavík to Copenhagen struck the rocks near Borgarfjörður, Iceland and sank with the loss of 39 of the 40 people on board.

=== 17 September ===
List of shipwrecks: 17 September 1936
Ship	State	Description
Avon River	United Kingdom	The cargo ship ran aground on Mansel Island, Northern Territory, Canada. She was abandoned as a total loss on 20 September. The crew were rescued by N. B. McLean (Canada).

=== 19 September ===
List of shipwrecks: 17 September 1936
Ship	State	Description
B-6	(Spain) Spanish Republican Navy	Spanish Civil War: The B-class submarine sank off Cabo de Peñas, Spain, after exchanging gunfire with and surrendering to the destroyer Velasco and armed tug (or armed trawler) Galicia (both Nationalist Spain), either due to damage inflicted by gunfire or because she was scuttled by her crew to prevent capture.
San Francesco M	Italy	The 230 GRT motor brigantine on a passage from Benghazi to Bardia with general cargo, ran aground near Bersis and was wrecked.

=== 21 September ===
List of shipwrecks: 21 September 1936
Ship	State	Description
Karanan	Netherlands	The coaster, on her maiden voyage ran aground at Blakeney, Norfolk, United Kingdom. She was refloated on 1 October.

=== 22 September ===
List of shipwrecks: 22 September 1936
Ship	State	Description
Onteora	United States	The cargo ship was burnt out at New York.
Rosaura	United Kingdom	The motor yacht was in collision with Henca (Netherlands) at Amsterdam, North Holland, Netherlands and was severely damaged. She was subsequently repaired and returned to service.

=== 23 September ===
List of shipwrecks: 23 September 1936
Ship	State	Description
E M Dalglas	Denmark	The cargo ship collided with Angelina Lauro (Italy) in the English Channel off Ouessant, France and was severely damaged.

=== 24 September ===
List of shipwrecks: 24 September 1936
Ship	State	Description
Arizona Maru	Japan	The cargo ship collided with Uyo Maru (Japan) at Yokohama and was consequently beached.

=== 25 September ===
List of shipwrecks: 25 September 1936
Ship	State	Description
Bandar Shahpour	United Kingdom	The cargo ship struck a rock in St. George's Channel off the Smalls Lighthouse. She was consequently beached at Dale, Pembrokeshire.
Madrid	Argentina	The 878 GRT coaster on a voyage from Buenos Aires to Asunción with general cargo, collided with Epaminondas C. Embiricos (Greece) at Ramallo and was beached. She sank the next day.

=== 29 September ===
List of shipwrecks: 29 September 1936
Ship	State	Description
Almirante Ferrándiz	(Spain) Spanish Republican Navy	Spanish Civil War: Battle of Cape Espartel: The Churruca-class destroyer was sunk by gunfire in the Strait of Gibraltar off Tarifa, Spain, by the heavy cruiser Canarias ( Nationalist Spain) with the loss of 104 crewmen killed. Thirty-one were rescued and made prisoners of war and 25 were rescued by the steamer Katoubia (France).
Xauen	(Spain) Spanish Republican Navy	Spanish Civil War: : Battle of Cape Espartel: The naval trawler was reported sunk by gunfire in the Strait of Gibraltar off Spain east of Europa Point by the heavy cruiser Canarias ( Nationalist Spain). According to one source, however, she remained afloat and escaped to Málaga.

== October ==
=== 2 October ===
List of shipwrecks: 2 October 1936
Ship	State	Description
Gaston	Nicaragua	The 847 GRT banana boat sank after an explosion while lying at anchor about 3 miles off Zamora, Mexico.
General Haig	United Kingdom	The auxiliary schooner was driven ashore at Curler, Labrador, Canada and was a total loss.

=== 4 October ===
List of shipwrecks: 4 October 1936
Ship	State	Description
Estonia	Finland	The barquentine ran aground on Örskär, Sweden and was wrecked. All crew survived.
Mabel A. Frye	United Kingdom	The four-masted schooner sprang a leak and was abandoned in the Atlantic Ocean (44°44′N 45°34′W). The crew were rescued by American Merchant (United States).
Tensei Maru	Japan	The 1,198 GRT cargo ship on a passage from Otaru to Shirahama in ballast, ran aground on the east coast of Sakhalin, Soviet Union. She was later refloated and taken in tow, but came ashore again on 23 October 1936.

=== 5 October ===
List of shipwrecks: 5 October 1936
Ship	State	Description
Hiawatha II	United Kingdom	The schooner sprang a leak in the Atlantic Ocean (45°35′N 57°05′W) and was abandoned. The crew were rescued by the trawler Viernoe (United Kingdom).
Holland	Netherlands	The coaster ran aground on the Moma Bar, 75 nautical miles (139 km) south of Angoche, Portuguese East Africa. She was refloated on 12 October.
Krestyanka	Soviet Union	The 419 GRT sealing motor schooner on a voyage from Petropavlovsk to Bering Sea with 22 crew and one passenger on board, encountered a strong gale and issued an S.O.S. Search efforts by both ships and aircraft failed to find the vessel. Presumed foundered and lost with all hands.

=== 7 October ===
List of shipwrecks: 7 October 1936
Ship	State	Description
Pocopson	United States	The 177-foot (53.9 m), 721-gross register ton schooner barge sank in 50 feet (15 m) of water in the North Atlantic Ocean off Neptune City, New Jersey, at 40°12.204′N 073°59.257′W. Her crew of three survived.

=== 8 October ===
List of shipwrecks: 8 October 1936
Ship	State	Description
Ohioan	United States	The 5,154 GRT cargo ship on a voyage from Boston to San Francisco with general cargo and trucks, ran aground on the rocks north of Seal Rocks in heavy fog and was wrecked. The crew was safely brought ashore by a rescue buoy. The ship was declared a total loss and sold for scrapping, but was never removed.

=== 9 October ===
List of shipwrecks: 9 October 1936
Ship	State	Description
I-5	Spanish Navy	Spanish Civil War: The I-1-class motor patrol boat was shelled and sunk in the Strait of Gibraltar by Almirante Cervera (Spanish Navy).
Uad Lucas	Spanish Navy	Spanish Civil War: The Uad Ras-class naval trawler was shelled and sunk at Málaga by Almirante Cervera (Spanish Navy).
Uad Muluya	Spanish Navy	Spanish Civil War: The Uad Ras-class naval trawler was shelled and sunk at Málaga by Almirante Cervera (Spanish Navy).

=== 11 October ===
List of shipwrecks: 11 October 1936
Ship	State	Description
Cara	United Kingdom	The cargo ship struck rocks off Kyleakin, Isle of Skye and was consequently beached. She was refloated on 19 October and subsequently repaired.

=== 12 October ===
List of shipwrecks: 12 October 1936
Ship	State	Description
B 4	Spanish Navy	Spanish Civil War: The B-class submarine was bombed and sunk (or just damaged) in Málaga Harbour. Raised soon after but never repaired.

=== 14 October ===
List of shipwrecks: 14 October 1936
Ship	State	Description
Panaghis	Greece	The cargo ship ran aground at Gallipoli, Turkey. She was refloated by 23 October.

=== 15 October ===
List of shipwrecks: 15 October 1936
Ship	State	Description
Moko Maru	Japan	The cargo ship foundered in the South China Sea. All crew were rescued by Concordia (Norway).
Olympic	United States	With no one on board, the 12-gross register ton motor vessel dragged her anchor and was blown ashore and wrecked in the harbor at Sitka, Territory of Alaska.

=== 16 October ===
List of shipwrecks: 16 October 1936
Ship	State	Description
Fernando Poo	(Spain) Second Spanish Republic	Spanish Civil War: During a voyage from Barcelona, Spain, to Spanish colonies in Africa carrying mail, the unarmed Republican merchant ship was sunk by gunfire by the auxiliary cruiser Cuidad de Mahón ( Nationalist Spain) in the Bight of Biafra off Bata, Río Muni, with the loss of 40 lives after refusing to surrender.

=== 17 October ===
List of shipwrecks: 17 October 1936
Ship	State	Description
Sand Merchant	United Kingdom	The 1,981 GRT dredger on a voyage from Pelee Island to Cleveland with a cargo of sand, capsized and sank in Lake Erie 16 nautical miles (30 km) north west of Cleveland, Ohio, United States with the loss of twenty crew.
Shuna	United Kingdom	The 1,494 GRT cargo ship on a passage from Clyde to Gothenburg with general cargo and coal, ran aground near Ardmore Point, Islay, Outer Hebrides. She subsequently broke in two and was abandoned as a total loss.

=== 18 October ===
List of shipwrecks: 18 October 1936
Ship	State	Description
Hilda	Finland	The three-masted schooner ran aground at Signildskar and was wrecked.
St. Joseph	Norway	The cargo ship ran aground on the Grey Rocks, Sound of Mull. She was refloated on 12 November.

=== 19 October ===
List of shipwrecks: 19 October 1936
Ship	State	Description
Lois A. Conrad	United Kingdom	The schooner foundered in the Atlantic Ocean 19 nautical miles (35 km) off North Sydney, Nova Scotia, Canada. All crew were rescued by Haligonian (United Kingdom).

=== 20 October ===
List of shipwrecks: 20 October 1936
Ship	State	Description
Okeanis	Greece	The cargo ship was abandoned in the North Sea 50 nautical miles (93 km) off IJmuiden, North Holland, Netherlands. The crew were rescued by Belgion (Greece). Okeanis was later towed into IJmuiden by Witte Zee (Netherlands).
Van der Wijck	Netherlands	The 2,633 GRT cargo-passenger ship on a voyage from Sourabaya to Samarang, capsized and sank in the Java Sea near Tandjong Pakis with some loss of life amongst the 226 people on board. Thirty-four people were reported missing.

=== 22 October ===
List of shipwrecks: 22 October 1936
Ship	State	Description
Birmania	Italy	The cargo ship ran aground in the Brazzinaga Canal near Split, Yugoslavia and broke in two. She was declared a total loss. She was refloated on 27 October.
Manyo Maru	Japan	The cargo ship foundered in Ishikari Bay off Otaru, Hokkaidō. The crew were rescued.
Oura Maru	Japan	The 672 GRT salvage vessel on a passage from Sakisawa, Karafuto Prefecture to Hakodate, foundered in the Sea of Japan west of Hokkaidō.
Soshu Maru	Japan	The cargo ship was driven ashore on the west coast of Hokkaidō after her tow parted.

=== 24 October ===
List of shipwrecks: 24 October 1936
Ship	State	Description
Albion	Netherlands	The coaster foundered in The Wash. All crew were rescued by Dewsbury (United Kingdom).
Asdang	Thailand	The 640 GRT coaster while on a passage to Singapore, came ashore at Kemaman, Malaya and was a total loss.

=== 25 October ===
List of shipwrecks: 25 October 1936
Ship	State	Description
Cristóbal Colón	Spain	The ocean liner ran aground on a reef 5 nautical miles (9.3 km) north of Bermuda. Salvage efforts were abandoned on 6 November and she was declared a total loss.
Elanchove	Spain	The cargo ship foundered with the loss of thirty nine crew members and two accompanying family member. Only one crewmember survived. She was on a voyage from Bilbao to Cardiff, Glamorgan, United Kingdom.
Nanna	Finland	The 471 GRT coaster on a passage from Tallinn to Gdynia with a cargo of scrap iron, sank in the Baltic Sea off Odensholm, Estonia. All crew survived.

=== 26 October ===
List of shipwrecks: 26 October 1936
Ship	State	Description
Abdel Lateef Loutfi	Egypt	The 209 GRT coaster on a passage from Alexandria to Mersa Matrouh with general cargo, sank in the Mediterranean Sea 3 nautical miles (5.6 km) off Alexandria.
Danella	United Kingdom	The 197 GRT Fleetwood trawler ran aground at Deerness, Orkney Islands in 70 mph (112.7 km/h) winds. Refloated on 15 November, but sold for scrapping.
Donsam	flag unknown	The cargo ship sank in the Paraná River.
Helēna Faulbaums	Latvia	The 1,951 GRT cargo ship on a passage from Liverpool to Blyth in ballast, foundered in the Atlantic Ocean (56°14′N 5°55′W) at Belnahua reef near Oban, Scotland with the loss of fifteen of her nineteen crew, of which 7 were buried in Cullipool Cemetery.
Osaka Maru	Japan	The 1,470 GRT cargo ship on a voyage from Korea to Yokohama with a cargo of ore, foundered in the Pacific Ocean off Shiomisaki.
Ostsee	Germany	The 1,307 GRT cargo ship on a passage from Lubeck to Uleaborg with a cargo of potash ran aground at Marjaniemi, Oulu, Finland. She subsequently broke in two and was a total loss.
Una	Brazil	The 1,036 GRT cargo ship on a passage from Rio Grande to Santos with general cargo, sank in the Atlantic Ocean 80 nautical miles (150 km) south of Florianópolis. The crew were rescued.

=== 27 October ===
List of shipwrecks: 27 October 1936
Ship	State	Description
Bona	Sweden	The 303 GRT coaster on a passage from Västervik to Portmadoc with a cargo of wood, ran aground and was wrecked off Karlskrona.
Elbe I	Germany	The lightship foundered in the North Sea with the loss of all fifteen crew.
Hedstrommen	Sweden	The 452 GRT coaster on a passage from Strömstad to London with a cargo of stone, sprang a leak and sank in the North Sea. The crew were rescued by two fishing vessels.
Vestkyst I	Norway	The coaster collided with Galtesund (Norway) at Arendal, Norway and sank with the loss of two crew members.

=== 28 October ===
List of shipwrecks: 28 October 1936
Ship	State	Description
Starmount	United Kingdom	The cargo ship ran aground in the Saint Lawrence River at Brockville, Ontario, Canada. She was refloated on 31 October.

=== 29 October ===
List of shipwrecks: 29 October 1936
Ship	State	Description
Agnes Ann	United States	While towing logs, the 8-gross register ton, 31.1-foot (9.5 m) fishing vessel was destroyed in Behm Canal off Escape Point (55°39′N 131°43′W) in Southeast Alaska by a fire than began in her engine room.

=== 30 October ===
List of shipwrecks: 30 October 1936
Ship	State	Description
Marinero Cante	Spanish Navy	Spanish Civil War: The Condestable Zaragoza-class fisheries protection vessel was scuttled at Rosas to prevent capture by Nationalists, or shelled and sunk by Canarias (Spanish Navy).
Myconos	Greece	The 1,802 GRT cargo ship on a voyage from Rotterdam to Syra with a cargo of coal, collided with another vessel in the Bay of Biscay and was beached at Ouessant, Finistère, France. She was declared a total loss.
Stranna	Norway	The 1,546 GRT cargo ship departed the Clyde for Halifax on 24 October with a cargo of coal. Last spoken to on 30 October. Not since heard of, presumed foundered with the loss of all hands.

=== Unknown ===
List of shipwrecks: unknown October 1936
Ship	State	Description
B-5	Spanish Navy	Spanish Civil War: The B-class submarine disappeared in the Mediterranean Sea after departing Málaga. Hypothesies for the cause of her loss include that she was sunk by a Nationalist seaplane in the Strait of Gibraltar sometime beteeen 12 and 15 October and that she was sabotaged by her commanding officer on 16 October.

== November ==
=== 1 November ===
List of shipwrecks: 1 November 1936
Ship	State	Description
Bessemer City	United States	The 5,686 GRT cargo ship on a passage from New Westminster to London with general cargo, was wrecked at Clodgy Point, St. Ives, Cornwall. All 33 crew were rescued by the St. Ives Lifeboat. The cargo was salvaged by local people after washing up on nearby beaches.

=== 2 November ===
List of shipwrecks: 2 November 1936
Ship	State	Description
Allenstein	Germany	The cargo ship ran aground at Östergarn, Sweden. She was refloated on 6 November.

=== 3 November ===
List of shipwrecks: 3 November 1936
Ship	State	Description
Carl Vinnen	Germany	The cargo ship ran aground on Middelgrunden, Øresund. She was refloated on 6 November.
Trione	Sweden	The cargo ship ran aground at Ilhéus, Brazil. She was refloated on 12 November.

=== 8 November ===
List of shipwrecks: 8 November 1936
Ship	State	Description
Dignitas	Italy	The 5,376 GRT cargo ship on a voyage from Bizerta for IJmuiden with a cargo of iron ore, passed Ushant on 8 November and was due to arrive 11 November; no further trace and supposed foundered in the English Channel in stormy weather.
Isis	Germany	The 4,454 GRT passenger-cargo ship on a voyage from Hamburg to New York foundered in the Atlantic Ocean 200 nautical miles (370 km) west of Land's End, Cornwall, United Kingdom. The only survivor was rescued by Westernland (Germany).
J. Oswald Boyd	United States	The 1,806 GRT tanker travelling with a cargo of gasoline, ran aground on Simmons Reef, Lake Michigan and was wrecked. She was destroyed in an explosion and fire on 2 January 1937.

=== 10 November ===
List of shipwrecks: 10 November 1936
Ship	State	Description
Enterprise	United Kingdom	The 211 GRT coaster was burnt out at St. Peter's, Nova Scotia, Canada.
Garibaldi	Denmark	The auxiliary three-masted schooner came ashore near the Lungö Lighthouse, Sweden. She was refloated on 13 November and found to be severely damaged.

=== 11 November ===
List of shipwrecks: 11 November 1936
Ship	State	Description
Manuel	Spain	Spanish Civil War: The 976 GRT coaster on passage from Marseille to Tarragona with a cargo of groceries, and potentially contraband war materiel for the Republicans, was shelled and sunk in the Gulf of Roses by Canarias (Spanish Navy). Out of 21 crew, 16 were killed.
Nor	Norway	The coaster ran aground on Bulholmen, Folda, Nord-Trøndelag, Norway, and sank.

=== 12 November ===
List of shipwrecks: 12 November 1936
Ship	State	Description
Alisada	United Kingdom	The 177 GRT auxiliary schooner on a passage from Nassau to Inagua caught fire at Long Cay, Bahamas and was destroyed.
Pine	United Kingdom	The coaster was hit by Olive (United Kingdom in Carlingford Lough and sank. All eight cre were rescued by Olive.

=== 14 November ===
List of shipwrecks: 14 November 1936
Ship	State	Description
Welsh City	United Kingdom	The cargo ship ran aground on Saltholm, Øresund. She was refloated on 21 November.

=== 16 November ===
List of shipwrecks: 16 November 1936
Ship	State	Description
Sture	Sweden	The 301 GRT coaster on a passage from Slottsbron to Gothenburg with a cargo of wood pulp, sank in Vänern.

=== 18 November ===
List of shipwrecks: 18 November 1936
Ship	State	Description
Kildalkey	United Kingdom	The 624 GRT whaler ran aground in Saldanha Bay. She was declared a total loss on 3 December.
Ste Catherine	Haiti	The sailing vessel sank in the Caribbean Sea off Petite-Rivière-de-Nippes.
Yewbank	United Kingdom	The coaster came ashore at Horsey, Norfolk. All ten crew were rescued. She was refloated on 27 November.

=== 20 November ===
List of shipwrecks: 20 November 1936
Ship	State	Description
Chesley R	United Kingdom	The schooner ran aground at Argentia, Newfoundland. She was refloated on 28 December.
U-18	Kriegsmarine	The Type IIB submarine collided with another vessel in the Bight of Lübeck and sank with the loss of eight of her twenty crew. Subsequently raised, repaired and returned to service.

=== 21 November ===
List of shipwrecks: 21 November 1936
Ship	State	Description
Hibou	United Kingdom	The 559 GRT coaster on a passage from Owen Sound to Manitowaning with general cargo, foundered in Georgian Bay 4 nautical miles (7.4 km) north of Owen Sound, Ontario, Canada with the loss of seven of her seventeen crew.

=== 22 November ===
List of shipwrecks: 22 November 1936
Ship	State	Description
Colwith Force	United Kingdom	The coaster sprang a leak in the English Channel 17 nautical miles (31 km) south south east of The Lizard, Cornwall and was abandoned. All crew were rescued by Marina (Norway). Colwith Force was towed into Falmouth, Cornwall by Flying Irishman (Netherlands).
Schelde	Netherlands	The 300 GRT coaster on a passage from Porsgrunn to Jersey with a cargo of timber, ran aground on the Paternosters, 5 nautical miles (9.3 km) north of Jersey, Channel Islands. All crew survived.

=== 23 November ===
List of shipwrecks: 23 November 1936
Ship	State	Description
Fiona	United Kingdom	The tanker ran aground at Suva, Fiji. She was refloated on 23 November.

=== 24 November ===
List of shipwrecks: 24 November 1936
Ship	State	Description
Ceres	United Kingdom	The ketch sank at anchor at Baggy Point, Devon. She was launched at Salcombe, Devon in 1811.
Sibiryakoff	Soviet Union	The icebreaker struck a rock in the Kara Sea and stuck fast. She was subsequently abandoned in late December. All crew were rescued by Lenin (Soviet Union).
Thomas Hardy	United Kingdom	The 336 GRT steam trawler ran aground on the rocks at Brimness Point, 5 miles west of Tranøy Lighthouse, Norway shortly after leaving Lødingen and was wrecked.

=== 25 November ===
List of shipwrecks: 25 November 1936
Ship	State	Description
Erinoula	Greece	The cargo ship struck a submerged wreck at Bender Eregli, Turkey and was beached. She was refloated on 7 February 1937.
Fred W. Green	United States	The cargo ship collided with a pier at Muskegon, Michigan and sank.
Izmir	Turkey	The cargo ship was driven ashore at Bender Eregli in a storm. She was refloated on 1 December.

=== 27 November ===
List of shipwrecks: 27 November 1936
Ship	State	Description
Ally	Denmark	The coaster collided with Tempo (Denmark) off Aarhus (56°00′N 10°57′E) and sank.

=== 29 November ===
List of shipwrecks: 29 November 1936
Ship	State	Description
Angeliki	Greece	The 3,240 GRT cargo ship on a voyage from Mariupol to Rouen with a cargo of coal, ran aground off St. Nazaire and was wrecked. Later refloated and broken up in Belgium.

=== 30 November ===
List of shipwrecks: 30 November 1936
Ship	State	Description
Indra	Latvia	The 179 GRT coaster left Riga for Helsinki on 28 November with a cargo of grain. Left Jelgava on 30 November, and not since heard of. Presumed foundered in the Gulf of Riga with the loss of all hands.
Watco	United Kingdom	The 342 GRT coaster on a passage from Sydney to St. Pierre with a cargo of coal, was abandoned in sinking condition in the Atlantic Ocean south of Miquelon. All crew were rescued, the ship drifted ashore and was declared a total loss.

=== Unknown date ===
List of shipwrecks: Unknown date 1936
Ship	State	Description
I-5	Spanish Navy	Spanish Civil War: The I-1-class motor patrol boat was shelled and sunk in the Strait of Gibraltar by Almirante Cervera (Spanish Navy) on either 6 October or 1 November 1936.
Morris Ville	flag unknown	The schooner capsized in Bonne Bay.

== December ==
=== 1 December ===
List of shipwrecks: 1 December 1936
Ship	State	Description
Elsa	Germany	The 849 GRT collier on a passage from Danzig to Cherbourg with a cargo of coal, foundered in the North Sea off Borkum, Germany with the loss of twelve of her fourteen crew.
Tozeur	France	The 2,110 GRT cargo ship on a voyage from Port-Saint-Louis-du-Rhône to Marseille in ballast, ran aground on Île Ratennau, off the south coast of France and sank.

=== 3 December ===
List of shipwrecks: 3 December 1936
Ship	State	Description
Aghios Spyridon	Greece	The 1,476 GRT cargo ship on a passage from Braila to Candia with a cargo of wheat and timber, struck a submerged wreck at Bender Eregli, Turkey and sank. All crew survived.

=== 4 December ===
List of shipwrecks: 4 December 1936
Ship	State	Description
Bodia	Finland	The 1,814 GRT cargo ship on a passage from Ostend to Narvik in ballast, ran aground near Aalesund and was wrecked with some loss of life.
Dinas	United Kingdom	The 117.5-foot (35.8 m), 219-ton steam trawler was wrecked at Dunfanaghy, County Donegal, Ireland, a total loss.
Kodama	United Kingdom	The 125.5-foot (38.3 m), 257-ton steam trawler sank off the Western Isles of Scotland. Lost with all hands.

=== 6 December ===
List of shipwrecks: 6 December 1936
Ship	State	Description
Burlington	United States	The cargo ship ran aground at Cleveland, Ohio and was a total loss.

=== 7 December ===
List of shipwrecks: 7 December 1936
Ship	State	Description
Bury Hill	United Kingdom	The 4,542 GRT cargo ship on a passage from Bunbury to UK with a cargo of wheat, ran aground on the Almadi Reef off Dakar, French West Africa and was wrecked.
Gulnes	Norway	Spanish Civil War: The 1,196 GRT cargo ship arrived from Manchester to load minerals, when she was bombed and damaged by the Republican aircraft at Seville, Spain. Towed to Gibraltar in January 1937, where she was condemned. Sold to Italian shipbreakers in March of the same year, finally broken up in Vado Ligure, Italy, in May 1937.

=== 9 December ===
List of shipwrecks: 9 December 1936
Ship	State	Description
Caring	Sweden	The cargo ship collided with Neptun (Germany) and was beached at Dragør, Denmark. She was later refloated but was severely damaged.
Kamo	Soviet Union	The 3,778 GRT passenger-cargo ship on a return voyage from eastern coast of Kamchatka to Petropavlovsk with a cargo of furs and passengers, ran aground in snowy weather on the rocks off Karaginsky Island due to navigational error and subsequently broke in two. The crew and passengers safely reached the land, and were taken off by Sakhalin on 26–28 December and taken back to Petropavlovsk. All 107 people on board survived.

=== 11 December ===
List of shipwrecks: 11 December 1936
Ship	State	Description
Kings County	Norway	The 5,268 GRT cargo ship on a voyage from Montreal to Antwerp with a cargo of grain, ran aground in stormy weather near Negro Head, Lorneville and eventually sank.

=== 12 December ===
List of shipwrecks: 12 December 1936
Ship	State	Description
C-3	Spanish Navy	Spanish Civil War, Operation Ursula: The C-class submarine was torpedoed and sunk in the Mediterranean Sea south east of Málaga (36°40′N 04°21′W) by U-34 (Kriegsmarine) with the loss of 39 crewmen. Two crewmen and a civilian pilot survived. The wreck was located in October 1998.
Vorma	Norway	The 1,192 GRT cargo ship left Goole for Sundsvall on 12 December with a cargo of coal. Not since heard of, presumed foundered in the North Sea.

=== 14 December ===
List of shipwrecks: 14 December 1936
Ship	State	Description
Komsomol	Soviet Union	Spanish Civil War: The 5,109 GRT cargo ship on a voyage from Poti to Ghent with a cargo of ore, was sunk by gunfire in the Mediterranean Sea by the Nationalist heavy cruiser Canarias (Spanish Navy).
Sigrid	Denmark	The cargo ship ran aground at Fiskars, Finland. She was refloated on 25 December but was severely damaged.

=== 16 December ===
List of shipwrecks: 16 December 1936
Ship	State	Description
Clara	United States	The 12-gross register ton motor vessel was wrecked by an explosion while on the beach in winter drydock in Monti Bay (59°34′N 139°50′W) at Yakutat, Territory of Alaska.

=== 18 December ===
List of shipwrecks: 18 December 1936
Ship	State	Description
Amager	Denmark	The auxiliary sailing ship foundered in the Baltic Sea 2 nautical miles (3.7 km) north of Nida, Lithuania. All crew were rescued.
Bore VII	Finland	The 1,080 GRT cargo ship on a passage from Abo to Kotka in ballast, ran aground at Manninklub, south of Kotka. Although declared a total loss, she was later salvaged and repaired.

=== 19 December ===
List of shipwrecks: 19 December 1936
Ship	State	Description
Turquoise	Belgium	The coaster collided with Sun X (United Kingdom) in the River Thames at Tilbury, Essex and was beached.

=== 22 December ===
List of shipwrecks: 22 December 1936
Ship	State	Description
Avondon	United Kingdom	The 205 GRT steam trawler ran aground near Leith and was wrecked.

=== 23 December ===
List of shipwrecks: 23 December 1936
Ship	State	Description
Georgios Karavias	Greece	The coaster ran aground at Kalamaki. She was refloated on 28 December.
Cesare Battisti	Italy	The 8,331 GRT steamship carrying 200 civilian passengers and 500 military personnel had her boiler exploded as she was entering Massawa harbor, killing 26 and injuring 100. She subsequently sank in shallow water, but was later raised and refloated in 1938.
Tac	Germany	The coaster collided with Anna Rehder (Germany) in the North Sea off Cuxhaven, Germany and consequently sank.

=== 24 December ===
List of shipwrecks: 24 December 1936
Ship	State	Description
Maimyo	United Kingdom	The 5,819 GRT cargo liner on a voyage from Calcutta to London with general cargo, ran aground on the Komuriya Ridge, off the east coast of Ceylon and was wrecked.
Pretoria	Germany	The ocean liner, on her maiden voyage, ran aground in the Solent. She was refloated on 27 December.

=== 25 December ===
List of shipwrecks: 25 December 1936
Ship	State	Description
Sensal	Germany	The 546 GRT coaster left Königsberg for Brake on 25 December with a cargo of grain, last sighted off Pillau on the same day. Not since heard of, presumed foundered in the Baltic Sea.

=== 26 December ===
List of shipwrecks: 26 December 1936
Ship	State	Description
Mount Dirfys	Greece	The 5,242 GRT cargo ship on a voyage from Koilthotlam, India to Wilmington with a cargo of chrome ore, ran aground on the Frying Pan Shoals, North Carolina, United States and was abandoned as unsalvable.

=== 27 December ===
List of shipwrecks: 27 December 1936
Ship	State	Description
Argentina	Greece	The 4,248 GRT cargo ship on a voyage from Rosario to Sharpness with a cargo of maize and wheat, ran aground in the River Severn at Sharpness, Gloucestershire, United Kingdom and was abandoned by her owners. About half of her cargo was discharged in situ during January 1937, allowing the ship to be refloated on 10 February 1937. Argentina was towed into Sharpness dock where the remainder of her cargo was discharged. However, she was too badly damaged to be worth repairing, and was subsequently towed to Newport to be broken up.
Dredge No.2	United States	The dredger sank in the San Juan River 150 nautical miles (280 km) north of Buenaventura, Colombia.

=== 30 December ===
List of shipwrecks: 30 December 1936
Ship	State	Description
Diamond	United Kingdom	The coaster collided with Heranger (Norway) in the River Thames at Greenhithe, Kent and sank with the loss of two of her seven crew.

=== 31 December ===
List of shipwrecks: 31 December 1936
Ship	State	Description
C-5	Spanish Navy	Spanish Civil War: The C-class submarine left Bilbao, Spain, and vanished. On 1 January 1937, fishing vessels discovered an oil slick approximately 11 nautical miles (20 km; 13 mi) north of Ribadesella, Spain. She might have sunk in a diving accident.

== Unknown date ==
List of shipwrecks: Unknown date 1936
Ship	State	Description
Chacon	United States	The 80-foot (24.4 m) mail and passenger vessel was stranded on a rock and then sank in Zimovia Strait in the Alexander Archipelago in Southeast Alaska. All 14 people aboard – eight passengers and her crew of six – were rescued from a lifeboat.
City of Taunton	United States	The 292-foot (89 m) cargo ship, a sidewheel paddle steamer, was beached and abandoned at Somerset, Massachusetts, on the west bank of the Taunton River at 41°42′39″N 071°10′33″W, just south of the future site of the Charles M. Braga Jr. Memorial Bridge, sometime during the 1930s. The wreck settled on the river bottom in very shallow water.
Conde del Venadito	Spanish Navy	The decommissioned Velasco-class cruiser was sunk as a target.
Daneland	United Kingdom	The 133.3-foot (40.6 m), 289.3-ton trawler went ashore at Tobermory for a fortnight, probably in December. Refloated and arrived at Fleetwood on 5 January 1937.
F. C. Pendleton	United States	The 145-foot (44 m), 408-gross register ton three-masted schooner burned and sank without loss of life in up to 45 feet (14 m) of water at 44°19′38″N 068°54′27″W while at anchor in Seal Harbor at Islesboro, Maine, sometime during the 1930s.
Gardner G. Deering	United States	The 251-foot (77 m), 1,982-gross register ton five-masted schooner was abandoned and later burned in Smith Cove off West Brooksville, Maine, sometime during the 1930s. Her wreck settled in 10 to 30 feet (3.0 to 9.1 m) of water approximately 500 feet (150 m) off the north shore of the cove at 44°22′55″N 068°46′30″W.
Hai-Kan No. 6	Imperial Japanese Navy	The decommissioned Kasuga-class armored cruiser (ex-Nisshin) was sunk as a target at the Kamegakubi Naval Proving Ground in the Inland Sea off Kure, Japan. She later was refloated and sunk again as a target ship in January 1942.
Hyak	United States	The vessel was wrecked on rocks off Kinklik, Territory of Alaska (60°50′55″N 147°37′30″W).
Hesper	United States	The 210-foot (64 m), 1,348-gross register ton four-masted schooner was abandoned at a wharf in the Sheepscot River at Wiscasset, Maine, upon the death of her owner sometime during 1936 and subsequently deteriorated into a wreck. The wreck was removed in 1998.
Luther Little	United States	The 210-foot (64 m), 1,234-gross register ton four-masted schooner was abandoned at a wharf in the Sheepscot River at Wiscasset, Maine, upon the death of her owner sometime during 1936 and subsequently deteriorated into a wreck. The wreck was removed in 1998.
Palo Alto	United States	The out of service concrete hulled tanker had been run aground and converted into an entertainment facility connected to shore by a dock in Seacliff State Beach, Aptos, California. Sometime in 1936 a storm cracked her hull across midship. Stripped and used as a fishing pier.
