= Bessemer City =

Bessemer City may refer to:-

- Bessemer City, North Carolina
- SS Bessemer City, a ship wrecked near St. Ives, Cornwall in 1936.
