= HMS Cowslip (K196) =

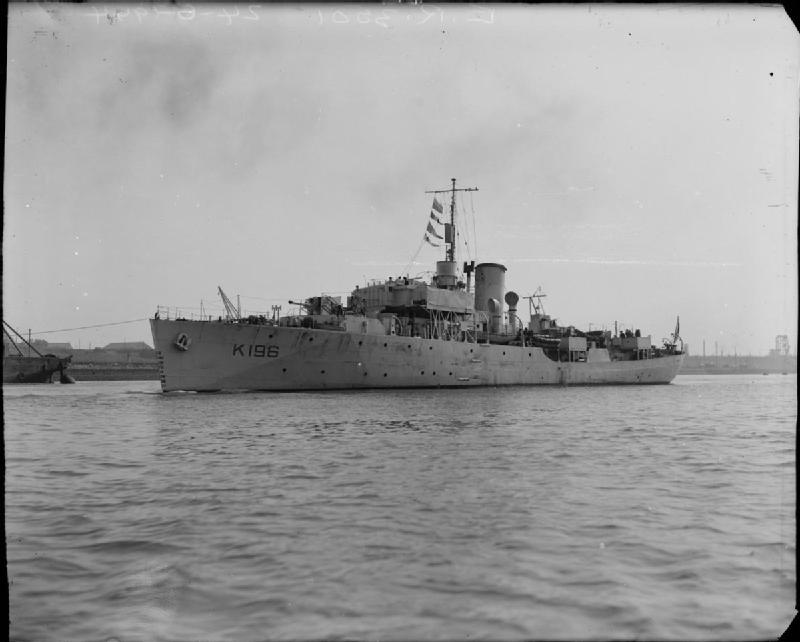
HMS Cowslip, underway, being towed in the Second World War

HMS Cowslip (K196) was a Flower-class corvette that served in the Royal Navy during the Second World War. The ship spent much of the war in convoy escort and anti-submarine duties during the Battle of the Atlantic.

== Construction ==
The ship was ordered 8 April 1940, laid down 16 January 1941, and built by Harland & Wolff in Belfast. She was launched 28 May 1941 and commissioned 9 August 1941.

== Career ==
On 29 October 1942, Cowslip rescued 50 survivors from the refrigerated cargo ship Corinaldo. The next day, Cowslip and the Norwegian cargo ship Alaska rescued 85 survivors from the troopship Président Doumer, which had been sunk by U-604.

On 30 September 1942, she rescued 50 survivors from the water from the sunken Empire Avocet.

Cowslip was sold in July 1948, and scrapped at Troon in April 1949.
