= SS Cotati =

American steam cargo ship

History

United States
- Name: Cotati (1919–42); Empire Avocet (1942)
- Namesake: Rancho Cotati
- Owner: USSB (1919–37); Maritime Commission (1937–41); Ministry of War Transport (1942)
- Operator: McCormick & McPherson (1919); International Freighting Corporation (1920–1921); New Zealand Shipping Co. (1941–1942)
- Port of registry: San Francisco (1919–42); London (1942)
- Ordered: 31 December 1917
- Builder: Moore Shipbuilding Co., Oakland
- Yard number: 133
- Laid down: 12 October 1918
- Launched: 30 March 1919
- Sponsored by: Mrs. George T. Page
- Commissioned: 26 August 1919
- Maiden voyage: 5 September 1919
- Identification: US Official Number 218780; UK Official Number 168289; Code Letters LSMC (1919–33); Code Letters KJGQ (1933–42); Code Letters GQYD (1942)
- Fate: Sunk, 30 September 1942

General characteristics
- Type: Design 1015 cargo ship
- Tonnage: 5,963 GRT; 4,385 NRT; 8,409 DWT
- Length: 402.5 ft (122.68 m)
- Beam: 53.0 ft (16.15 m)
- Depth: 32.0 ft (9.75 m)
- Installed power: 2,800 shp
- Propulsion: 2 x W. & A. Fletcher Co. steam turbines, double reduction geared to one screw
- Speed: 11 knots (20 km/h)
- Complement: 51 plus 7 DEMS gunners (Empire Avocet)

Cotati was a steam cargo ship built in 1918–1919 by Moore Shipbuilding and Drydock Company of Oakland for the United States Shipping Board (USSB) as part of the wartime shipbuilding program of the Emergency Fleet Corporation (EFC) to restore the nation's Merchant Marine. The vessel was briefly used for the first two years of her career to transport frozen meat between North and South America and Europe. The ship was subsequently laid up at the end of 1921 and remained part of the Reserve Fleet through the end of 1940. In January 1941 she was sold together with two other vessels to the New Zealand Shipping Co. and subsequently in 1942 was transferred to the Ministry of War Transport (MoWT) and renamed Empire Avocet. The ship was torpedoed and sunk by German submarine U-125 on 30 September 1942 on one of her regular wartime trips.

== Design and construction ==
After the United States entry into World War I, a large shipbuilding program was undertaken to restore and enhance shipping capabilities both of the United States and their Allies. As part of this program, EFC placed orders with nation's shipyards for a large number of vessels of standard designs. Design 1015 cargo ship was a standard cargo freighter of approximately 9,400 tons deadweight designed by Moore Shipbuilding Co. and adopted by USSB.

Cotati was part of the second order for 10 additional vessels placed by USSB with Moore Shipbuilding Co. on 31 December 1917. Cotati was the fifth of these vessels and was laid down at the shipbuilder's yard on 12 October 1918, and launched on 30 March 1919 (yard number 133), with Mrs. Georgie Page (née Hammond), wife of George T. Page, owner of the Rancho Cotati, being the sponsor. The vessel was named after the Cotati ranch.

The ship was shelter-deck type, had two main decks and was built on the Isherwood principle of longitudinal framing providing extra strength to the body of the vessel. The freighter had four main holds and also possessed all the modern machinery for quick loading and unloading of cargo from five large hatches, including ten winches and a large number of derricks. She was also equipped with wireless apparatus, had submarine signal system installed and had electrical lights installed along the decks. In addition, Cotati was equipped with carbonic anhydride refrigerating system built by York Manufacturing Co., which was capable of providing 307,855 cubic feet (8,717.5 m^{3}) of refrigerated space in eight chambers.

As built, the ship was 402.5 feet (122.7 m) long (between perpendiculars) and 53.0 feet (16.2 m) abeam, a depth of 32.0 feet (9.8 m). Cotati was originally assessed at 5,963 GRT and 4,385 NRT and had deadweight of approximately 8,409. The vessel had a steel hull with double bottom throughout with exception of her machine compartment, and a single turbine rated at 2,800 shp, double-reduction geared to a single screw propeller that moved the ship at up to 11 knots (13 mph; 20 km/h). The steam for the engine was supplied by three Scotch marine boilers fitted for oil fuel.

After successful completion of sea trials, the vessel was transferred to her owners on 26 August 1919 and immediately commissioned into service.

== Operational history ==
As the ship was nearing her completion, she was assigned to McCormick & McPherson for one trip to carry flour to the East Coast of the United States or Europe. Following an established USSB policy the Shipping Board ship could only continue with cargo to Europe if an equivalent amount of cargo space would be allocated by a foreign shipping operator, so Cotati were to discharge her cargo in one of the East Coast ports. After acceptance, the vessel loaded 7,800 tons of flour in San Francisco and departed on 5 September 1919 bound for Norfolk and New York. Cotati passed through the Panama Canal on 21 September and reached her destination on 30 September, successfully completing her maiden voyage. The ship remained idle in New York until early December when she was chartered for one trip to carry food supplies to Germany. Cotati proceeded to load over 4,000 tons of fresh beef and pork in Boston before sailing out on New Year's Day 1920 bound for Rotterdam and Hamburg. The vessel reached Rotterdam on 15 January, and returned to Wilmington on 17 March to unload her part cargo of kainite. Cotati then was assigned to International Freighting Corporation and sailed to Philadelphia for loading a week later. The freighter cleared out from Philadelphia on her first trip under new management on 21 April carrying general merchandise to South American ports of Buenos Aires, Rio de Janeiro and Montevideo. On her return trip she became disabled while northwest of Bermuda and had to be taken into tow by tug Butterfield who safely brought her into New York on 24 September 1920.

Cotati departed Philadelphia on her next trip to South America on 15 December. On 18 December she picked up a distress call from Boston-based schooner Jane Palmer on her voyage from Newport News to Buenos Aires with a cargo of bituminous coal. The schooner ran into a strong gale approximately 500 nautical miles (930 km) east of Cape Hatteras and developed a strong leak. Cotati stood by during the night as it was impossible to come close in due to raging storm. As the pumps could not cope with rising waters, the crew hastily abandoned the sinking schooner in one lifeboat and started rowing towards the steamer. As they reached Cotati, their lifeboat capsized but the entire crew was saved and taken aboard of Cotati. The freighter then proceeded towards Bermuda where they landed the schooner's crew on 20 December.

The freighter then continued on to Brazil and Argentina, arriving at Rio de Janeiro on 6 January 1921. After unloading the cargo, the vessel loaded frozen beef and sailed for London reaching it on 13 March. Cotati then returned to South America one more time in April loading another full cargo of frozen beef and departed Buenos Aires for London on 26 May. After unloading her cargo, the ship departed from England at the end of July and arrived at Philadelphia in ballast on 11 August 1921. Upon return, Cotati was returned to the Shipping Board and subsequently was laid up in James River, becoming a part of the Reserve Fleet.

Following the dissolution of the Shipping Board under the Merchant Marine Act of 1936, Cotati was transferred to the United States Maritime Commission and remained part of the reserve fleet. In August 1937 it was reported that Maritime Commission ordered 38 ships laid up at Fort Eustis, including Cotati, to be repainted and inspected. The vessels returned to their anchorage following the completion of work. In December 1940 the Maritime Commission offered 24 laid up vessels for sale to any bidder on "as is, where is" basis. Due to high shipping losses suffered since the beginning of World War II, British shipping companies made a bid for all vessels through their New York City based broker, J. H. Winchester & Company. On 23 January 1941, the Maritime Commission agreed to sell 12 laid up ships, including Cotati, to British interests. As part of the deal, the British paid $218,298 for Cotati and additional $600,000 for repairs and refurbishing of the freighter. The sale was formally approved by the Maritime Commission in March of the same year, and Cotati together with two other vessels were transferred to the New Zealand Shipping Co. The ship was then moved to the Bethlehem Steel Co. shipyard to undergo repairs and prepare her for service. After completion of repairs and refurbishing, Cotati proceeded to New York and from there sailed out unescorted on 5 October 1941 bound for South America. After loading her usual cargo of frozen meat and other supplies, she departed Buenos Aires on 31 December 1941. While en route the ship was transferred under control of the Ministry of War Transport while still remaining under management of the New Zealand Shipping Co. Cotati arrived at Trinidad on 19 January 1942, and after nearly a three week delay, sailed out for Halifax reaching it 20 February.

The freighter remained in port for the next two months, finally being able to sail on 17 April as part of convoy SC 80. The steamer, however, developed problems with her machinery and was forced to turn back. After finalizing the repairs, Cotati left Halifax with convoy SC 82 on 30 April, and safely arrived at Liverpool on 16 May after largely an uneventful journey. Upon arrival in England, the vessel was defensively armed and renamed Empire Avocet. The freighter then left Liverpool on 21 July on her first voyage under new name as part of convoy OS-35 with a cargo of chemicals, machinery and general merchandise bound for South America. The ship left the convoy off the coast of Africa and proceeded independently to Montevideo and then to Buenos Aires, safely reaching her destination on 22 August. After unloading, Empire Avocet embarked her typical cargo at Buenos Aires and Rio Grande.

=== Sinking ===
Location of the sinking of Empire Avocet.

Empire Avocet departed Rio Grande for her last voyage on 16 September 1942. The vessel was under command of Captain Frederick Pover, had a crew of 51 men in addition to seven Navy gunners. The ship carried her usual cargo consisting of 3,724 tons of frozen meat and 1,225 tons of general merchandise, and was bound for Freetown. The voyage was rather uneventful until the freighter was about 350 nautical miles (650 km) south west of her destination. Shortly after midnight on 30 September 1942, while in an approximate position 04°05′N 13°23′W, she was spotted by U-125, commanded by Kapitänleutnant Ulrich Folkers. At about 00:35 U-125 fired one torpedo at Empire Avocet hitting her on port side near the funnel. The steamer stopped and started taking on water immediately prompting the captain to order the crew to abandon ship. At approximately 01:16, seeing that the freighter was still afloat, U-125 fired another torpedo, hitting the ship right behind the engine room. The vessel sank deeper but still remained afloat. Approximately 22 minutes later, a third torpedo was fired, delivering coup de grâce. Empire Avocet sank stern first about a minute later. Two crew members were killed in the attack, while the surviving 42 crew members and seven gunners found themselves in two large lifeboats. The submarine then closed in and took the captain and chief engineer aboard for interrogation. Both were taken prisoner.

The two lifeboats started rowing towards the shore, but were separated the next night. One of the boats containing the chief officer and 23 men was rescued by HMS Cowslip on 4 October and safely landed at Freetown the next day. On 7 October the second lifeboat, containing the second officer and 22 men made landfall near Bonthe.

Two crew members lost on Empire Avocet are commemorated at the Tower Hill Memorial in London.
