= SS Corinaldo =

UK refrigerated cargo liner

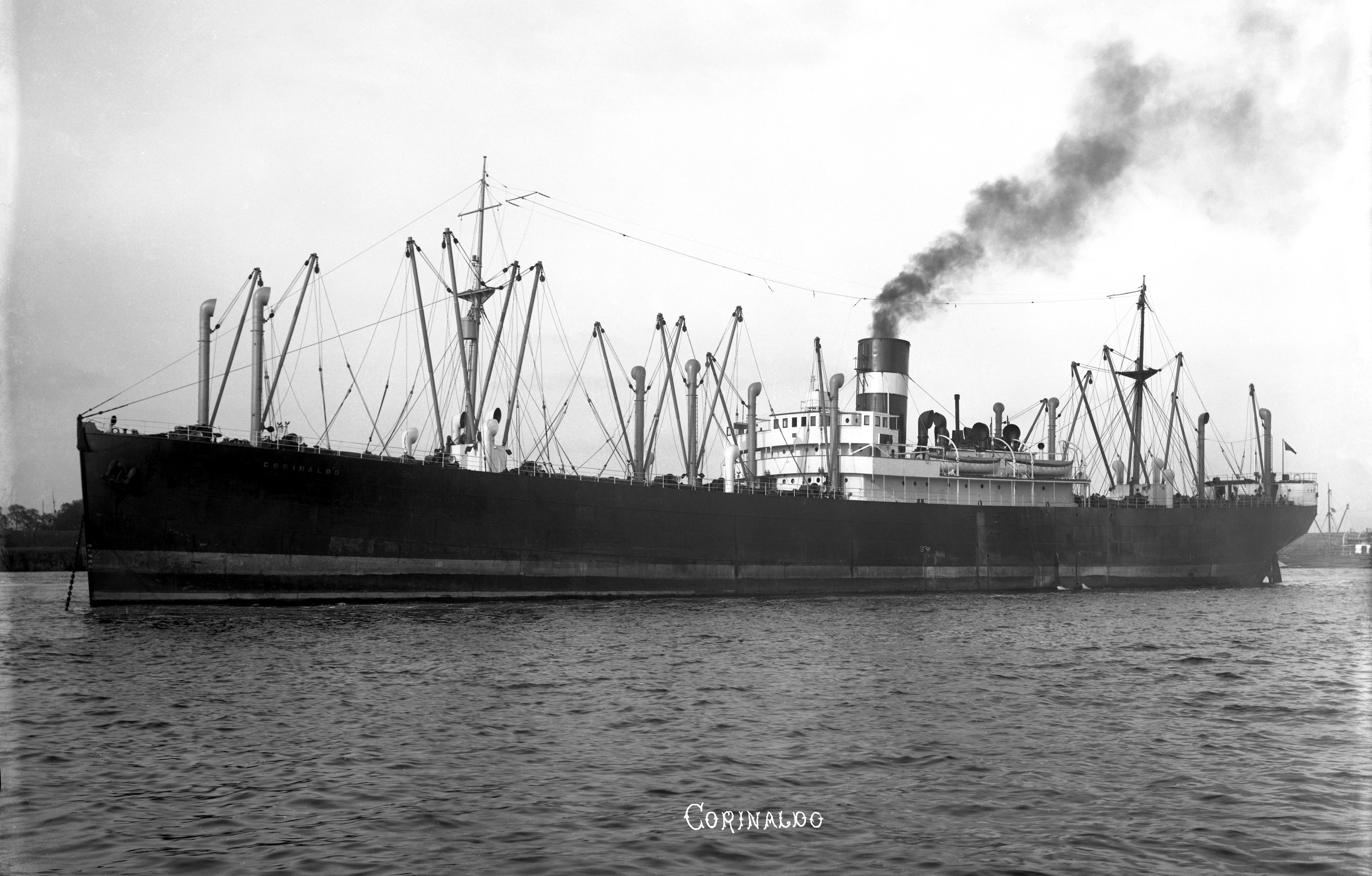
- Corinaldo, probably in the Scheldt

History

United Kingdom
- Name: Corinaldo
- Namesake: Corinaldo
- Owner: Donaldson South American Line
- Port of registry: Glasgow
- Route: Glasgow – east coast of South America
- Builder: Scott's, Greenock
- Yard number: 482
- Launched: 16 August 1920
- Completed: February 1921
- Identification: UK official number 144248; until 1933: code letters KHWM; by 1930: call sign GFDJ
- Fate: sunk by torpedoes & gunfire, 1942

General characteristics
- Type: refrigerated cargo steamship
- Tonnage: 7,131 GRT, 4,417 NRT, 8,505 DWT
- Length: 414.5 ft (126.3 m)
- Beam: 55.6 ft (16.9 m)
- Draught: 28 ft 8 in (8.74 m)
- Depth: 28.7 ft (8.7 m)
- Decks: 2 (3 in forward holds)
- Installed power: 2 × steam turbines; 736 NHP
- Propulsion: double reduction gearing; 1 × screw
- Speed: 12 kn (22 km/h)
- Capacity: cargo: 422,715 cu ft (11,970 m^{3}) refrigerated; 419,000 cu ft (11,865 m^{3}) grain; or; 401,000 cu ft (11,355 m^{3}) bale
- Crew: peacetime: 50; wartime: 49, + 9 DEMS gunners
- Sensors & processing systems: by 1924: wireless direction finding; by 1937: as above, plus echo sounding device
- Notes: sister ships: Cortona, Coracero

SS Corinaldo was a UK refrigerated cargo steamship. She was built in Scotland in 1921 for Donaldson South American Line. She was the lead ship of a class of three sister ships, and one of a fleet of five similar ships that Donaldson's ran on a weekly service between the UK and the east coast of South America.

In 1936, Corinaldo was involved in a collision in the South Atlantic with the French cargo liner Eubée. Five of Eubée's stokers were killed, and Eubée sank two days later. Corinaldo rescued Eubée's passengers and some of her crew, and was repaired and returned to service.

In 1942, three U-boats attacked Corinaldo in the space of a few hours. She stayed afloat after two torpedo hits, and then one of the U-boats finally sank her with a third torpedo, followed by gunfire. Eight members of Corinaldo's crew were killed.

She was the first of two Donaldson ships to be named after the Italian village of Corinaldo. The second was a motor ship that was launched in 1948, sold in 1967 and renamed Ningpo, and scrapped in 1980.

== Cor-class refrigerated cargo ships ==
In the First World War, Donaldson Brothers of Glasgow lost nine of their fleet of 13 ships. In 1919, they restructured the South American part of their business as a new, separate company, Donaldson South American Line (DSAL). Donaldson's provided half of DSAL's capital. The Glasgow Steamship Company provided 30 percent, and Vickers provided 20 percent. The new company ordered five new refrigerated cargo ships, in order to run a weekly service between Glasgow and the east coast of South America. They were all of a similar size, and all had steam turbines driving a single screw. Each had a Spanish or Italian name beginning with "Cor-", so they were called the Cor-class. However, despite being grouped as one class, they were built to two different designs.

The first design was by Short Brothers of Sunderland, who built two of the ships, Corrientes and Cordillera, in 1920. Each of this pair of ships had two separate superstructures. The first was amidships, and included the bridge. The second superstructure was slightly aft of the first; positioned above the stokehold and engine room; and included the funnel. There was one cargo hatch between the two superstructures.

The second design had a single superstructure, set slightly aft of amidships. Three ships were built to this design; each by a different shipbuilder. Scotts Shipbuilding and Engineering Company in Greenock on the Firth of Clyde built the lead ship of this design as yard number 517. She was launched on 16 August 1920 as Corinaldo, and completed in February 1921. Vickers in Barrow-in-Furness built the next ship, Cortona, which was launched on 14 September 1920 and completed in March 1921. Two years later, Lithgows in Port Glasgow built the final ship, Coracero, which was launched on 8 March 1923, and completed that May.

== Corinaldo ==
Corinaldo's registered length was 414.5 ft (126.3 m); her beam was 55.6 ft (16.9 m); her depth was 28.7 ft (8.7 m); and her draught was 28 ft 8 in (8.74 m). Her holds had 422,715 cubic feet (11,970 m^{3}) of refrigerated space. Alternatively, she could carry 419,000 cubic feet (11,865 m^{3}) of grain in bulk; or 401,000 cubic feet (11,355 m^{3}) of baled cargo. Her tonnages were 7,131 GRT, 4,417 NRT, and 8,505 DWT. Her single screw was driven by two steam turbines via double reduction gearing. The furnaces of her four boilers were oil-fuelled. The combined power of her turbines was rated at 736 NHP, and gave her a speed of 12 knots (22 km/h). She carried a crew of 50.

Donaldson's registered Corinaldo in Glasgow. Her UK official number was 144248, and her code letters were KHWM. By 1924 she was equipped with wireless direction finding. By 1930 her wireless telegraph call sign was GFDJ, and by 1934 this had superseded her code letters. By 1937, she was equipped with an echo sounding device.

== Collision with Eubée ==
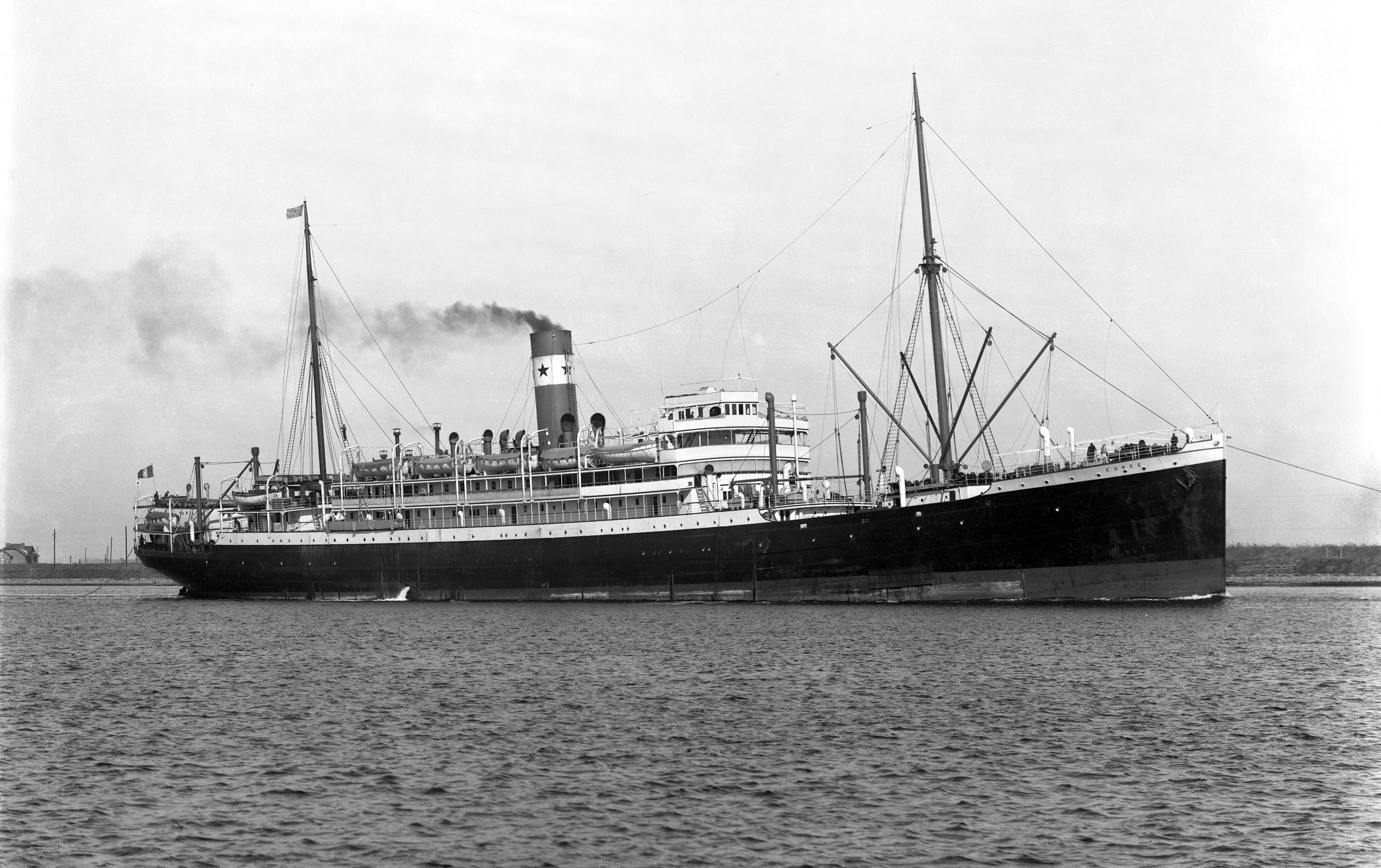
The Chargeurs Réunis cargo liner Eubée

On 14 August 1936, Corinaldo was on the South Atlantic, en route from Europe to Montevideo. She was near Santa Catarina Island, about 90 nautical miles (170 km) north of Rio Grande do Sul in Brazil, when at about 04:00 hrs she collided with the Chargeurs Réunis cargo liner Eubée in fog. Eubée's stokehold and engine room were flooded, five of her stokers were killed, and her electrical system failed. Both ships stayed afloat, but Eubée was badly damaged.

After two hours, Eubée's Master, Captain Raoul Daniel, ordered all 178 passengers into the lifeboats. About half an hour later, the fog lifted, and Corinaldo rescued the passengers, along with 36 members of Eubée's crew. Two passengers were injured in the rescue. One fell into the sea when being transferred to a lifeboat, and her leg was broken.

A reduced crew remained aboard Eubée to try to save the ship. Two tugs, the Rio Grande do Sul state government's Antonio Azambuja, and the Uruguayan Government's Powerful, took her in tow. However, two days later, on 16 August, Eubée sank. Antonio Azambuja rescued her remaining crew. Also on 16 August, Corinaldo landed survivors at Montevideo.

== Loss ==
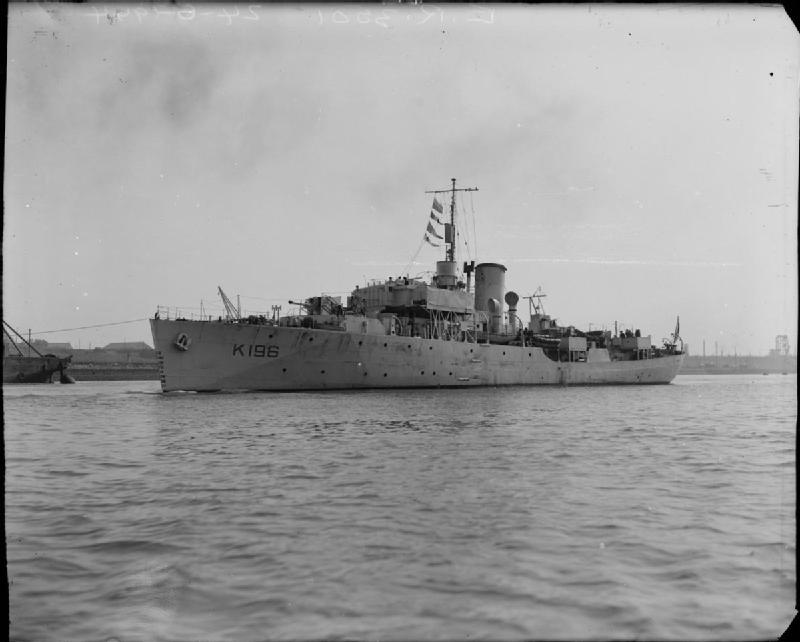
HMS Cowslip rescued Corinaldo's 50 survivors

In October 1942, Corinaldo left Buenos Aires for Glasgow carrying 5,141 tons of frozen meat. Her Master was Captain William Anderson. She carried 48 other civilian officers and men, plus nine gunners to man her DEMS armament. She crossed the South Atlantic to Freetown, Sierra Leone, where she joined Convoy SL 125, which left on 16 October. At 22:16 hrs (Berlin time) in 29 October, U-509 hit Corinaldo with one torpedo at position 33°20′N 18°12′W, west-northwest of Madeira. Seven members of her civilian crew, plus one of her gunners, were killed. Corinaldo dropped out of the convoy, and her crew abandoned her. The corvette HMS Cowslip rescued Captain Anderson, 41 crewmen, and eight DEMS gunners.

At 02:07 hrs (Berlin time) on 30 August, U-569 fired two torpedoes at the abandoned and drifting Corinaldo. According to one source, both missed. Either way, Corinaldo remained afloat. At 04:!6 hrs (Berlin time), U-203 hit Corinaldo with one torpedo, and then opened fire with her 88 mm deck gun. This sank Corinaldo north of the Canary Islands. Cowslip landed Corinaldo's survivors at Gibraltar.

== Bibliography ==
- Haws, Duncan (1988). Donaldson Line. Merchant Fleets. Vol. 13. Hereford: Travel Creatours Ltd Publications. ISBN 0-946378-09-6.
- Hocking, Charles (1969). Dictionary of Disasters at Sea During the Age of Steam. Vol. I A to L. London: Lloyd's Register of Shipping – via Internet Archive.
- Lloyd's Register of Shipping. Vol. II.–Steamers and Motor Vessels. London: Lloyd's Register of Shipping. 1922 – via Internet Archive.
- Lloyd's Register of Shipping. Vol. I.–Sailing Vessels. London: Lloyd's Register of Shipping. 1923 – via Internet Archive.
- Lloyd's Register of Shipping. Vol. II.–Steamers and Motorships of 300 Tons Gross and Over. London: Lloyd's Register of Shipping. 1934 – via Southampton City Council.
- Lloyd's Register of Shipping. Vol. II.–Steamers and Motorships of 300 Tons Gross and Over. London: Lloyd's Register of Shipping. 1937 – via Southampton City Council.
- Mercantile Navy List. London: Registrar General of Shipping and Seamen. 1930 – via Crew List Index Project.
