= SS Eubée =

French cargo liner, sunk in 1936

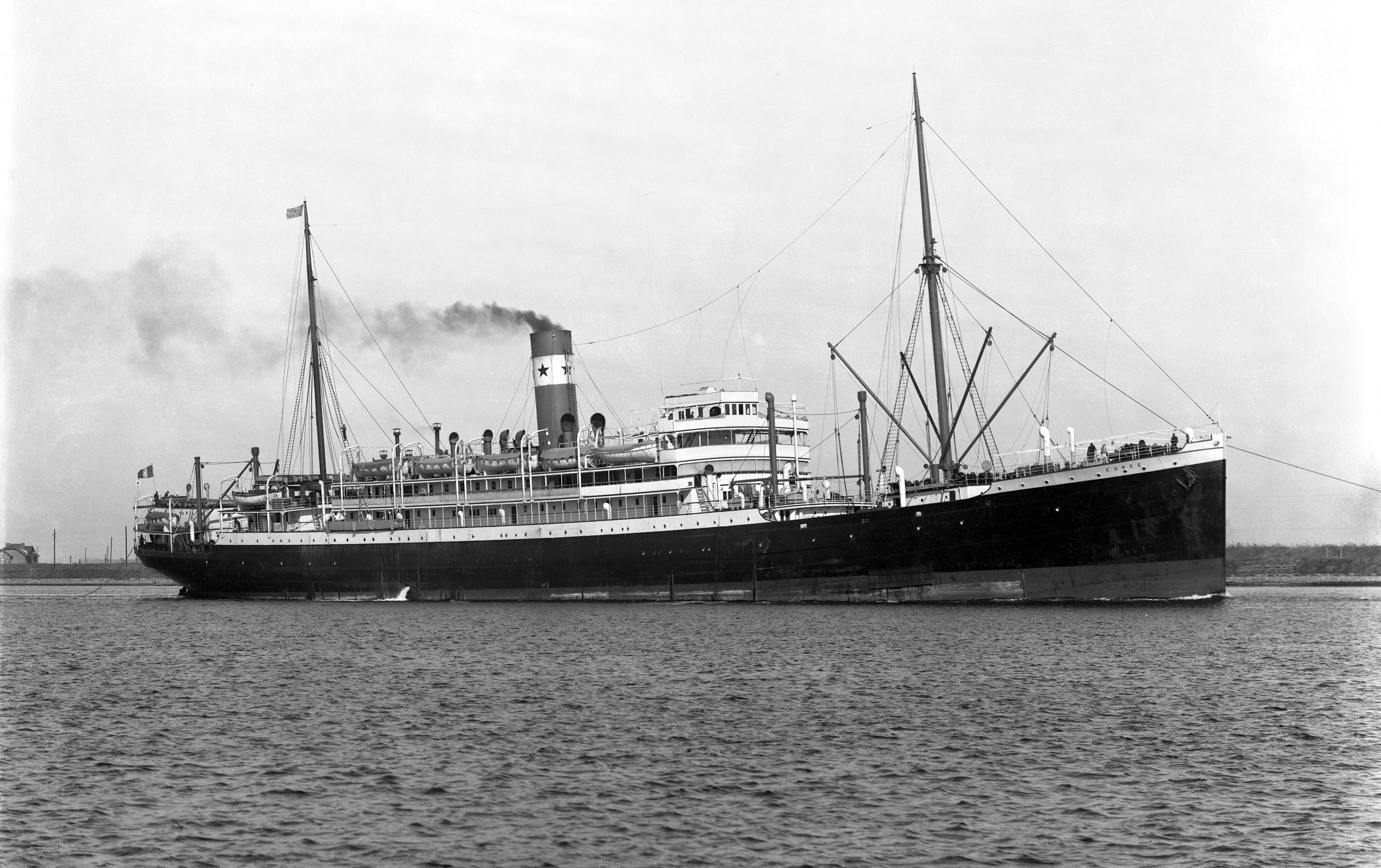
- Eubée, probably in the Scheldt

History

France
- Name: Eubée
- Namesake: Euboea
- Owner: Chargeurs Réunis
- Port of registry: Le Havre
- Route: Hamburg – Buenos Aires
- Builder: A & C de France, Dunkirk
- Completed: 1921
- Identification: until 1933: code letters OGUM; by 1934: call sign FNMH
- Fate: sank after collision, 1936

General characteristics
- Type: refrigerated cargo liner
- Tonnage: 9,582 GRT, 6,006 NRT, 8,070 DWT
- Length: 483.0 ft (147.2 m)
- Beam: 59.0 ft (18.0 m)
- Depth: 34.0 ft (10.4 m)
- Decks: 3
- Installed power: 2 × triple-expansion engines; 680 NHP
- Propulsion: 2 × screws
- Speed: 13 1/2 knots (25 km/h)
- Capacity: passengers: at least 178; baled cargo: 376,000 cu ft (10,600 m^{3}); refrigerated cargo: 304,640 cubic feet (8,626 m^{3})
- Sensors & processing systems: by 1930: wireless direction finding

SS Eubée was a refrigerated cargo liner that was built in France for Chargeurs Réunis in 1921. She was one of a fleet of similar ships that Chargeurs operated on scheduled services between Hamburg, Le Havre, and Buenos Aires.

In 1936, Eubée was involved in a collision in the South Atlantic with a British refrigerated cargo ship, in which five of her stokers were killed. Eubée's passengers and surviving crew were rescued, and tugboats took her in tow, but two days after the collision she sank.

== "Island"-series cargo liners ==
In 1907 and 1908, Chargeurs took delivery of three twin-screw cargo liners. Each was about 483.0 ft (147.2 m) long; 57 ft (17 m) beam, and had a pair of triple-expansion engines with a combined rating of about 680 NHP. Each was named after an island: Ceylan (Ceylon), Malte (Malta), and Ouessant (Ushant).

After the First World War, Chargeurs ordered further ships to a similar design. The beam was increased by about 3.3 feet (1 m), and in most cases the depths were increased, but the ships were otherwise similar. Désirade, Eubée, and Formose were completed in 1921; followed by Groix and Hoëdic in 1922.

Chargeurs ordered a final four ships in the same sequence, but with Rateau steam turbines instead of triple-expansion engines. Following the alphabetical sequence of names of islands, they were to be called Islande, Jamaique, Kerguelen, and Lipari. However, while they were still being built, Messageries Maritimes bought Islande, Jamaique, and Kerguelen, and had them completed in 1923 as Fontainebleau, Compiègne, and Chantilly. Of the final four, only Lipari was completed for Chargeurs.

== Building ==
Ateliers et Chantiers de France in Dunkirk built two members of Chargeurs' "Island"-series: Désirade, and Eubée; both completed in 1921. Eubée is French for Euboea in the Aegean, the second-largest island in Greece. Her registered length was 483.0 ft (147.2 m), her beam was 59.0 ft (18.0 m), and her depth was 34.0 ft (10.4 m). Her holds had capacity for 376,000 cubic feet (10,600 m^{3}) of baled cargo, and 304,640 cubic feet (8,626 m^{3}) of her holds were refrigerated. She had berths for at least 178 passengers. Her tonnages were 9,582 GRT, 6,006 NRT, and 8,070 DWT.

== Career ==
Chargeurs registered Eubée at Le Havre. Her code letters were OGUM. By 1930, she was equipped with wireless direction finding. By 1934, her wireless telegraph call sign was FNMH, and this had superseded her code letters.

Between April and November 1928, Chargeurs scheduled Eubée to make two round trip voyages between Hamburg and Buenos Aires. On both voyages, she was to call at Antwerp, Le Havre, Lisbon, Rio de Janeiro, Santos, and Montevideo in each direction. However, on the first voyage she was to call also at Funchal on the outbound leg, and at Vigo on the return leg. On the second voyage, she was to call also at La Rochelle, Bilbao, A Coruña, Leixões, Dakar on the outbound leg; and at Dakar, Leixões, Vigo and La Rochelle on the return leg.

== Loss ==
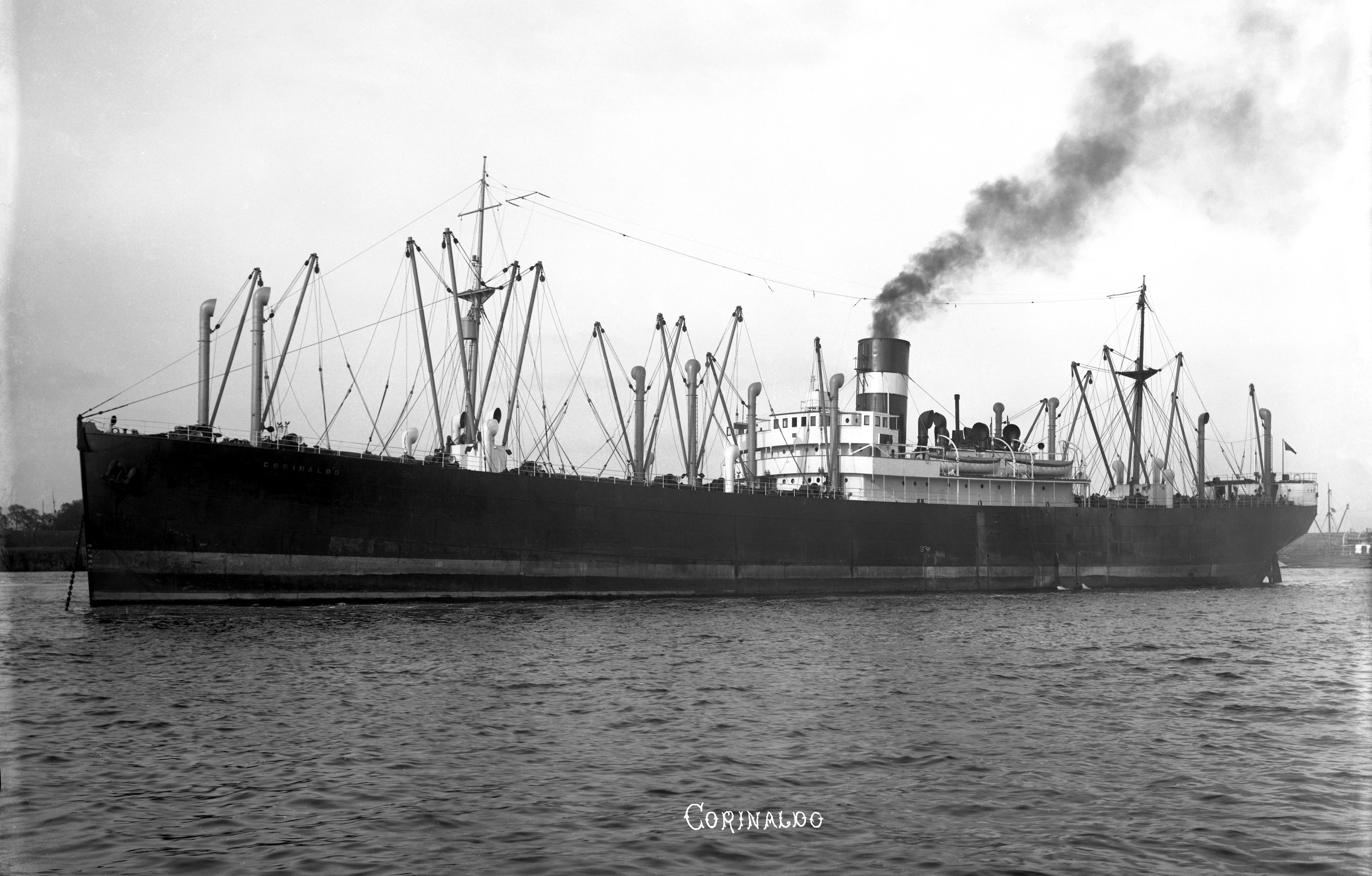
The Donaldson South American Line refrigerated cargo ship Corinaldo

On 14 August 1936, Eubée was on the South Atlantic, en route from Bordeaux to Buenos Aires. She was near Santa Catarina Island, about 90 nautical miles (170 km) north of Rio Grande do Sul in Brazil, when at about 04:00 hrs the Donaldson South American Line refrigerated cargo ship Corinaldo collided with her in fog. Eubée's stokehold and engine room were flooded, five of her stokers were killed, and her electrical system failed. Both ships stayed afloat, but Eubée was badly damaged.

After two hours, Eubée's Master, Captain Raoul Daniel, ordered all 178 passengers into the lifeboats. About half an hour later, the fog lifted, and Corinaldo rescued the passengers, along with 36 members of Eubée's crew. Two passengers were injured in the rescue. One fell into the sea when being transferred to a lifeboat, and her leg was broken.

A reduced crew remained aboard Eubée to try to save the ship. Two tugs, the Rio Grande do Sul state government's Antonio Azambuja, and the Uruguayan Government's Powerful, took her in tow. However, two days later, on 16 August, Eubée sank. Antonio Azambuja rescued her remaining crew. Also on 16 August, Corinaldo landed survivors at Montevideo.

== Bibliography ==
- Hocking, Charles (1969). Dictionary of Disasters at Sea During the Age of Steam. Vol. I A to L. London: Lloyd's Register of Shipping – via Internet Archive.
- Lloyd's Register of British and Foreign Shipping. Vol. I.–Steamers. London: Lloyd's Register of Shipping. 1910 – via Internet Archive.
- Lloyd's Register of Shipping. Vol. I.–Sailing Vessels. London: Lloyd's Register of Shipping. 1923 – via Internet Archive.
- Lloyd's Register of Shipping. Vol. II.–Steamers and Motorships. London: Lloyd's Register of Shipping. 1924 – via Internet Archive.
- Lloyd's Register of Shipping. Vol. II.–Steamers and Motorships of 300 Tons Gross and Over. London: Lloyd's Register of Shipping. 1930 – via Southampton City Council.
- Lloyd's Register of Shipping. Vol. II.–Steamers and Motorships of 300 Tons Gross and Over. London: Lloyd's Register of Shipping. 1934 – via Southampton City Council.
