= Compagnie Chargeurs Invest =

French company

Compagnie Chargeurs Invest SA
- Formerly: Compagnie Maritime des Chargeurs Réunis (1872–1981); Chargeurs SA (1981–1989); Chargeurs (1989–1996); Chargeurs International (1996–1997); Chargeurs (1997–2025)
- Type: Public
- Traded as: Euronext Paris: FR0000130692
- Industry: Manufacturing; Investment
- Founded: 1872; 154 years ago (brand); 1925; 101 years ago (company)
- Headquarters: Paris, France
- Key people: Michaël Fribourg (president and CEO)
- Website: chargeurs.com

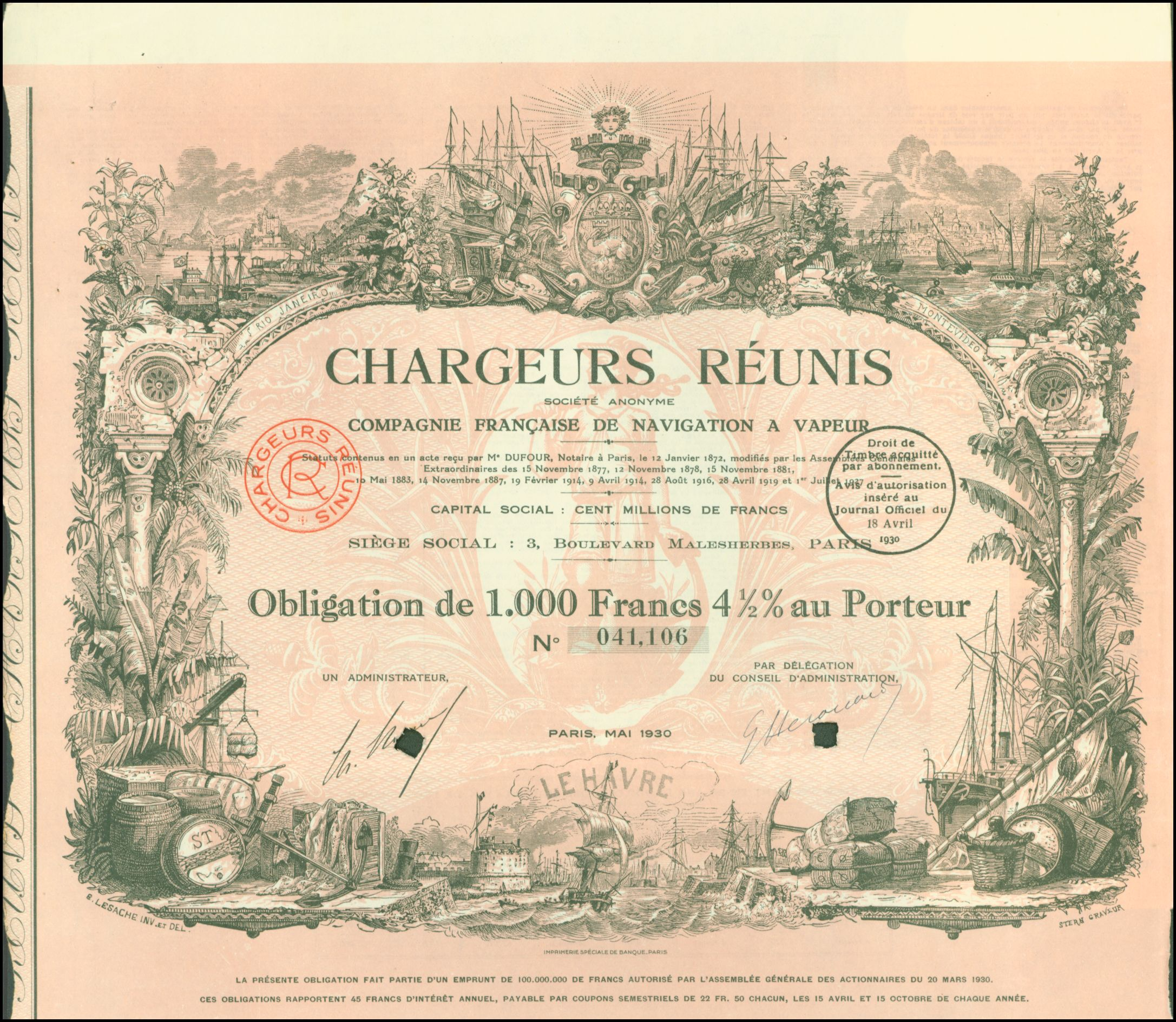
Bond of the Chargeurs Réunis SA, issued May 1930

Compagnie Chargeurs Invest is a French manufacturing and investment company formed in 1872.

== Profile and management ==
Chargeurs is a global, diversified group with leadership positions in niche markets, both in manufacturing and in services. It operates in three business segments:

- Temporary surface protection, through Chargeurs Protective Films
- Technical textiles, through Chargeurs Interlining
- Topmaking and combed wool sales, through Chargeurs Wool.

In 2012, consolidated revenue totaled €524.6 million, of which 94% was generated outside France. With operations in 33 countries on five continents, the Group has more than 1,800 employees.

Eduardo Malone is chairman and chief executive officer. The executive committee also includes Martine Odillard, chief operating officer, Laurent Derolez, managing director of Chargeurs Protective Films, Federico Paullier, managing director of Chargeurs Wool, and Stéphane Rigaut, managing director of Chargeurs Interlining.

== History ==
Chargeurs was formed in 1872 as a shipping company, named Compagnie Maritime des Chargeurs Réunis ('CMCR'), and primarily served in that industry until the 1950s, when increase of air travel led to the discontinution of passenger services.

Chargeurs was a shareholder in British Satellite Broadcasting, the official UK satellite broadcaster. BSB was set up in 1986 in competition with Rupert Murdoch's Sky Television. Sky was launched in 1989, a year earlier than BSB. Both companies suffered massive losses and BSB collapsed. This allowed a merger on Murdoch's terms to form British Sky Broadcasting. Chargeurs maintained a minority shareholding.

In 1992, Chargeurs bought media group Pathé for 1.2 billion francs. Chargeurs demerged Pathé in 1996: Chargeurs became an industrial group with textile activities and protective films business, whereas Pathé SA retained the media interests: the film, television, cinema chain and the shareholdings in pay TV operators British Sky Broadcasting (BSkyB) and CanalSatellite.

== Current structure ==
The company's three units are:

- Chargeurs Protective Films, which offers temporary surface protection
- Chargeurs Interlining, which manufactures technical textiles
- Chargeurs Wool, which provides raw material processing

== Links ==
- Official website
- "Chargeurs sur la voie d'une rentabilité durable".
- "Chargeurs: 2010 marque le retour aux bénéfices et aux désendettements". investir.fr.
- "La Compagnie financière Edmond de Rothschild renforcée dans chargeurs". investir.fr.
