= Spanish transport Almirante Lobo (1909) =

Spanish Navy transport of 1909–1942

- Almirante Lobo, from Jane's Fighting Ships, 1920.

History

Spain
- Name: Almirante Lobo
- Namesake: Miguel Lobo y Malagamba (1821–1875), Spanish admiral
- Ordered: 10 April 1907 (authorized)
- Awarded: 15 September 1907
- Builder: Scott of Kinghorn, Kinghorn, Scotland, United Kingdom
- Yard number: 140
- Launched: 6 April 1909
- Commissioned: May 1909
- Decommissioned: 28 February 1942
- Stricken: 1945
- Fate: Scrapped

General characteristics
- Type: Transport
- Tonnage: 1707 gross register tons; 999 net register tons
- Displacement: 2,545 tons
- Length: 79.92 m (262 ft 2 in)
- Beam: 11.58 m (38 ft 0 in)
- Draft: 4.32 m (14 ft 2 in)
- Depth: 6.22 m (20 ft 5 in)
- Installed power: 1,200 ihp (895 kW)
- Propulsion: One John Scott & Co. triple expansion engine, two boilers, one shaft
- Speed: 12 knots (22 km/h; 14 mph)
- Range: 4,540 nmi (8,410 km; 5,220 mi) at 8 knots (15 km/h; 9.2 mph)
- Complement: 76
- Armament: 2 x 6 pdr quick-firing guns
- Notes: 290 tons coal

A recognition silhouette of Almirante Lobo from Jane's Fighting Ships, 1920, depicting her with wireless transmitter aerials mounted on her topgallant masts.

Almirante Lobo was a transport of the Spanish Navy in commission from 1909 to 1942. She served in the Second Melillan Campaign in 1909, in the Rif War (1921–1926), and on the Republican side during the Spanish Civil War (1936–1939).

The first Spanish Navy ship to bear the name, Almirante Lobo was named for Contralmirante (Counter Admiral) Miguel Lobo y Malagamba (1821-1876), a prominent naval figure in 19th-century Spain who participated in the Battle of Callao in 1866 during the Chincha Islands War and commanded the central government fleet in the Battle of Portmán in 1873 during the Cantonal Rebellion.

== Design ==
Almirante Lobo was a troopship. Sources provide a number of different descriptions of her dimensions and characteristics. According to one, she was 79.92 metres (262 ft 2 in) long and had a beam of 11.58 metres (38 ft 0 in), and a draft of 4.32 metres (14 ft 2 in). She displaced 2,545 tons. Her triple-expansion steam enginegave her a maximum speed of 12 knots (22 km/h; 14 mph). She could carrying 290 tons of coal, giving her a range of 4,540 nautical miles (8,410 km; 5,220 mi) at 8 knots (15 km/h; 9.2 mph). She was armed with two 6-pounder (2.7 kg) 57 mm (2.2 in) 37-caliber quick-firing guns, both mounted on her forecastle. She had a crew of 76.

Another source describes Almirante Lobo as 74.83 metres (245 ft 6 in) long, with a beam of 11.61 metres (38 ft 1 in). It provides no draft information for her, but states her depth of hull was 6.22 metres (20 ft 5 in). It provides no displacement information for her, but describes her tonnage as 1,707 gross register tons and 999 net register tons (both measurements of volume rather than weight). It describes her propulsion system as consisting of a John Scott and Company vertical triple-expansion engine manufactured at Kirkcaldy, Scotland, with an official rating of 119 nominal horsepower (nhp), later re-rated or classified under varying registry standards as 177 nhp; in either case, nominal horsepower was an archaic, purely mathematical formula used by 19th-century and early-20th-century shipbuilders, insurers, and maritime authorities to estimate the physical size and volume of an engine rather than its power output. According to this source, the engine's power output was 1,200 horsepower (895 kilowatts), driving a single screw and giving her a designed top speed of 10.25 knots (18.98 km/h; 11.80 mph).

A third source claims she was 77.72 metres (255 ft 0 in) long, with a beam of 11.58 metres (38 ft 0 in) and a depth of hull of 6.86 metres (22 ft 6 in). It describes her propulsion plant as a triple expansion engine and two boilers and states that her maximum speed was 12 knots (22 km/h; 14 mph). It also describes her as having two steel masts and a fore-and-aft schooner rig. A large hatchway allowed her to load even large artillery pieces or boilers. Her after hold was divided into compartments for carrying ammunition and shells, kept well ventilated by a series of electrically driven fans to keep compartment loaded with explosives from becoming dangerously hot. She had an awning deck, and her tweendecks could accommodate 400 troops in hammocks. It states that she had a crew of 100.

A fourth source provides yet another description of her. It states that she was 79 metres (259 ft 2 in) long, with a beam of 11.58 metres (38 ft 0 in) and a draft of 4.32 metres (14 ft 2 in), and displaced 2,545 tons. It describes her propulsion system as consisting of two steam engines generating 1,170 horsepower (870 kilowatts) and giving her a top speed of 11 knots (20 km/h; 13 mph), and states that her range was 4,500 nautical miles (8,300 km; 5,200 mi). It claims her armament consisted of two 42 millimetres (1.7 in) Nordenfelt guns, probably conflating the Nordenfelt 6-pounder's barrel length (42 calibers) with its caliber, which actually was 57 mm (2.2 in). It states that she had a crew of 70 men.

A fifth source gives her length as 74.50 metres (244 ft 5 in) long, her beam as 11.55 metres (37 ft 11 in), her depth of hull as 4.50 metres (14 ft 9 in), and her displacement as 2,500 tons.

== Construction and commissioning ==
A royal order of 10 April 1907 authorized the construction of Almirante Lobo, and the Spanish Ministry of the Navy contracted for her construction with Scott of Kinghorn on 15 September 1907. The company's shipyard at Kinghorn, Scotland, laid her keel with yard number 140, and launched her on 6 April 1909, sponsored by a woman identified as "Miss Devlin" of Granton, Edinburgh. She was launched with steam up, and proceeded to Burntisland to coal before running her sea trials. She ran her trials on 10 April 1909, reaching 11.8 knots (21.9 km/h; 13.6 mph), exceeding the 10 knots (19 km/h; 12 mph) required by her contract. She was provisionally registered to Scott of Kinghorn Ltd in Burntisland, Scotland, under British official number 123101 on 14 April pending her transfer to the Spanish Navy.

On 15 April 1909, Almirante Lobo departed the Firth of Forth on her delivery voyage to Spain. She arrived at Ferrol on 18 April. Her official transfer to the Spanish Navy occurred on 27 April 1909. She proceeded to the Arsenal de La Carraca at San Fernando in May 1909 to have her guns installed. With this complete, the Spanish Navy commissioned her in May 1909.

== Service history ==
=== 1909–1919 ===
The Second Melillan Campaign began in the Rif region of northern Morocco in July 1909, pitting Spanish forces against Riffian tribes in the area around Melilla. Almirante Lobo carried troops and materiel from Spain to North Africa during the campaign, notably when she transported a battalion of Spanish Marine Infantry which captured both Alcazarquivir and Larache. On 19 August 1909, the squadron operating off Morocco was divided into two groups. The first group, under the direct command of the squadron commander, Contralmirante (Counter Admiral) José Morgado y Pita da Veiga, consisted of Almirante Lobo, the armored cruisers Emperador Carlos V and Princesa de Asturias, the protected cruiser Extremadura, the coastal defense ship Numancia, the torpedo gunboat Vicente Yáñez Pinzón, and the destroyer Osado. The second, under the command of the commander of the Cádiz naval station, Contralmirante (Counter Admiral) Enrique Santaló y Sáenz de Tejada, was made up of the gunboats Álvaro de Bazán, Doña María de Molina, General Concha, Hernán Cortés, Marqués de la Victoria, and Ponce de León. The campaign ended in December 1909.

In May 1910, Almirante Lobo, the armored cruiser Cataluña, and the torpedo boats Acevedo and Barceló proceeded from Cartagena to Valencia, where they attended a visit to the city that month by King Alfonso XIII. When King Alfonso XIII visited Melilla on 8 January 1911 aboard the royal yacht Giralda, his escort included Almirante Lobo, Cataluña, Princesa de Asturias, Extremadura, Numancia, Álvaro de Bazán, the protected cruiser Río de la Plata, and the destroyers Audaz and Terror.

Late in April 1911, a French intervention in Morocco took place, leading to the Agadir Crisis between France and the German Empire, which began in July 1911. Anticipating a crisis when the French intervened, the Spanish Ministry of the Navy ordered the Training Squadron — which functioned as a home squadron for the Spanish Navy — to concentrate at Cádiz. Almirante Lobo, Cataluña, Emperador Carlos V, Princesa de Asturias, Extremadura, Río de la Plata, Álvaro de Bazán, Doña María de Molina, Audaz, the protected cruiser Reina Regente, and the unprotected cruiser Infanta Isabel gathered there along with a large number of Spanish Marine Infantry troops. The force conducted various amphibious landing exercises in the following days.

By the end of May 1911, Spanish concern over French moves in Tunisia so alarmed the Spanish government that Spain decided to occupy Larache to preempt any possible French move into the Spanish sphere of influence in Morocco. On 3 June 1911, the 1st and 2nd Companies of the 1st Battalion of the 1st Regiment boarded Almirante Lobo and the 3rd Company boarded Cataluña at San Fernando. They got underway in the afternoon, and on the morning of 4 June they anchored six cables — 0.6 nautical miles (1.1 km; 0.7 mi) — from the Larache bar at the mouth of the Loukkos River. Shortly afterwards, the Moroccan medical barge arrived alongside Cataluña with a doctor on board, and the Moroccans, when Cataluña′s crew asked them, expressed a strong desire for the marines to disembark. During the afternoon of 4 June, the Spanish consul and the captain in charge of the indigenous police boarded Cataluña to consult with the commander of the Spanish expedition. The marines remained aboard the ships, awaiting developments and further instructions, before finally disembarking during the night of 7–8 June along with Cataluña′s artillery section. The landing was peaceful, and the local population greeted the Spaniards warmly. However, most of the Marines and Cataluña′s artillery section quickly moved to Ksar el-Kebir to defend that town against an anticipated assault by rebel Kabyles. In the end, the landing force faced no opposition and the Spaniards completed the occupation without fighting.

On 1 February 1912, the Spanish Navy designated Almirante Lobo as a "special services vessel," indicating her future use as a multipurpose auxiliary ship rather than strictly as a troopship. Among other things, however, she continued service as a troopship. Between 12 and 19 June 1913, she landed troops and materiel in Jebala in Spanish Morocco during the Yebala campaign.

After the Battle of Santiago de Cuba during the Spanish-American War in 1898, 31 Spanish prisoners-of-war captured in that battle died in the United States and were buried at the Portsmouth Navy Yard on Seavey's Island in Kittery, Maine. Years of diplomatic and administrative delays and the expense of chartering a ship to transport them stalled the repatriation of their remains until Almirante Lobo called at New York City in mid-March 1916 to load military materiel Spain had purchased in the United States. The Spanish and U.S. governments seized the opportunity presented by Almirante Lobo′s visit to the United States to finally repatriate the deceased men. The men's remains were exhumed and on 12 April 1916 were loaded aboard Almirante Lobo at the Portsmouth Navy Yard for transportation to Spain, with United States Navy Rear Admiral Austin M. Knight representing the United States Department of the Navy at the transfer ceremony and the U.S. Navy armored cruiser USS Washington, gunboat USS Sacramento, and steamer USS Southery in attendance. Almirante Lobo arrived at the Arsenal de La Carraca in San Fernando on 29 April, where the deceased men received much-delayed posthumous honors prior to their reburial in Spain on 3 May 1916.

=== 1920–1936 ===
The new Spanish Navy submarine rescue ship Kanguro — constructed at Haarlem in the Netherlands — departed Amsterdam with a Spanish crew on 18 November 1920 to begin her delivery voyage to Spain, escorted by Almirante Lobo. The ships encountered rough weather during the trip and Kanguro sustained damage. They called at Ferrol — where Kanguro underwent repairs — from 24 November to 4 December 1920. The two ships then got back underway and proceeded to the Arsenal de La Carraca at San Fernando, which they reached on 8 December 1920.

Kanguro (left) and Almirante Lobo (right) moored at Barcelona in September 1921 with submarines and torpedo boats between them.

Almirante Lobo arrived at Barcelona on the afternoon of 11 September 1921 carrying two seaplanes of the Spanish Naval Air Arm. Also at Barcelona were Audaz and Río de la Plata. The Spanish Navy's submarine training division arrived at Barcelona on the afternoon of 12 September, with Kanguro in the lead, followed by the submarines Isaac Peral, Narciso Monturiol, Cosme García, and A-3 and then by the torpedo boats No. 1, No. 5, No. 21, and No. 22. Kanguro and the submarines remained at Barcelona for a week, and their visit took place to allow Minister of the Navy José Gómez Acedo and the chief of the naval staff, Vicealmirante (Vice Admiral) Salvador Buhigas, to review the Spanish Navy's submarine and torpedo boat flotillas and demonstrate for them the navy's newest acquisitions. What followed were the Spanish Navy's first sea-and-air exercises.

Amidst a thick fog that later dissipated, the two flotillas got underway at 09:30 on 13 September 1921 to begin maneuvers. With crowds looking on from shore and aboard private boats, Kanguro and the torpedo boats left port first, followed later by Almirante Lobo and the submarines. Two seaplanes also took off, and a tethered balloon was launched. Kanguro stood by while the submarines carried out various activities during the day. Activities continued through the morning of 19 September, when Kanguro weighed anchor and led the squadron out of the harbor, followed by the submarines and then the torpedo boats. Almirante Lobo and Audaz accompanied them. With Gómez Acedo and Buhigas embarked on Narciso Monturiol, the vessels conducted diving maneuvers and antisubmarine warfare exercises with naval aircraft. The activities concluded later in the morning, and Gómez Acedo and Buhigas transferred from Narciso Monturiol to Audaz and then to Río de la Plata. Kanguro and the rest of the submarine training division departed later in the day.

During the Rif War (1921–1926), Almirante Lobo took part in the Alhucemas landing at Alhucemas (now Al Hoceima) in Spanish Morocco on 8 September 1925.

In 1928, Almirante Lobo steamed from Alicante to Fiume, Italy, to load torpedoes for Spain's new C-class submarines. She transported the torpedoes to Cartagena. In October and November 1928, the submarines B-1, B-2, B-3, B-4, B-5, B-6, C-1, and C-2 conducted maneuvers in the Mediterranean Sea under the overall command of Capitán de navío (Ship-of-the-Line Captain) Mateo García de los Reyes, a future contralmirante (counter admiral) and minister of the navy. Almirante Lobo, serving as García de los Reyes's flagship during the maneuvers, arrived at Palma de Mallorca on Mallorca in the Balearic Islands at midnight on 2 November 1928, and the eight submarines, as well as the submarine Isaac Peral, subsequently anchored there as well.

In April 1931, the Kingdom of Spain was replaced with the Second Spanish Republic. Almirante Lobo subsequently served in the Spanish Republican Navy.

In mid-February 1934, Almirante Lobo steamed from Cartagena to Ceuta with the destroyer Velasco to join Spanish naval forces in North Africa. On the morning of 17 March 1934, the destroyers Alcalá Galiano and Churruca arrived at Barcelona from Cartagena, bringing Spanish Navy electricians to replace those on strike during a general strike in the city. Almirante Lobo and the destroyers Almirante Valdés and Lepanto reached Barcelona on 18 March, also transporting naval electricians. Almirante Lobo and the four destroyers departed Barcelona on 22 March to return to Cartagena. In 1934, Almirante Lobo became a support ship for minelayers at the Cartagena Naval Base.

=== Spanish Civil War ===
On 16 July 1936, the Spanish Civil War began with an unsuccessful coup by Nationalist forces against the government of the Second Spanish Republic. At the time Almirante Lobo was at the Cartagena Naval Base, moored at the oil pier. On 19 July, Almirante Lobo′s crew received word of the murder of a teniente de navío (ship-of-the-line lieutenant) and that the Nationalist uprising had spread to other cities in Spain and to Spanish Morocco. Her commanding officer explained calmly that the crew would have to wait for the arrival of instructions from the higher command before taking action, but the lack of such direction led to unease among the crew.

Later on 19 July, the destroyer Almirante Valdés arrived at the base. Seeing that the destroyer's crew had mutinied in support of the Republican faction and arrested her officers on suspicion of Nationalist sympathies, Almirante Lobo′s commanding officer and executive officer went ashore to request orders from the base commander, Vicealmirante (Vice Admiral) Francisco Márquez y Román. They returned to Almirante Lobo at 22:00, disappointed that the higher command had decided not to take action against mutinous Republican sailors.

On the morning of 20 July 1936, a detachment of sailors arrived and blocked Almirante Lobo′s gangway to prevent anyone from disembarking. Márquez and the base's second-in-command, Contralmirante (Counter Admiral) Camilo Molins y Carreras, arrived by car and relieved all of Almirante Lobo′s officers of their responsibilities. Although the ship's crew had remained loyal to their officers up to that point, they now shifted to support of the Republican side, among the last of the crews at the base to do so. The base's command declared Almirante Lobo to be a prison ship, and her own officers were imprisoned aboard her. The commanding officer of the tug Ciclope joined the Republican cause that afternoon, and Almirante Lobo′s crew observed Ciclope′s officers going ashore under arrest as they were transferred to Almirante Lobo. As the afternoon wore on, officers who had been arrested elsewhere also boarded Almirante Lobo and were imprisoned aboard her, all of them stripped of their rank insignia.

Almirante Lobo remained under Republican control for the remainder of the civil war. In May 1938, she was moored at Valencia during an attack by Nationalist aircraft. A bomb struck her on her starboard bow, causing her forward cargo hold to flood rapidly. The ship took on a severe starboard list as her crew and local firefighters used buckets and portable pumps to manage the inflow of water. Initially, the pumping equipment failed, almost resulting in the loss of the ship, but the deployment of higher-capacity emergency pumps stabilized her. Although crippled, she remained afloat and was towed into a dry dock for temporary repairs.

The civil war ended on 1 April 1939, culminating in a Nationalist victory and the establishment of Francoist Spain.

=== 1939–1942 ===
With the war over, Almirante Lobo became part of the reunified Spanish Navy. The Nationalists found Almirante Lobo badly damaged at Valencia. She never again was seaworthy, but underwent repairs sufficient to allow her to be towed to Cartagena, where she was hulked. She served as a floating jetty and coal depot there.

== Disposal ==
Almirante Lobo was decommissioned on 28 February 1942. Spain remained neutral during World War II (1939–1945), but in late November 1942 the French Navy submarine Iris, fleeing Toulon to avoid capture by the Germans and Italians during their their occupation of Vichy France, arrived at Cartagena and was interned for the remainder of the war. Almirante Lobo′s decommissioned hulk provided accommodation for Iris′s crew. In 1945, Almirante Lobo was stricken from the naval register, and she subsequently was scrapped.
