= Spanish submarine B-1 =

Spanish Navy submarine of 1922–1941

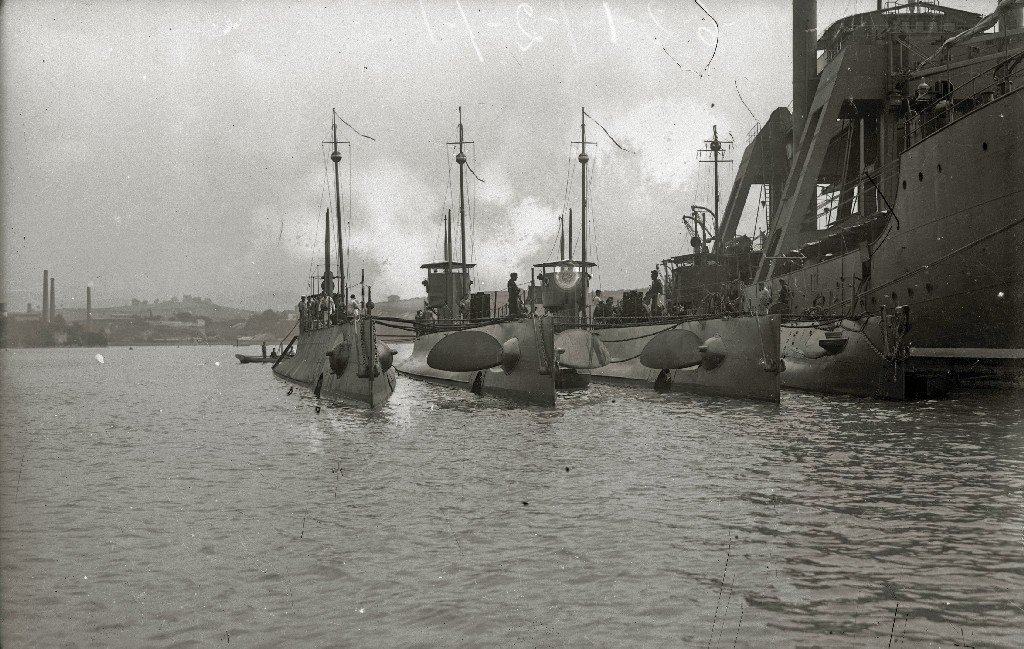
- B-class submarines alongside the submarine rescue ship Kanguro in Pasaia Bay in 1922.

History

Spain
- Name: B-1
- Builder: SECN, Cartagena, Spain
- Laid down: 1 February 1917
- Launched: 2 June 1921
- Commissioned: 11 January 1922
- Decommissioned: 21 October 1941
- Identification: Pennant number B-1
- Fate: Sunk as target 1949

General characteristics (per Conway's 1906–1921)
- Class & type: B-class submarine
- Displacement: 491 long tons (499 t) surfaced; 715 long tons (726 t) submerged
- Length: 62.5 m (205 ft) pp; 64.1 m (210 ft 4 in) oa
- Beam: 5.6 m (17 ft 4 in)
- Draft: 3.4 m (11 ft 3 in)
- Installed power: 1,400 bhp (1,044 kW) diesel; 850 hp (634 kW) electric
- Propulsion: 2 × NELSECO diesel engines; 2 × electric motors; 2 × screws
- Speed: 16 knots (30 km/h; 18 mph) surfaced; 10 knots (19 km/h; 12 mph) submerged
- Range: 8,000 nmi (15,000 km; 9,200 mi) at 10.5 knots (19.4 km/h; 12.1 mph) surfaced; 125 nmi (232 km; 144 mi) at 4.5 knots (8.3 km/h; 5.2 mph) submerged
- Complement: 28
- Armament: 4 × 457 mm (18 in) torpedo tubes (2 bow, 2 stern); 1 × 3 in (76 mm) deck gun

General characteristics (per Todoavante)
- Class & type: B-class submarine
- Displacement: 564 long tons (573 t) surfaced; 716 long tons (727 t) submerged
- Length: 64.18 m (210 ft 7 in)
- Beam: 5.6 m (18 ft 4 in)
- Draft: 3.44 m (11 ft 3 in) (mean)
- Depth: 5.1 m (16 ft 9 in)
- Installed power: 1,400 bhp (1,044 kW) diesel; 420 hp (313 kW) electric
- Propulsion: 2 × 700 hp (522 kW) diesel engines; 2 × 210 hp (157 kW) electric motors; 2 × screws
- Speed: 16.22 knots (30.04 km/h; 18.67 mph) surfaced; 10.5 knots (19.4 km/h; 12.1 mph) submerged
- Range: 2,600 nmi (3,000 mi; 4,800 km) at 16 knots (30 km/h; 18 mph) surfaced; 4,900 nmi (5,600 mi; 9,100 km) at 10.5 knots (19.4 km/h; 12.1 mph) surfaced; 10 nmi (12 mi; 19 km) at 10.5 knots (19.4 km/h; 12.1 mph) submerged; 90 nmi (100 mi; 170 km) at 4.5 knots (8.3 km/h; 5.2 mph) submerged
- Test depth: 60 m (197 ft)
- Complement: As built: 28; From 1934: 34
- Armament: 4 × 450 mm (17.7 in) torpedo tubes (2 bow, 2 stern); 8 × Whitehead X-150 torpedoes; 1 × 76 mm (3 in) antiaircraft gun

B-1 was the lead ship of the Spanish Navy's B-class submarines. The first submarine built in Spain in the 20th century, she was in commission from 1922 to 1941. She served initially under the Kingdom of Spain, seeing service during the Rif War in 1922, then was a unit of the Spanish Republican Navy under the Second Spanish Republic. She took part in the Spanish Civil War on the side of the Republican faction loyal to the government of the Second Spanish Republic. After the war, she became part of the naval forces of Francoist Spain.

== Construction and commissioning ==
In 1915, the Spanish Cortes Generales passed the Miranda Law, a naval construction program which called for a Spanish Navy force that included 28 submarines. Shortages during World War I (1914–1918) and budgetary limitations led to delays in the program, and none of the B-class submarines entered service until the 1920s. The Sociedad Española de Construcción Naval (SECN) built all six of the submarines at Cartagena, Spain.

B-1 was the lead ship of the class. SECN laid her keel on 1 February 1917 and launched her on 2 June 1921. She was commissioned on 11 January 1922 with Capitán de corbeta (Corvette Captain) Francisco Regalado Rodríguez — a future almirante (admiral) — in command.

== Service history ==
=== Kingdom of Spain, 1922–1931 ===
==== Rif War ====
When B-1 entered service, the Rif War, which pitted Spanish forces against Berber tribes, was raging in the Rif region of Spanish Morocco in North Africa. Capitán de fragata (Frigate Captain) Mateo García de los Reyes — a future contralmirante (counter admiral) and minister of the navy — took command of an operation to evacuate wounded and non-combatant personnel from Peñón de Vélez de la Gomera, which in 1922 still was an islet just off the coast of North Africa, although a 1930 storm created a peninsula which now connects it with the mainland. With the submarine Isaac Peral (A-0) as García de los Reyes's flagship, B-1 and Isaac Peral departed Cartagena on 17 April 1922 and headed for Melilla on the coast of North Africa, where they rendezvoused with the battleship España, which assisted them in the operation. They got underway from Melilla on the evening of 17 April and set course for Peñón de Vélez de la Gomera. They came under heavy fire during the operation, but completed the evacuation. The two submarines then called at Águilas on 20 April before returning to Cartagena, where they arrived on 21 April 1922.

B-1, Isaac Peral, and the submarine A-3 departed Cartagena on 2 June 1922 escorted by the torpedo boat No. 22. They called at Málaga from 3 to 5 June, then headed for Peñón de Alhucemas, an islet in the Alhucemas Islands which was under siege by Riffian forces and in urgent need of fresh water. While A-3 operated in a reconnaissance and support role, B-1 and Isaac Peral approached Peñón de Alhucemas during the night of 5–6 June, but the Riffians sighted them and opened fire on them from five different points along the coast. This prompted the submarines to withdraw to Melilla before returning to Cartagena on 7 June 1922.

B-1, Isaac Peral, A-3, and the submarine B-2 got underway from Cartagena on 20 June 1922 to begin another attempt to resupply the Alhucemas Islands. They called at Málaga before getting back underway on 23 June and arriving at the islands that night. The submarines resupplied Peñón de Alhucemas during the night of 23–24 June. They withdrew before dawn and the submarines headed for Melilla. They arrived at Cartagena on 25 June 1922.

B-1, B-2, and the torpedo boat No. 22 conducted a reconnaissance of Peñón de Vélez de la Gomera on 27 July 1922. During the operation, the Rifians opened rifle fire on them.

==== 1922–1931 ====
By August 1922, the Spanish Navy's submarine flotilla consisted of B-1, her sister ships B-2 and B-3, Isaac Peral, and the three A-class submarines — Narcíso Monturiol (A-1), Cosme García (A-2), and A-3. All seven submarines departed Cartagena on 26 August and made for San Sebastián, where in September 1922 they held commemorative events marking the 400th anniversary of the completion of the first circumnavigation of the world, begun in 1519 by the Portuguese explorer Ferdinand Magellan and completed after Magellan's death by the Spanish navigator, shipowner, and explorer Juan Sebastián Elcano in 1522. King Alfonso XIII boarded B-1 at Pasajes on 9 September 1922 and traveled submerged to San Sebastián aboard her. After the royal visit, the submarine flotilla conducted exercises and made port calls at Ferrol, Marín, and Vigo. On 25 September 1922, B-1, B-2, B-3, Isaac Peral, Cosme García, A-3, and the tug Cíclope arrived at Cádiz. The same vessels departed Cádiz on 4 October 1922 in company with the submarine rescue ship Kanguro and proceeded to Cartagena.

With King Alfonso XIII observing from aboard the destroyer Villaamil, the submarine flotilla conducted maneuvers in the Mediterranean Sea off Cartagena in March 1923. Later in 1923, the Spanish Navy reorganized its submarine force, creating a submarine division based at Mahón on Menorca in the Balearic Islands made up of Narciso Monturiol and Cosme García and a training division based at Cartagena consisting of B-1, B-2, B-3, B-4, Isaac Peral, and A-3. B-1, B-2, B-3, B-4, and Isaac Peral, carried out a training cruise off Catalonia and in the Balearic Islands between 14 September and 14 October 1923 and called at Alicante in mid-October 1923.

King Alfonso XIII, Queen Victoria Eugenie, and Prime Minister Miguel Primo de Rivera embarked on the battleship Jaime I on 15 November 1923 and departed for Italy on 16 November accompanied by the Trasmediterránea mail steamer Rey Jaime I — which was carrying the royal entourage — and escorted by B-1, B-2, B-3, B-4, the battleship Alfonso XIII, the light cruiser Reina Victoria Eugenia, and the destroyers Cadarso and Villaamil. The royal family disembarked at La Spezia, Italy. On 21 November, the squadron anchored at Naples, Italy. After the completion of the royal visit, the squadron returned to Spain, arriving at Barcelona on 1 December and at Cartagena on 14 December 1923.

In 1926, B-1 and Isaac Peral received orders to form a new submarine division at Ferrol. Getting underway from Cartagena, they stopped at Vigo on 1 September and then arrived at Ferrol on 3 September 1926 under escort by the tug Cíclope. At Ferrol, B-1 was modernized in a refit and Isaac Peral also underwent repairs. With the work complete, the two submarines moved to the naval station at A Graña, about 0.8 kilometres (0.5 miles) from the Ferrol naval station, during the first week of January 1927.

B-1 and Isaac Peral departed Ferrol on 4 August 1927 with several officers embarked for submarine training. The two submarines again got underway on 11 August 1927 to conduct diving exercises in the Ares estuary off Ares. In October 1927, the two submarines entered dry dock for repairs.

During 1927, B-2, B-3, and B-4 joined the submarine division based at A Graña. In August and September 1928, B-1, B-2, B-3, B-4, and the submarines B-5, B-6, C-1, and C-2 carried out maneuvers in the Cantabrian Sea along the northern coast of Spain. In October and November 1928, all eight of the submarines conducted maneuvers in the Mediterranean Sea under the command of García de los Reyes. During the maneuvers, García de los Reyes's flagship, the troopship Almirante Lobo, arrived at Palma de Mallorca on Mallorca in the Balearic Islands at midnight on 2 November 1928, and the eight submarines, as well as the submarine Isaac Peral, subsequently anchored there as well. With Isaac Peral as its flagship, the submarine squadron called at Barcelona from 11 November until the morning of 20 November 1928 for a crew rest period.

In May 1929, all six B-class submarines as well as C-1, C-2, and their sister ship C-3 attended the 1929 Barcelona International Exposition, arriving in Barcelona a few days before the exposition officially opened on 19 May. They remained at Barcelona until the last week of May. Accompanied by the tug Galicia, B-1, B-2, B-3, and B-4, anchored at Ferrol at the end of July 1929 to again form the Ferrol submarine division based at A Graña. B-1 took part in the annual squadron maneuvers in the Mediterranean Sea between mid-September and mid-October 1929, arriving in Barcelona in mid-October 1929 for a crew rest period. B-1, B-2, B-3, and B-4, began repairs at the Ferrol dockyard on 25 April 1930. On 5 June 1930, the four submarines got underway from Ferrol to begin a cruise along the northern coast of Spain, during which they visited several ports. In September and October 1930, they took part in maneuvers in the Cantabrian Sea off the northern coast of Spain.

=== Second Spanish Republic, 1931–1936 ===
On 14 April 1931, the Second Spanish Republic was proclaimed, replacing the Kingdom of Spain. The Spanish Navy came under the republic's control as the Spanish Republican Navy.

B-1, B-2, B-4 and the torpedo boats No. 2, No. 7, No. 9, and No. 10 departed Ferrol on 3 August 1931 for a cruise along the northern coast of Spain, where they made various port calls. The cruise included a stop at San Sebastián and then a visit to the Galician estuaries at the end of August 1931.

On 11 July 1932, the Spanish light cruiser Blas de Lezo struck an uncharted rock and sank in the Centollo Pass, a narrow passage off Cape Finisterre on the coast of Galicia. Later in July 1932, B-1, B-3, and the fisheries protection vessel Contramaestre Castelló carried out hydrographic survey work in the Centollo passage to locate the rock that sank Blas de Lezo and any other navigational hazards there.

An order of the Ministry of Navy of 15 August 1934 mandated that the crew size of all six B-class submarines increase from 28 to 34 men. On 16 April 1935, B-1, B-2, B-3, and B-4 were reassigned from the naval base at A Graña to the naval station at Mahón on Menorca in the Balearic Islands.

=== Spanish Civil War, 1936–1939 ===
On 17 July 1936, the Spanish Civil War began, with Nationalist forces under Francisco Franco opposing Republican forces which remained loyal to the Second Spanish Republic. At the time, B-1, B-2, B-3, and B-4 were at Mahón, where B-1 was undergoing repairs. Her commanding officer and executive officer, suspected by their crews of Nationalist sympathies, quickly were arrested and executed at the Mola Fortress, and on 18 July 18 1936, an alférez de navío ship-of-the-line ensign loyal to the Republicans took command of her.

Upon completion of her repairs, B-1 was transferred from Mahón to Cartagena in December 1936. She deployed to Barcelona in January 1937 and carried out patrols from there. She was assigned to Almería in April 1937, then returned to Cartagena on 23 May 1937. In August 1937, she patrolled off Cabo de Gata and Cape Sant Antoni, calling at Alicante in September 1937 and Valencia on 12 September 1937.

On 9 November 1937, B-1 received orders to return to Cartagena. She suffered a mechanical breakdown that forced her to call at Alicante on 10 November, and while at Alicante she collided with a British merchant ship and sustained damage to her bow. Despite these mishaps, she reached Cartagena on 11 November 1937 and underwent repairs. Once repaired, she made several sorties to carry supplies to Mahón, but later in November 1937 she was laid up at Cartagena in a damaged condition for the rest of the war. The war ended on 1 April 1939 in a Nationalist victory and the establishment of Francoist Spain.

=== Francoist Spain ===
The Nationalists took control of B-1 at the Cartagena Naval Base at the end of the civil war. Sources disagree on her subsequent history: According to one, the Francoist regime repaired her, while another claims that she was never seaworthy again. She was decommissioned on 21 October 1941 and Spanish Navy destroyers sank her as a target in 50 metres (164 ft) of water in Alcúdia Bay on the northeastern coast of Mallorca in the Balearic Islands in 1949. The wreck is now a notable dive site.
