= Spanish submarine C-5 =

Spanish Navy submarine of 1929–1936

- Line drawing of a C-class submarine

History

Spain
- Name: C-5
- Builder: SECN, Cartagena, Spain
- Laid down: 10 October 1924
- Launched: 28 October 1929
- Commissioned: 16 April 1930
- Identification: Pennant number C-5
- Fate: Missing 31 December 1936

General characteristics (per Conway's 1922–1946)
- Class & type: C-class submarine
- Displacement: 916 long tons (931 t) surfaced; 1,290 long tons (1,311 t) submerged
- Length: 75.30 m (247 ft)
- Beam: 6.34 m (20 ft10 in)
- Draft: 4.10 m (13 ft 6 in)
- Installed power: 2,000 bhp (1,491 kW) diesel; 750 hp (559 kW) electric
- Propulsion: 2 × Vickers diesel engines; 2 × electric motors; 2 × screws
- Speed: 16 knots (30 km/h; 18 mph) surfaced; 8.5 knots (15.7 km/h; 9.8 mph) submerged
- Range: 4,000 nmi (4,600 mi; 7,400 km) surfaced; 125 nmi (144 mi; 232 km) at 4.5 knots (8.3 km/h; 5.2 mph) submerged
- Test depth: 79 m (260 ft)
- Complement: 46
- Armament: 6 × 533 mm (21 in) torpedo tubes (4 bow, 2 stern); 1 × 75 mm (3.0 in) anti-aircraft gun

General characteristics (per Todoavante))
- Class & type: C-class submarine
- Displacement: 915 long tons (930 t) surfaced; 1,150 long tons (1,168 t) submerged
- Length: 75.3 m (247 ft 1 in)
- Beam: 5.6 m (18 ft 4 in)
- Draft: 5.80 m (19 ft 0 in)
- Depth: 5.64 m (18 ft 6 in)
- Installed power: 2,000 bhp (1,491 kW) diesel; 750 hp (559 kW) electric
- Propulsion: 2 × 1,000 hp (746 kW) diesel engines; 2 × 375 hp (280 kW) electric motors; 2 × screws
- Speed: 16.5 knots (30.6 km/h; 19.0 mph) surfaced; 8.5 knots (15.7 km/h; 9.8 mph) submerged
- Range: 6,800 nmi (7,800 mi; 12,600 km) at 10 knots (19 km/h; 12 mph) surfaced; 3,200 nmi (3,700 mi; 5,900 km) at 16 knots (30 km/h; 18 mph) surfaced; 150 nmi (170 mi; 280 km) at 4.5 knots (8.3 km/h; 5.2 mph) submerged
- Test depth: 80 m (262 ft)
- Complement: 40
- Armament: 6 × 533 mm (21 in) torpedo tubes (4 bow, 2 stern); 10 × Whitehead torpedoes; 1 × 76 mm (3 in) deck gun; 1 × "detachable antiaircraft gun"

C-5 was a C-class submarine of the Spanish Navy commissioned in 1930. She served initially under the Kingdom of Spain, then as a unit of the Spanish Republican Navy under the Second Spanish Republic. She took part in the Spanish Civil War on the side of the Republican faction loyal to the government of the Second Spanish Republic. During the war, she went missing at the end of 1936.

== Construction and commissioning ==
In 1915, the Spanish Cortes Generales passed the Miranda Law, a naval construction program which called for a Spanish Navy force that included 28 submarines. Shortages during World War I (1914–1918) and budgetary limitations led to delays in the program, but a new naval law passed on 11 January 1922 authorized the construction of the six C-class submarines. The Sociedad Española de Construcción Naval (SECN) built all six of the submarines at Cartagena, Spain.

C-5 was the fifth of the class. SECN laid her keel on 10 October 1924 and launched her on 28 October 1929. She was commissioned on 16 April 1930.

== Service history ==
=== Kingdom of Spain, 1929–1931 ===
Upon commissioning, C-5 was assigned to the submarine squadron at Cartagena. In mid-August 1930, all six C-class submarines arrived at Ferrol from Cartagena and then participated in maneuvers in the Cantabrian Sea along the northern coast of Spain during September and October 1930.

=== Second Spanish Republic, 1931–1936 ===
On 14 April 1931, the Second Spanish Republic was proclaimed, replacing the Kingdom of Spain. The Spanish Navy came under the republic's control as the Spanish Republican Navy.

In June 1933, maneuvers began in which C-5, her sister ships C-2, C-3, C-4, and C-6, the submarines B-5 and B-6, four cruisers, nine destroyers, the seaplane carrier Dédalo, and several smaller vessels participated. They concluded on 6 July 1933.) Also in 1933, C-5, her sister ships Isaac Peral (C-1), C-3, and C-4, B-5, and the submarine Narciso Monturiol (A-1) conducted maneuvers off Tarragona. They arrived at Castellón on 29 September 1933 at the end of a voyage from Vinaròs, then got back underway to continue their training cruise, which lasted until the end of October 1933. All six C-class submarines took part in fleet maneuvers during May and June 1934.

On 29 July 1935, the six C-class submarines departed Cartagena to begin a lengthy training cruise. They called at Melilla on the coast of North Africa from 31 July to 3 August and at Cádiz from 5 to 7 August. They then set course for the United Kingdom, reaching Plymouth, England, in mid-August. They subsequently visited Brest in France, Ferrol, and the Canary Islands before proceeding to West Africa, where they called at Dakar in Senegal and Villa Cisneros in Río de Oro. They then returned to the Canary Islands for a stop at Las Palmas on Gran Canaria and called at Larache in Spanish Morocco before concluding the cruise with their arrival at Cartagena in September 1935.

C-5 was one of several submarines that took part in maneuvers in the Canary Islands during the first half of May 1936. She returned to Cartagena upon their completion.

=== Spanish Civil War ===
On 17 July 1936, the Spanish Civil War began, with Nationalist forces under Francisco Franco opposing Republican forces which remained loyal to the Second Spanish Republic. At the time, C-5 was at Cartagena as a unit of the Cartagena division and was in a floating drydock undergoing repairs to one of her electric motors. It quickly became apparent that most of the division's officers supported the Nationalists while the crews supported the Republicans, so the crews mutinied and placed most of the officers under arrest. C-5′s commanding officer was among those arrested; he was relieved of command, imprisoned, and finally executed aboard the prison ship España No. 3 on 15 August 1936. C-5′s executive officer took command of the submarine base at the Cartagena Naval Base, and a "ship′s committee" of sailors considered replacements for the command of C-5. The committee rejected all the proposed officers as pro-Nationalist in their sympathies and chose a boatswain to serve as C-5′s new commanding officer.

C-5 departed Cartagena on 22 August 1936 and set course for Málaga. She made a dive during the voyage and nearly failed to resurface because of the inexperience and incompetence of the officers appointed by the ship's committee. C-5 safely reached Málaga, where she rendezvoused with Isaac Peral, C-2, and C-3. Given C-5′s close brush with disaster during her dive, her ship's committee decided to accept a more experienced officer to command her. On 25 August, the commander of the submarine flotilla at Málaga appointed Capitán de corbeta (Corvette Captain) José María de Lara Dorda to command C-5. Although the ship's committee suspected him of Nationalist sympathies and distrusted him, it accepted him for lack of an alternative, given the number of officers who had been reassigned or executed. A merchant marine officer became C-5′s executive officer, and the radioman who headed the ship's committee retained veto power over any decisions any of the officers made.

On 25 August 1936, C-5 got underway from Málaga bound for Tangier on the coast of North Africa. She ran aground off Tarifa, Spain,on the morning of 26 August — which the ship's committee suspected was an act of sabotage by Nationalist sympathizers — but the rising tide refloated her and she arrived later that morning at Tangier, where she rendezvoused with Isaac Peral and C-2. The three submarines received orders to deploy to the Cantabrian Sea along the northern coast of Spain, and as they left Tangier C-5 collided with Isaac Peral. Isaac Peral sustained hull damage that forced her to divert to Cartagena for repairs, but C-5 continued her voyage to northern Spain, reaching Bilbao on 30 August. She entered dry dock at the Euskalduna shipyard in Bilbao on 31 August to have her hull inspected for damage from the collision with Isaac Peral. With no hull damage found, she left the dry dock on 2 September 1936 and headed for Portugalete.

While on the surface at dawn on 3 September 1936, C-5 sighted the Nationalist armed trawlers Argos and Juan Ignacio about 7 nautical miles (13 kilometres; 8.1 miles) off Luarca, Spain. The ship's committee decided that C-5 should remain on the surface and attack the trawlers with her deck gun. C-5 opened fire at a range of 1,500 metres (1,600 yards) but scored no hits. Juan Ignacio returned fire and Argos closed with C-5 in an attempt to ram her. Because of the poor planning and execution of C-5′s attack, Lara took command of her to try to extricate her from the situation and ordered her to dive. As she did, the Nationalist armed trawlers Denis, Galicia, Tritonia, and Virgen del Carmen joined the action. Lara then ordered C-5 to surface and use her superior speed of almost 17 knots (31 km/h; 20 mph) to escape the trawlers. A Nationalist Savoia-Marchetti SM.62 flying boat based at Marín made an unsuccessful attack on C-5, but maintained contact with her and assisted the trawlers in surrounding the submarine. As the trawlers pursued C-5, the Nationalist destroyer Velasco approached and Lara ordered C-5 to crash-dive. As she passed through a depth of 50 metres (164 feet), she underwent a depth-charge attack, and the explosion of one of the charges caused her to lose propulsion and go into an uncontrolled dive in which she reached a depth of 85 metres (279 feet). She spent almost two days lying on the seabed before effecting repairs that allowed her to return to the surface and reach Bilbao.

In mid-September 1936, C-5 was at sea near Cape Peñas when she received a message indicating the position of the Nationalist light cruiser Almirante Cervera. When she sighted Almirante Cervera, the ship's committee chairman assumed command and ordered Lara to man the periscope because he was the only person aboard with the training and experience to determine the target's range. When the chairman gave the order to fire torpedoes, however, Lara refused because the German light cruiser Königsberg had steamed into a position between C-5 and Almirante Cervera. The committee chairman drew his pistol and attempted to kill Lara in the belief that Lara was a Nationalist sympathizer who had intentionally delayed C-5′s attack so that Königsberg′s presence would make an attack impossible, but C-5′s chief engineer and boatswain intervened to save Lara.

Sometime during the second half of October 1936, a dozen armed men from the Basque Government seized C-5, but returned her to Republican control after negotiations. C-5′s sentry on the night of the takeover, accused of collaborating with the Basques, was placed on trial for his life because of the incident. During his court-martial he threatening the tribunal with revealing the shameful actions and incompetence of the president of the ship's committee, and as a result the court-martial rendered no verdict and the incident thereafter was ignored.

On 30 October 1936, C-5 got underway to attack the Nationalist battleship España, which had been spotted near Cape Mayor. After sighting España, she closed for an attack, and at 13:30 on 31 October she fired two torpedoes, both of which fell short despite being fired at the correct launch distance. C-5 continued to close with España and fired two more torpedoes at close range, but they both missed and exploded off Cape Mayor. C-5 then withdrew and set course for Portugalete.

C-5 departed Bilbao at 19:00 on 31 December 1936 to begin a combat patrol and was never seen or heard from again. On 1 January 1937, fishing vessels discovered an oil slick approximately 11 nautical miles (20 km; 13 mi) north of Ribadesella, suggesting that C-5 had sunk in that area shortly after leaving Bilbao, although her wreck was never located. Testifying during the subsequent investigation into the loss of C-5, a sailor who had disembarked from her a few hours before her final departure stated that she was not seaworthy and that any attempt to submerge would have been very risky.
