= Spanish submarine B-2 =

Spanish Navy submarine of 1922–1941

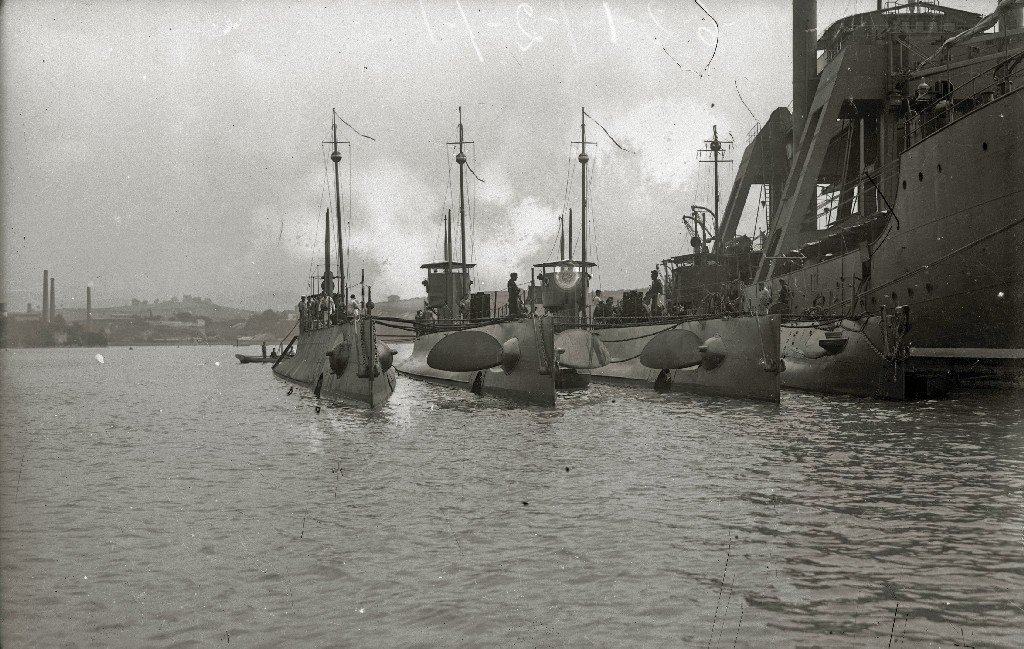
- B-class submarines alongside the submarine rescue ship Kanguro in Pasaia Bay in 1922.

History

Spain
- Name: B-2
- Builder: SECN, Cartagena, Spain
- Laid down: 24 August 1917
- Launched: 10 October 1921
- Commissioned: 1 June 1922
- Decommissioned: 5 April 1951
- Identification: Pennant number B-2
- Fate: Sank ca. 1937–1939; Refloated; Hulked 1940; Sank under tow 28 November 1951

General characteristics (per Conway's 1906–1921)
- Class & type: B-class submarine
- Displacement: 491 long tons (499 t) surfaced; 715 long tons (726 t) submerged
- Length: 62.5 m (205 ft) pp; 64.1 m (210 ft 4 in) oa
- Beam: 5.6 m (17 ft 4 in)
- Draft: 3.4 m (11 ft 3 in)
- Installed power: 1,400 bhp (1,044 kW) diesel; 850 hp (634 kW) electric
- Propulsion: 2 × NELSECO diesel engines; 2 × electric motors; 2 × screws
- Speed: 16 knots (30 km/h; 18 mph) surfaced; 10 knots (19 km/h; 12 mph) submerged
- Range: 8,000 nmi (15,000 km; 9,200 mi) at 10.5 knots (19.4 km/h; 12.1 mph) surfaced; 125 nmi (232 km; 144 mi) at 4.5 knots (8.3 km/h; 5.2 mph) submerged
- Complement: 28
- Armament: 4 × 457 mm (18 in) torpedo tubes (2 bow, 2 stern); 1 × 3 in (76 mm) deck gun

General characteristics (per Todoavante))
- Class & type: B-class submarine
- Displacement: 564 long tons (573 t) surfaced; 716 long tons (727 t) submerged
- Length: 64.18 m (210 ft 7 in)
- Beam: 5.6 m (18 ft 4 in)
- Draft: 3.44 m (11 ft 3 in) (mean)
- Depth: 5.1 m (16 ft 9 in)
- Installed power: 1,400 bhp (1,044 kW) diesel; 420 hp (313 kW) electric
- Propulsion: 2 × 700 hp (522 kW) diesel engines; 2 × 210 hp (157 kW) electric motors; 2 × screws
- Speed: 16.22 knots (30.04 km/h; 18.67 mph) surfaced; 10.5 knots (19.4 km/h; 12.1 mph) submerged
- Range: 2,600 nmi (3,000 mi; 4,800 km) at 16 knots (30 km/h; 18 mph) surfaced; 4,900 nmi (5,600 mi; 9,100 km) at 10.5 knots (19.4 km/h; 12.1 mph) surfaced; 10 nmi (12 mi; 19 km) at 10.5 knots (19.4 km/h; 12.1 mph) submerged; 90 nmi (100 mi; 170 km) at 4.5 knots (8.3 km/h; 5.2 mph) submerged
- Test depth: 60 m (197 ft)
- Complement: As built: 28; From 1934: 34
- Armament: 4 × 450 mm (17.7 in) torpedo tubes (2 bow, 2 stern); 8 × Whitehead X-150 torpedoes; 1 × 76 mm (3 in) antiaircraft gun

B-2 was a Spanish Navy B-class submarine in commission from 1922 to 1951. She served initially under the Kingdom of Spain, seeing service during the Rif War in 1922, then was a unit of the Spanish Republican Navy under the Second Spanish Republic. She took part in the Spanish Civil War on the side of the Republican faction loyal to the government of the Second Spanish Republic. After the war, she became part of the naval forces of Francoist Spain, serving only as a hulk until decommissioned in 1951.

== Construction and commissioning ==
On 15 February 1915, the Spanish Cortes Generales passed the Miranda Law, a naval construction program which called for a Spanish Navy force that included 28 submarines. Shortages during World War I (1914–1918) and budgetary limitations led to delays in the program, and none of the B-class submarines entered service until the 1920s. The Sociedad Española de Construcción Naval (SECN) built all six of the submarines at Cartagena, Spain. Originally, the Spanish Navy planned to name them A-4 through A-9.

B-2 was the second submarine of the class. SECN laid her keel on 24 August 1917 and launched her on 10 October 1921. She was commissioned on 1 June 1922.

== Service history ==
=== Kingdom of Spain, 1922–1931 ===
==== Rif War ====
When B-2 entered service, the Rif War, which pitted Spanish forces against Berber tribes, was raging in the Rif region of Spanish Morocco in North Africa. B-2, her sister ship B-1, and the submarines Isaac Peral (A-0) and A-3 got underway from Cartagena on 20 June 1922 to begin an attempt to resupply the Alhucemas Islands, which lie just off the coast of North Africa and were under siege by Riffian forces. The submarines called at Málaga before getting back underway on 23 June and arriving at the islands that night. They resupplied Peñón de Alhucemas during the night of 23–24 June and withdrew before dawn to head for Melilla on the North African coast. They arrived at Cartagena on 25 June 1922.

On 27 July 1922, B-2, B-1, and the torpedo boat No. 22 conducted a reconnaissance of Peñón de Vélez de la Gomera, which in 1922 still was an islet just off the coast of North Africa, although a 1930 storm created a peninsula which now connects it with the mainland. During the operation, the Riffians opened rifle fire on the Spanish vessels.

==== 1922–1931 ====
By August 1922, the Spanish Navy's submarine flotilla consisted of B-2, her sister ships B-1 and B-3, Isaac Peral, and the three A-class submarines — Narciso Monturiol (A-1), Cosme Garcia (A-2), and A-3. All seven submarines departed Cartagena on 26 August and made for San Sebastián, where in September 1922 they held commemorative events marking the 400th anniversary of the completion of the first circumnavigation of the world, begun in 1519 by the Portuguese explorer Ferdinand Magellan and completed after Magellan's death by the Spanish navigator, shipowner, and explorer Juan Sebastián Elcano in 1522. The Spanish royal family visited the submarine flotilla when it called at Pasajes. After the royal visit, the submarine flotilla conducted exercises and made port calls at Ferrol, Marín, and Vigo. On 25 September 1922, B-1, B-2, B-3, Isaac Peral, Cosme García, A-3, and the tug Cíclope arrived at Cádiz. The same vessels departed Cádiz on 4 October 1922 in company with the submarine rescue ship Kanguro and proceeded to Cartagena.

With King Alfonso XIII observing from aboard the destroyer Villaamil, the submarine flotilla conducted maneuvers in the Mediterranean Sea off Cartagena in March 1923. Later in 1923, the Spanish Navy reorganized its submarine force, creating a submarine division based at Mahón on Menorca in the Balearic Islands made up of Narciso Monturiol and Cosme García and a training division based at Cartagena consisting of B-1, B-2, B-3, B-4, Isaac Peral, and A-3. B-1, B-2, B-3, B-4, and Isaac Peral, carried out a training cruise off Catalonia and in the Balearic Islands between 14 September and 14 October 1923 and called at Alicante in mid-October 1923.

King Alfonso XIII, Queen Victoria Eugenie, and Prime Minister Miguel Primo de Rivera embarked on the battleship Jaime I on 15 November 1923 and departed for Italy on 16 November accompanied by the Trasmediterránea mail steamer Rey Jaime I — which was carrying the royal entourage — and escorted by B-1, B-2, B-3, B-4, the battleship Alfonso XIII, the light cruiser Reina Victoria Eugenia, and the destroyers Cadarso and Villaamil. The royal family disembarked at La Spezia, Italy. On 21 November, the squadron anchored at Naples, Italy. After the completion of the royal visit, the squadron returned to Spain, arriving at Barcelona on 1 December and at Cartagena on 14 December 1923.

In early September 1924, B-2 and B-4 got underway from the Balearic Islands for a deployment to the coast of Spanish Morocco, where the Rif War continued to rage.

During 1927, B-2, B-3, and B-4 joined the Ferrol submarine division based at A Graña, which previously had consisted only of B-1 and Isaac Peral. In August and September 1928, B-1, B-2, B-3, B-4, and the submarines B-5, B-6, C-1, and C-2 carried out maneuvers in the Cantabrian Sea along the northern coast of Spain. In October and November 1928, all eight of the submarines conducted maneuvers in the Mediterranean Sea under the overall command of Capitán de navío (Ship-of-the-Line Captain) Mateo García de los Reyes, a future contralmirante (counter admiral) and minister of the navy. During the maneuvers, García de los Reyes's flagship, the troopship Almirante Lobo, arrived at Palma de Mallorca on Mallorca in the Balearic Islands at midnight on 2 November 1928, and the eight submarines, as well as the submarine Isaac Peral, subsequently anchored there as well. With Isaac Peral as its flagship, the submarine squadron called at Barcelona from 11 November until the morning of 20 November 1928 for a crew rest period.

In May 1929, all six B-class submarines as well as C-1, C-2, and their sister ship C-3 attended the 1929 Barcelona International Exposition, arriving in Barcelona a few days before the exposition officially opened on 19 May. They remained at Barcelona until the last week of May. Accompanied by the tug Galicia, B-1, B-2, B-3, and B-4 anchored at Ferrol at the end of July 1929 to again form the Ferrol submarine division based at A Graña. B-2 took part in the annual squadron maneuvers in the Mediterranean Sea between mid-September and mid-October 1929, arriving in Barcelona in mid-October 1929 for a crew rest period.

B-1, B-2, B-3, and B-4 began repairs at the Ferrol dockyard on 25 April 1930. On 5 June 1930, the four submarines got underway from Ferrol to begin a cruise along the northern coast of Spain, during which they visited several ports. They took part in maneuvers in the Cantabrian Sea off the northern coast of Spain in September and October 1930.

=== Second Spanish Republic, 1931–1936 ===
On 14 April 1931, the Second Spanish Republic was proclaimed, replacing the Kingdom of Spain. The Spanish Navy came under the republic's control as the Spanish Republican Navy.

B-2 departed Ferrol in company with B-4 bound for Bilbao, which the two submarines reached on 7 May 1931. On 9 May, they departed Bilbao and set course for Pasajes. Both submarines got underway from Santander on the morning of 12 May 1931 to conduct maneuvers, and after completing them returned to Santander that afternoon. B-1, B-2, B-4 and the torpedo boats No. 2, No. 7, No. 9, and No. 10 departed Ferrol on 3 August 1931 for a cruise along the northern coast of Spain, where they made various port calls. The cruise included a stop at San Sebastián and then a visit to the Galician estuaries at the end of August 1931. B-2, B-3, B-4, and the torpedo boats No. 9 and No. 10 departed Ferrol on 10 September 1931 for another training cruise along Spain's northern coast, reaching Bilbao on 15 September.

On 11 July 1932, B-2, B-3, five cruisers, and four destroyers were taking part in maneuvers when the light cruiser Blas de Lezo struck an uncharted rock and sank in the Centollo Pass, a narrow passage off Cape Finisterre on the coast of Galicia. On 21 July 1933, Teniente de navío (Ship-of-the-Line Lieutenant) José Nieto Antúnez, a future almirante and minister of the navy, took command of B-2. An order of the Ministry of Navy of 15 August 1934 mandated that the crew size of all six B-class submarines increase from 28 to 34 men.

On 16 April 1935, B-1, B-2, B-3, and B-4 were reassigned from the naval base at A Graña to the naval station at Mahón on Menorca in the Balearic Islands. In early July 1936, B-2, B-3, B-4, and the water tanker A-3 conducted a cruise around the Balearic Islands.

=== Spanish Civil War, 1936–1939 ===
On 17 July 1936, the Spanish Civil War began, with Nationalist forces under Francisco Franco opposing Republican forces which remained loyal to the Second Spanish Republic. At the time, B-2, B-3, and B-4 were at Sóller on Mallorca in the Balearic Islands. The three submarines anchored at Pollensa on the northern coast of Mallorca on the afternoon of 18 July, and they arrived in company with the water tanker A-3 at Mahón on the morning of 20 July 1936. Early on 21 July, B-2 got underway for Valencia, but her crew mutinied and forced her to return to Mahón. There her commanding officer and executive officer, suspected of harboring Nationalist sympathies, were arrested along with the other submarine commanders. They were murdered at the Mola Fortress on 3 August 1936.

Meanwhile, a boatswain took command of B-2, and she joined B-3 and B-4 in patrolling the waters around Republican-held Menorca until the end of July 1936 to intercept any Nationalist attempt to invade the island from neighboring Mallorca. Operating as a surface ship between 16 August and 4 September 1936, she took part in an unsuccessful Republican attempt to make an amphibious landing at Porto Cristo on the eastern coast of Nationalist-held Mallorca.

An alférez de navío (ship-of-the-line ensign) took command of B-2 in September 1936, and between late December 1936 and mid-January 1937 she carried out several patrols off Cartagena. In March 1937, she began operating from Almería. She returned to Cartagena on 23 May 1937. She moved back to Almería on 31 May 1937, where aircraft of the German Condor Legion made a bombing attack on her.

Subsequently, B-2 made some supply runs between the Spanish mainland and Mahón. Thereafter she remained in Cartagena in an inoperable condition due to damage. She was abandoned and eventually sank at Cartagena Naval Base; some sources claim that Republican forces scuttled her there in 1939. The war ended on 1 April 1939 in a Nationalist victory and the establishment of Francoist Spain.

=== Francoist Spain ===
The victorious Nationalists took possession of B-2 at the Cartagena Naval Base in April 1939. She was refloated but was never again seaworthy, and the Spanish Navy placed her in service as a training hulk at the Ferrol School of Mechanics in June 1940. She was converted into a floating power plant in September 1948.

Although sources agree that B-2 was sold for scrapping, they otherwise provide different accounts of B-2′s final disposition. One source claims that she was scrapped,, and another specifies that she was scrapped in 1948. However, another source claims that B-2 was decommissioned on 5 April 1951, then was sold for scrapping, but sank in a storm in the Cantabrian Sea off the northern coast of Spain on 28 November 1951 while under tow to a shipbreaker in Avilés by the tug Cíclope.
