= Spanish submarine C-4 =

Spanish Navy submarine of 1929–1946

- Line drawing of a C-class submarine

History

Spain
- Name: C-4
- Builder: SECN, Cartagena, Spain
- Laid down: 5 May 1924
- Launched: 6 July 1929
- Commissioned: 21 September 1929
- Identification: Pennant number C-4
- Fate: Sunk in collision 27 June 1946

General characteristics (per Conway's 1922–1946)
- Class & type: C-class submarine
- Displacement: 916 long tons (931 t) surfaced; 1,290 long tons (1,311 t) submerged
- Length: 75.30 m (247 ft)
- Beam: 6.34 m (20 ft10 in)
- Draft: 4.10 m (13 ft 6 in)
- Installed power: 2,000 bhp (1,491 kW) diesel; 750 hp (559 kW) electric
- Propulsion: 2 × Vickers diesel engines; 2 × electric motors; 2 × screws
- Speed: 16 knots (30 km/h; 18 mph) surfaced; 8.5 knots (15.7 km/h; 9.8 mph) submerged
- Range: 4,000 nmi (4,600 mi; 7,400 km) surfaced; 125 nmi (144 mi; 232 km) at 4.5 knots (8.3 km/h; 5.2 mph) submerged
- Test depth: 79 m (260 ft)
- Complement: 46
- Armament: 6 × 533 mm (21 in) torpedo tubes (4 bow, 2 stern); 1 × 75 mm (3.0 in) anti-aircraft gun

General characteristics (per Todoavante))
- Class & type: C-class submarine
- Displacement: 915 long tons (930 t) surfaced; 1,150 long tons (1,168 t) submerged
- Length: 75.3 m (247 ft 1 in)
- Beam: 5.6 m (18 ft 4 in)
- Draft: 5.80 m (19 ft 0 in)
- Depth: 5.64 m (18 ft 6 in)
- Installed power: 2,000 bhp (1,491 kW) diesel; 750 hp (559 kW) electric
- Propulsion: 2 × 1,000 hp (746 kW) diesel engines; 2 × 375 hp (280 kW) electric motors; 2 × screws
- Speed: 16.5 knots (30.6 km/h; 19.0 mph) surfaced; 8.5 knots (15.7 km/h; 9.8 mph) submerged
- Range: 6,800 nmi (7,800 mi; 12,600 km) at 10 knots (19 km/h; 12 mph) surfaced; 3,200 nmi (3,700 mi; 5,900 km) at 16 knots (30 km/h; 18 mph) surfaced; 150 nmi (170 mi; 280 km) at 4.5 knots (8.3 km/h; 5.2 mph) submerged
- Test depth: 80 m (262 ft)
- Complement: 40
- Armament: 6 × 533 mm (21 in) torpedo tubes (4 bow, 2 stern); 10 × Whitehead torpedoes; 1 × 76 mm (3 in) deck gun; 1 × "detachable antiaircraft gun"

C-4 was a C-class submarine of the Spanish Navy commissioned in 1929. She served initially under the Kingdom of Spain, then as a unit of the Spanish Republican Navy under the Second Spanish Republic. She took part in the Spanish Civil War on the side of the Republican faction loyal to the government of the Second Spanish Republic. After the war, she became part of the naval forces of Francoist Spain. She was sunk in a collision in 1946.

== Construction and commissioning ==
In 1915, the Spanish Cortes Generales passed the Miranda Law, a naval construction program which called for a Spanish Navy force that included 28 submarines. Shortages during World War I (1914–1918) and budgetary limitations led to delays in the program, but a new naval law passed on 11 January 1922 authorized the construction of the six C-class submarines. The Sociedad Española de Construcción Naval (SECN) built all six of the submarines at Cartagena, Spain.

C-4 was the fourth of the class. SECN laid her keel on 5 May 1924 and launched her on 6 July 1929. She was commissioned on 21 September 1929.

== Service history ==
=== Kingdom of Spain, 1929–1931 ===
Upon commissioning, C-4 was assigned to the submarine squadron at Cartagena. She and her sister ships C-1, C-2, and C-3 took part in fleet maneuvers in the Mediterranean Sea during September and October 1929. In mid-August 1930, all six C-class submarines — the last two vessels of the class, C-5 and C-6, having joined the fleet during 1930 — arrived at Ferrol from Cartagena and then participated in maneuvers in the Cantabrian Sea along the northern coast of Spain during September and October 1930.

=== Second Spanish Republic, 1931–1936 ===
On 14 April 1931, the Second Spanish Republic was proclaimed, replacing the Kingdom of Spain. The Spanish Navy came under the republic's control as the Spanish Republican Navy.

In June 1933, maneuvers began in which C-4, C-2, C-3, C-5, C-6, the submarines B-5 and B-6, four cruisers, nine destroyers, the seaplane carrier Dédalo, and several smaller vessels participated. They concluded on 6 July 1933.) Also in 1933, C-4, Isaac Peral (the former C-1), C-3, C-5, B-5, and the submarine Narciso Monturiol (A-1) conducted maneuvers off Tarragona. They arrived at Castellón on 29 September 1933 at the end of a voyage from Vinaròs, then got back underway to continue their training cruise, which lasted until the end of October 1933. All six C-class submarines took part in fleet maneuvers during May and June 1934.

On 29 July 1935, the six C-class submarines departed Cartagena to begin a lengthy training cruise. They called at Melilla on the coast of North Africa from 31 July to 3 August and at Cádiz from 5 to 7 August. They then set course for the United Kingdom, reaching Plymouth, England, in mid-August. They subsequently visited Brest in France, Ferrol, and the Canary Islands before proceeding to West Africa, where they called at Dakar in Senegal and Villa Cisneros in Río de Oro. They then returned to the Canary Islands for a stop at Las Palmas on Gran Canaria and called at Larache in Spanish Morocco before concluding the cruise with their arrival at Cartagena in September 1935.

C-4 was one of several submarines that took part in maneuvers in the Canary Islands during the first half of May 1936. She returned to Cartagena upon their completion.

=== Spanish Civil War, 1936–1939 ===
On 17 July 1936, the Spanish Civil War began, with Nationalist forces under Francisco Franco opposing Republican forces which remained loyal to the Second Spanish Republic. At the time, C-4 was at Cartagena as a unit of the Cartagena division. Early on 18 July, the division received orders from the Republican government to patrol the Mediterranean along the Andalusian coast between Cabo de Gata and the Strait of Gibraltar to intercept ships carrying Nationalist troops and equipment from North Africa to Spain. C-4, Isaac Peral, C-4, and C-6 got underway immediately, rendezvoused at sea with the submarine B-6, and began the patrol.

It quickly became apparent that most of the division's officers supported the Nationalists while the crews supported the Republicans, so the crews mutinied and placed most of the officers under arrest. Only two days into the operation, on 20 July, the submarine division entered the harbor at Málaga, where the division's commander, Capitán de fragata (Frigate Captain) Francisco Guimerá Bosch, and most of the other senior officers in the division — including C-4′s commanding officer. — were relieved of command and imprisoned on the prison ship Monte Toro. Only the commanding officer of Isaac Peral retained his command. Isaac Peral′s former executive officer took command of C-4, and C-4′s former commanding officer later was executed.

C-4 soon resumed the patrol off Andalusia. She saw her first combat action of the war on the night of 26–27 July 1936, when she attacked two merchant ships crossing the Strait of Gibraltar, firing a torpedo and 37 rounds from her deck gun without scoring a hit. Subsequently, she received orders to proceed to Spain's northern coast, but Nationalist coastal artillery damaged her while she was off Huelva. Aborting her voyage to northern Spain, she made port at Tangier on the coast of North Africa. She then proceeded to Málaga to transfer her torpedoes and ammunition to C-3, then proceeded to Cartagena, where she spent about 20 days while undergoing repairs.

After the completion of her repairs, C-4 got underway from Cartagena in company with C-5 on 22 August 1936 bound for Málaga, which the submarines reached on 23 August. C-4, C-3, and C-5 departed Málaga on 25 August bound for the Bilbao carrying a large quantity of weapons and ammunition for Republican forces fighting in northern Spain. They arrived at Bilbao on 29 August and unloaded their cargo. She conducted patrols from Bilbao, but had no successes. On 2 October 1936 they put back to sea and set course for Málaga, which C-4 and C-3 reached on 8 October.

C-4 arrived at Málaga on 8 November 1936 and conducted patrols in the Alboran Sea from there until the end of 1936. At the beginning of 1937, she shifted her base to Valencia and began patrols off Spain's Levante coast. On 30 March 1937 C-4 and Isaac Peral departed Cartagena to intercept troopships bringing troops of the Italian Corpo Truppe Volontarie (Corps of Volunteer Troops) to Spain from Fascist Italy, which actively supported the Nationalist faction. The submarines had no success, and they returned to Cartagena early in April 1937. On 13 April 1937, the two submarines got back underway with orders to deploy to the northern coast of Spain, but Isaac Peral suffered a mechanical breakdown in her diesel engines as the submarines neared the Strait of Gibraltar, forcing her to return to Cartagena. C-4 aborted her voyage to northern Spain to escort Isaac Peral back to Cartagena.

At the end of April 1937, C-4 again departed for the northern coast of Spain. On 9 May 1937, she arrived at Bilbao, where she rendezvoused with C-2 and C-6. When Bilbao fell to Nationalist forces, C-4 and C-6 moved first to Santander and then to the Port of El Musel at Gijón. While at sea onn 21 June 1937, C-4 sighted the Nationalist light cruiser Almirante Cervera. C-4 was unable to make an attack and was driven off by a depth charges. She withdrew and returned to Santander.

When the fall of Santander to Nationalist forces became imminent, C-4 embarked Republican military officers and politicians requiring evacuation and moved from Santander to Gijón on 25 August 1937. She rendezvoused with C-2 and C-6 at Gijón. Nationalist ships bombarded the Port of El Musel on 28 August 1937, and C-4 sustained damage from numerous shrapnel hits. The bombardment prompted C-4 and C-2 to flee to France that day, where C-4 anchored at Le Verdon-sur-Mer on 29 August without permission from Republican authorities and C-2 moored at Brest. During their stay in France, the commanding officers of the two submarines defected to the Nationalists and conspired to seize control of either C-2 alone or both submarines — according to different sources — in collaboration with Nationalist agents and place them under Nationalist control, but the attempt failed and they were relieved of command.

The Soviet Union supported the Republicans, and a Soviet Navy officer took command of C-4 on 18 December 1937. C-4 underwent repairs in France, and after their completion departed Bordeaux on 14 April 1938 and headed for Cartagena, which she reached on 23 April. There a different Soviet Navy officer took command of her, and — after post-repair trials and preparations to return to combat — on 19 June 1938 she departed Cartagena and proceeded to Barcelona, where she arrived on 21 June. Based at Barcelona, she conducted several patrols along the coast of Catalonia. She headed for Mahón on Menorca in the Balearic Islands on 15 July 1938, then returned to Barcelona on 21 July. She again got underway from Barcelona on 26 July 1938 to escort an approaching merchant ship into port.

Republican-held Menorca in the Balearic Islands was under blockade by Nationalist naval forces, but Republican submarines found they could rather easily run the blockade. C-4 departed Barcelona on 12 August 1938 to deliver mail to Mahón on Menorca, then returned to Barcelona on 18 August, becoming the first submarine in history to transport mail between Barcelona and Mahón. Following that, she proceeded to Cartagena, where she arrived on 20 August 1938; one source claims that she completed her second and final mail run to Mahón by that date. C-4 got underway from Cartagena on 23 August 1938 in company with C-2, and the two submarines patrolled in the Cape Palos area off Cartagena until September 1938.

C-4 entered drydock for repairs at Cartagena on 12 September 1938. She began post-repair sea trials on 23 December 1938, but ran aground. Due to several complaints about the incompetence of her Soviet commanding officer, a Spanish officer relieved him of command on 27 December 1938. She had suffered additional damage and underwent further repairs at Cartagena Naval Base. Once again seaworthy, she began a patrol between Barcelona and Cape Tortosa on 9 January 1939, completing it with her return to Cartagena on 14 January. Over the next few weeks, she made only a few sorties, and none lasting more than a few hours.

With the Nationalists close to victory in the civil war, C-4 was part of a Spanish Republican Navy squadron that fled Cartagena on the morning of 5 March 1939 to seek refuge at Bizerte in Tunisia, which it reached on 7 March. The Republican ships remained there through the end of the war on 1 April 1939.

=== Francoist Spain, 1939–1946 ===
At the beginning of April 1939, representatives of the victorious Nationalists arrived at Bizerte to take possession of the Spanish ships there. With a new commanding officer and crew, C-4 departed Bizerte with the rest of the squadron on 2 April 1939 and arrived at Cádiz on 5 April.

C-4 subsequently was part of the naval forces of Francoist Spain, which put her in full commission on 12 May 1939. However, the economic hardship Spain faced in the aftermath of its civil war combined with the outbreak in September 1939 of World War II — although Spain remained neutral in the conflict — made naval operations difficult for Spanish forces. As a result, C-4 spent most of the World War II years in port.

The conclusion of World War II in 1945 allowed C-4 to resume active operations. With Caudillo of Spain Francisco Franco aboard, she took part in a ceremony on 20 April 1946 in honor of the 1,476 Nationalist troops killed aboard the steamer SS Castillo de Olite during the Cartagena uprising in 1939.

In June 1946, C-4 participated in naval maneuvers off Sóller on Mallorca in the Balearic Islands with C-2, the submarine General Sanjurjo, and the destroyers Alcalá Galiano, Churruca, and Lepanto. The maneuvers simulated the submrines intercepting an "enemy" force portrayed by the three destroyers. On 27 June, C-2 became the first of the submarines to make contact with the destroyers. C-2 transmitted the position of the destroyers to the other two submarines, then submerged, conducted a simulated attack, surfaced, and headed toward Sóller. Plans called for C-4 to do the same, but at approximately 14:00 — with the destroyers steaming in line ahead and Lepanto at the rear of the line — C-4 surfaced a few meters off Lepanto′s port bow. Neither vessel had time to take evasive action, and Lepanto rammed C-4, nearly breaking her in two. C-4 sank within seconds with the loss of her entire crew of 44.
