= Spanish C-class submarine =

Spanish Navy submarine class

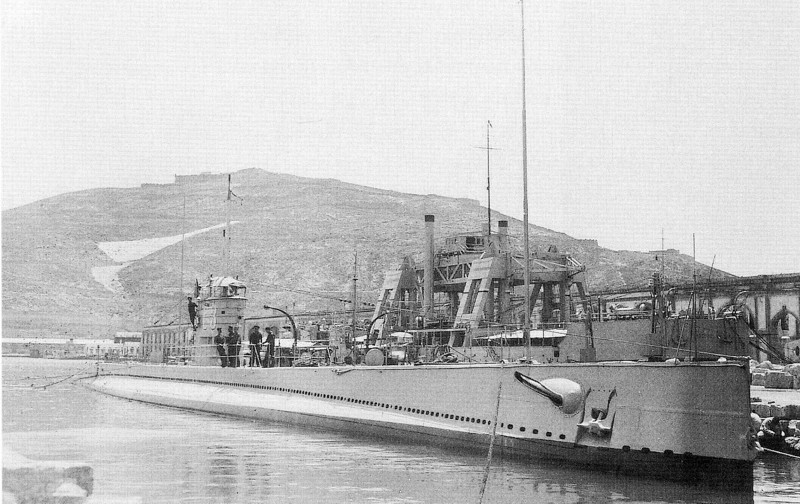
- C-3 alongside the submarine rescue ship Kanguro at Cartagena Naval Base in Cartagena, Spain.

Class overview
- Name: C class
- Builders: SECN, Cartagena, Spain
- Operators: Spanish Navy (1928–1931, 1939–1951); Spanish Republican Navy (1931–1939)
- Preceded by: B class
- Succeeded by: Foca class
- Built: 1923–1930
- In commission: 1928–1951
- Completed: 6
- Lost: 4

General characteristics (per Conway's 1922–1946)
- Class & type: C-class submarine
- Displacement: 916 long tons (931 t) surfaced; 1,290 long tons (1,311 t) submerged
- Length: 75.30 m (247 ft)
- Beam: 6.34 m (20 ft 10 in)
- Draft: 4.10 m (13 ft 6 in)
- Installed power: 2,000 bhp (1,491 kW) diesel; 750 hp (559 kW) electric
- Propulsion: 2 × Vickers diesel engines; 2 × electric motors; 2 × screws
- Speed: 16 knots (30 km/h; 18 mph) surfaced; 8.5 knots (15.7 km/h; 9.8 mph) submerged
- Range: 4,000 nmi (4,600 mi; 7,400 km) surfaced; 125 nmi (144 mi; 232 km) at 4.5 knots (8.3 km/h; 5.2 mph) submerged
- Test depth: 79 m (260 ft)
- Complement: 46
- Armament: 6 × 533 mm (21 in) torpedo tubes (4 bow, 2 stern); 1 × 75 mm (3.0 in) anti-aircraft gun

General characteristics (per Todoavante))
- Class & type: C-class submarine
- Displacement: 915 long tons (930 t) surfaced; 1,150 long tons (1,168 t) submerged
- Length: 75.3 m (247 ft 1 in)
- Beam: 5.6 m (18 ft 4 in)
- Draft: 5.80 m (19 ft 0 in)
- Depth: 5.64 m (18 ft 6 in)
- Installed power: 2,000 bhp (1,491 kW) diesel; 750 hp (559 kW) electric
- Propulsion: 2 × 1,000 hp (746 kW) diesel engines; 2 × 375 hp (280 kW) electric motors; 2 × screws
- Speed: 16.5 knots (30.6 km/h; 19.0 mph) surfaced; 8.5 knots (15.7 km/h; 9.8 mph) submerged
- Range: 6,800 nmi (7,800 mi; 12,600 km) at 10 knots (19 km/h; 12 mph) surfaced; 3,200 nmi (3,700 mi; 5,900 km) at 16 knots (30 km/h; 18 mph) surfaced; 150 nmi (170 mi; 280 km) at 4.5 knots (8.3 km/h; 5.2 mph) submerged
- Test depth: 80 m (262 ft)
- Complement: 40
- Armament: 6 × 533 mm (21 in) torpedo tubes (4 bow, 2 stern); 10 × Whitehead torpedoes; 1 × 76 mm (3 in) deck gun; 1 × "detachable antiaircraft gun"

The C-class submarines were a class of six submarines built for the Spanish Navy between 1923 and 1930. They entered service between 1928 and 1930. All six served in the Spanish Republican Navy in the Spanish Civil War (1936–1939), in which three were lost. The survivors were incorporated into the navy of Francoist Spain, and the last of them was decommissioned in 1951.

== Description ==
A line drawing of C-1 in 1928. She was renamed Isaac Peral in 1930.

The Sociedad Española de Construcción Naval (SECN) built the C-class submarines to a Holland design under license from the Electric Boat Company. The C-class submarines were enlarged and improved versions of the preceding B class, with larger torpedo tubes — 533 mm (21 in), in contrast to the 450 mm (17.7 in) tubes of the B class — and two more bow tubes than the B class. They had a lower submerged top speed than the B class.

Sources agree that the C-class submarines were 75.3 metres (247 ft 1 in) long, but disagree on their other dimensions, describing their beam as 6.34 metres (20 ft 10 in) and as 5.6 metres (18 ft 4 in) and their draft as 4.10 metres (13 ft 5 in) and as 5.8 metres (19 ft 0 in). On the surface they displaced 915 long tons (930 t) or 916 long tons (931 t). Sources describe their submerged displacement differently, asserting that it was 1,150 long tons (1,168 t) and that it was 1,290 long tons (1,311 t).

Two 1,000 bhp (746 kW) Vickers diesel engines driving two screws gave the C-class submarines a top speed on the surface of 16 knots (30 km/h; 18 mph) or 16.5 knots (30.6 km/h; 19.0 mph), according to different sources. Their two 375 hp (280 kW) electric motors gave them a maximum submerged speed of 8.5 knots (15.7 km/h; 9.8 mph). Sources describe their range on the surface in various ways — as 4,000 nmi (4,600 mi; 7,400 km) without specifying a speed, as 6,800 nmi (7,800 mi; 12,600 km) at 10 knots (19 km/h; 12 mph), and as 3,200 nmi (3,700 mi; 5,900 km) at 16 knots (30 km/h; 18 mph). Submerged, they had a range at 4.5 knots (8.3 km/h; 5.2 mph) of either 125 nmi (144 mi; 232 km) or 150 nmi (170 mi; 280 km).

Each C-class submarine had six 533 mm (21 in) torpedo tubes — four in the bow and two in the stern — and carried ten Whitehead torpedoes. Sources disagree on their other armament: One credits them with a 75 mm (3 in) antiaircraft gun, while another states that they had a 76 mm (3 in) deck gun and a "detachable antiaircraft gun."

The C-class submarines had a crew of either 40 or 46, according to different sources. They had a diving depth of 80 metres (262 feet).

== Service ==
The C-class submarines entered service in the Spanish Navy between 1928 and 1930. They served under the Kingdom of Spain until 1931, then under the Second Spanish Republic in the Spanish Republican Navy. In 1930, C-1 was renamed Isaac Peral in honor of the Spanish submarine pioneer of that name, but retained "C-1" as her pennant number. The other five submarines never received names.

The Spanish Civil War broke out on 17 July 1936, and all six of the submarines remained under the control of the Republican faction during the conflict. Two were lost in December 1936, when the German submarine U-34 sank C-3 while supporting the Nationalists in Operation Ursula on 12 December and C-5 was never seen or heard from again after putting to sea on 31 December. In October 1937, C-6 was scuttled to avoid capture by the Nationalists. She was refloated in 1947, but sank while under tow to the breakers.

After the war ended in 1939, the three surviving submarines were incorporated into the naval forces of Francoist Spain. C-4 sank with the loss of all hands after a collision with the destroyer Lepanto during naval exercises in the Balearic Islands in 1946. The other two were decommissioned, Isaac Peral in 1948 and C-2 in 1951. Isaac Peral was sunk as a target in 1951, and C-2 sank while under tow to the breakers that year.

== Submarines of the class ==
The six submarines of the C class were:

Ship name	Builder	Laid down	Launched	Commissioned	Decommissioned	Fate
Isaac Peral (C-1)	SECN, Cartagena, Spain	19 July 1923	31 March 1927	18 July 1928	August 1948	Sunk as target 1951
C-2	SECN, Cartagena, Spain	15 September 1923	4 March 1928	19 July 1928	June 1951	Sank under tow to breakers
C-3	SECN, Cartagena, Spain	5 May 1924	20 February 1929	4 May 1929	—N/a	Sunk 12 December 1936
C-4	SECN, Cartagena, Spain	5 May 1924	6 July 1929	21 September 1929	—N/a	Sunk in collision 27 June 1946
C-5	SECN, Cartagena, Spain	10 October 1924	28 October 1929	16 April 1930	—N/a	Missing after 31 December 1936
C-6	SECN, Cartagena, Spain	12 February 1925	26 December 1929	27 September 1930	—N/a	Scuttled 20 October 1937; refloated November 1947; sank under tow to breakers

== See also ==
- List of historic Spanish Navy ships
- List of submarines of the Spanish Navy
