= SECN =

SECN may refer to:

- SEC Network, an American multinational sports network
- Sociedad Española de Construcción Naval (Spanish Society for Naval Construction), an Anglo-Spanish shipbuilding conglomerate later nationalized by Francoist Spain
