= Spanish submarine B-6 =

Spanish Navy submarine of 1925–1936

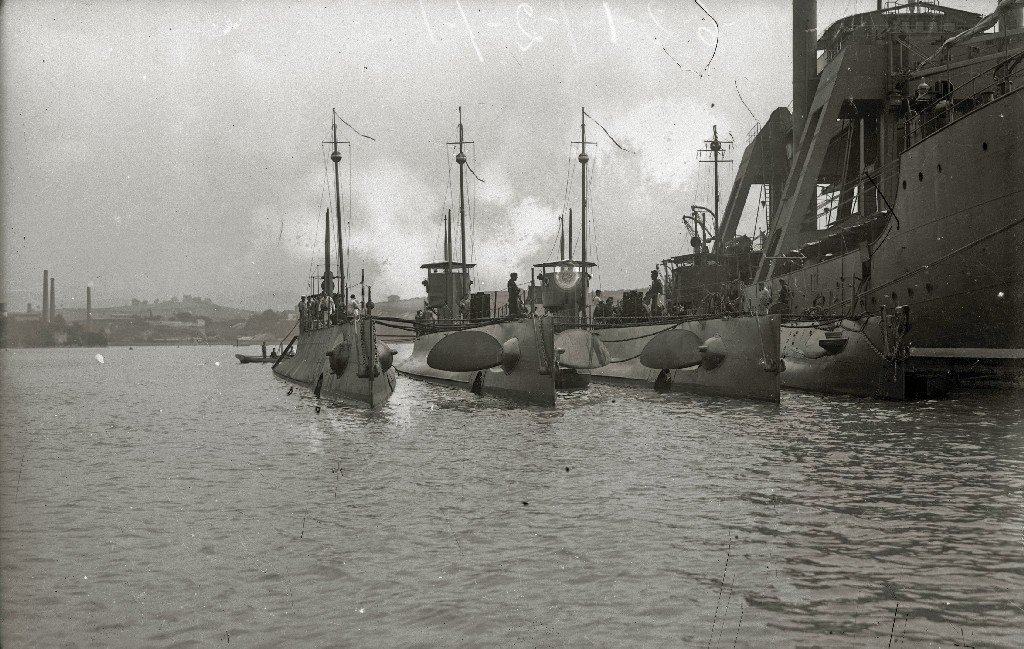
- B-class submarines alongside the submarine rescue ship Kanguro in Pasaia Bay in 1922.

History

Spain
- Name: B-6
- Builder: SECN, Cartagena, Spain
- Laid down: 5 September 1921
- Launched: 13 January 1923
- Commissioned: 21 January 1926
- Identification: Pennant number B-6
- Fate: Sunk 19 September 1936

General characteristics (per Conway's 1906–1921)
- Class & type: B-class submarine
- Displacement: 491 long tons (499 t) surfaced; 715 long tons (726 t) submerged
- Length: 62.5 m (205 ft) pp; 64.1 m (210 ft 4 in) oa
- Beam: 5.6 m (17 ft 4 in)
- Draft: 3.4 m (11 ft 3 in)
- Installed power: 1,400 bhp (1,044 kW) diesel; 850 hp (634 kW) electric
- Propulsion: 2 × NELSECO diesel engines; 2 × electric motors; 2 × screws
- Speed: 16 knots (30 km/h; 18 mph) surfaced; 10 knots (19 km/h; 12 mph) submerged
- Range: 8,000 nmi (15,000 km; 9,200 mi) at 10.5 knots (19.4 km/h; 12.1 mph) surfaced; 125 nmi (232 km; 144 mi) at 4.5 knots (8.3 km/h; 5.2 mph) submerged
- Complement: 28
- Armament: 4 × 457 mm (18 in) torpedo tubes (2 bow, 2 stern); 1 × 3 in (76 mm) deck gun

General characteristics (per Todoavante))
- Class & type: B-class submarine
- Displacement: 564 long tons (573 t) surfaced; 716 long tons (727 t) submerged
- Length: 64.18 m (210 ft 7 in)
- Beam: 5.6 m (18 ft 4 in)
- Draft: 3.44 m (11 ft 3 in) (mean)
- Depth: 5.1 m (16 ft 9 in)
- Installed power: 1,400 bhp (1,044 kW) diesel; 420 hp (313 kW) electric
- Propulsion: 2 × 700 hp (522 kW) diesel engines; 2 × 210 hp (157 kW) electric motors; 2 × screws
- Speed: 16.22 knots (30.04 km/h; 18.67 mph) surfaced; 10.5 knots (19.4 km/h; 12.1 mph) submerged
- Range: 2,600 nmi (3,000 mi; 4,800 km) at 16 knots (30 km/h; 18 mph) surfaced; 4,900 nmi (5,600 mi; 9,100 km) at 10.5 knots (19.4 km/h; 12.1 mph) surfaced; 10 nmi (12 mi; 19 km) at 10.5 knots (19.4 km/h; 12.1 mph) submerged; 90 nmi (100 mi; 170 km) at 4.5 knots (8.3 km/h; 5.2 mph) submerged
- Test depth: 60 m (197 ft)
- Complement: As built: 28; From 1934: 34
- Armament: 4 × 450 mm (17.7 in) torpedo tubes (2 bow, 2 stern); 8 × Whitehead X-150 torpedoes; 1 × 76 mm (3 in) antiaircraft gun

B-6 was a Spanish Navy B-class submarine in commissioned in 1926. She served initially under the Kingdom of Spain, then was a unit of the Spanish Republican Navy under the Second Spanish Republic. She took part in the Spanish Civil War on the side of the Republican faction loyal to the government of the Second Spanish Republic. She was sunk in 1936.

== Construction and commissioning ==
On 15 February 1915, the Spanish Cortes Generales passed the Miranda Law, a naval construction program which called for a Spanish Navy force that included 28 submarines. Shortages during World War I (1914–1918) and budgetary limitations led to delays in the program, and none of the B-class submarines entered service until the 1920s. The Sociedad Española de Construcción Naval (SECN) built all six of the submarines at Cartagena, Spain. Originally, the Spanish Navy planned to name them A-4 through A-9.

B-6 was the sixth and final submarine of the class. SECN laid her keel on 5 September 1921 and launched her on 13 January 1923. She was commissioned on 21 January 1926.

== Service history ==
=== Kingdom of Spain, 1926–1931 ===
B-6 set a world record for submerged endurance in March 1927, remaining submerged in the Mediterranean Sea off Cartagena for 72 hours. King Alfonso XIII and Queen Victoria Eugenie embarked on the battleship Jaime I at Bilbao on 22 August 1927 and began a cruise escorted by several Spanish Navy vessels including B-6 and the submarines B-3 and B-4. The cruise took the vessels to Galicia and Algeciras on the coast of Spain and then — after departing Algeciras on 5 October 1927 — to North Africa, where they stopped at Ceuta, Alhucemas, Villa Sanjurjo, and Melilla.

In August and September 1928, B-6, her sister ships B-1, B-2, B-3, B-4, and B-5, and the submarines C-1 and C-2 carried out maneuvers in the Cantabrian Sea along the northern coast of Spain. In October and November 1928, all eight of the submarines conducted maneuvers in the Mediterranean Sea under the overall command of Capitán de navío (Ship-of-the-Line Captain) Mateo García de los Reyes, a future contralmirante (counter admiral) and minister of the navy. During the maneuvers, García de los Reyes's flagship, the troopship Almirante Lobo, arrived at Palma de Mallorca on Mallorca in the Balearic Islands at midnight on 2 November 1928, and the eight submarines, as well as the submarine Isaac Peral (A-0), subsequently anchored there as well. With Isaac Peral as its flagship, the submarine squadron called at Barcelona from 11 November until the morning of 20 November 1928 for a crew rest period.

In May 1929, all six B-class submarines as well as C-1, C-2, and their sister ship C-3 attended the 1929 Barcelona International Exposition, arriving in Barcelona a few days before the exposition officially opened on 19 May. They remained at Barcelona until the last week of May. B-6 took part in the annual squadron maneuvers in the Mediterranean Sea between mid-September and mid-October 1929, arriving in Barcelona in mid-October 1929 for a crew rest period.

=== Second Spanish Republic, 1931–1936 ===
On 14 April 1931, the Second Spanish Republic was proclaimed, replacing the Kingdom of Spain. The Spanish Navy came under the republic's control as the Spanish Republican Navy. In January 1932, President of the Republic Niceto Alcalá Zamora visited Alicante aboard the destroyer Alcalá Galiano, and B-5 and B-6 accompanied him on the visit.

From June 1933 until 6 July 1933, B-6 participated in maneuvers along with B-5, C-2, C-3, the submarines C-4, C-5, and C-6, four light cruisers, nine destroyers, and several smaller and auxiliary vessels. B-6 also took part in the spring maneuvers of 1934 in the Mediterranean Sea, then participated in a naval review off Alcudia presided over by Zamora. An order of the Ministry of the Navy of 15 August 1934 mandated that the crew size of all six B-class submarines increase from 28 to 34 men.

In the first half of May 1936, B-6 was among several submarines that took part in maneuvers in the Canary Islands. After they concluded, B-6 returned to Cartagena.

=== Spanish Civil War ===
On 17 July 1936, the Spanish Civil War began, with Nationalist forces under Francisco Franco opposing Republican forces which remained loyal to the Second Spanish Republic. At the time, B-6 was part of the submarine flotilla at Cartagena. Early on 18 July, the flotilla received orders from the Republican government to patrol the Mediterranean between Cabo de Gata and the Strait of Gibraltar to intercept ships carrying Nationalist troops and equipment from North Africa to Spain. B-6 got underway immediately, rendezvoused at sea with Isaac Peral (the former C-1), C-3, C-4, and C-6, and took up a patrol line along the Andalusian coast. The other submarines of the Cartagena division joined them over the following days.

It quickly became apparent that most of the division's officers supported the Nationalists while the crews supported the Republicans, so the crews mutinied and placed most of the officers under arrest. B-6′s crew arrested her commanding officer on 18 July and placed her engineer in command. Only two days into the operation, on 20 July, the submarine flotilla entered the harbor at Málaga, where the division's commander, Capitán de fragata (Frigate Captain) Francisco Guimerá Bosch, and most of the other senior officers in the division were relieved of command and transferred to the prison ship Monte Toro. The flotilla's operations officer assumed command of the division.

B-6 and C-3 departed Malaga on the morning of 21 July 1936 with orders to find and escort the oil tanker Ophir to Tangier on the North African coast. B-6 got underway again on 20 August 1936 and called at Málaga on 22 August due to damage. While she was there, a shortage of experienced officers in the Republican naval forces after the purge of Nationalist sympathizers led to the appointment of Alférez de navío (Ship-of-the-Line Ensign) Oscar Scharfhausen Kebbon as her commanding officer despite his support of the Nationalist cause. With B-6′s second-in-command watching Scharfhausen closely, B-6 returned to Cartagena on 23 August 1936 to prepare for a voyage to Spain's northern coast.

B-6 departed Cartagena on either 14 or 15 September 1936, according to different sources, bound for Bilbao under Scharfhausen's command with a cargo of 700 boxes of ammunition for Republican forces fighting in northern Spain, with each box weighing 33 kilograms (73 lb). The presence of the boxes created much discomfort for B-6′s crew in the limited space aboard the submarine.

=== Loss ===
B-6 was on the surface in the Cantabrian Sea off the northern coast of Spain on 19 September 1936 at 08:30 when the Nationalist destroyer Velasco sighted her while Velasco was 25 nautical miles (46 km; 29 mi) off Cabo Blanco. Velasco — which was on a mission to lay 40 mines at Santander and Bilbao and was steaming north-northeast — increased speed to 25 knots (46 km/h; 29 mph) and turned toward B-6. B-6 submerged after a few minutes and Velasco returned to her original course at 09:15. At 11:15, Velasco rendezvoused with two other Nationalist warships, Ciriza No. 4 and Galicia — described by sources both as armed tugs and as armed trawlers — which had orders to escort her on her minelaying mission. Velasco reported her sighting of B-6 to Ciriza No. 4 and Galicia and continued on course toward Santander.

At 12:30, Velasco set course due west to proceed to Bilbao. At the same time Galicia — which was 15 nautical miles (28 km; 17 mi) north of Cape Peñas heading east-northeast, with Ciriza No.4 three nautical miles (5.6 km; 3.5 mi) ahead and three nautical miles (5.6 km; 3.5 mi) to port of her — sighted B-6, which was traveling at high speed on the surface astern of her, apparently attempting to pass Galicia on her port side. When B-6 was about 5,000 metres (5,500 yards) from Galicia, Galicia sounded her siren to alert Ciriza No. 4 to B-6′s presence. Galicia closed the range with B-6 and opened fire on B-6 with her 57 mm (2.2-inch) gun. After a few minutes of gunfire, Galicia′s crew discerned that she had damaged B-6, but B-6 quickly submerged. Lacking sonar and therefore unable to track a submerged submarine, Galicia maintained course and, when she estimated that she was directly above B-6, dropped a depth charge, but noted no results.

Meanwhile, aboard B-6, Scharfhausen — whose brother the Republicans had murdered recently — committed an act of sabotage by leaving the valve for the voice tube to the bridge open in B-6′s conning tower after the submarine submerged. This allowed water to enter the conning tower, simulating a leak. As Scharfhausen had hoped, this alarmed B-6′s inexperienced crew, who gladly followed his order to unnecessarily surface immediately, thinking B-6 was in danger of sinking.

B-6 surfaced about 1,500 metres (1,600 yards) from Galicia and opened fire with her 76.2 mm (3-inch) deck gun at a range of 800 metres (870 yards). In the ensuing gun battle B-6 hit Galicia eight times. Three rounds hit Galicia′s superstructure, one of them striking her bridge, another her wheel, and another her whistle pipe. These three hits killed one of Galicia′s bow gun crewmen, cutting his body in two, and inflicted minor wounds on Galicia′s commanding officer, second-in-command, and two others. B-6's five other hits wounded three more Galicia crewmen, and one of these hits started a leak in Galicia′s port coal bunker, while another damaged her boiler, dropping her speed to 4 knots (7.4 km/h; 4.6 mph). After Galicia′s commanding officer took personal charge of her gun crew, she returned fire with some accuracy. Using her superior speed, B-6 opened the range and then submerged, bringing the gun battle to an end after about three hours.

Meanwhile, Velasco′s commanding officer learned of the sighting of B-6 at 14:30. He ordered Velasco to turn due west and increase speed to 27 knots (50 km/h; 31 mph). At 15:15, Velasco sighted a small column of smoke, and a few minutes later she sighted Galicia and Ciriza No. 4 and, to their north, a faint cloud of smoke from B-6′s diesel engine exhaust. By 15:30 Velasco had B-6 in sight, heading north on the surface about 4 nmi (7.4 km; 4.6 mi) from Galicia. At 15:40, Velasco′s rangefinder determined that B-6 was at a range of 6,440 metres (7,040 yd), and she opened fire on the submarine with her forward 101.6 mm (4-inch) gun, scoring multiple hits. B-6 raised a surrender flag, and Velasco ceased fire at 15:47.

At 16:00, Velasco and B-6 came within hailing distance of one another, and Scharfhausen ordered B-6′s crew to cease all communications with Republican forces. Scharfhausen informed Velasco′s commanding officer that B-6 had a significant leak, but Velasco′s commander insisted on making an attempt to keep B-6 from sinking and ordered Velasco′s second-in-command to lead a team of specialists in boarding B-6 to save her. Velasco lowered a boat with her second-in-command and his team aboard, but at 16:15, just as the boat separated from Velasco, B-6 began to sink by the stern and B-6′s crew began to abandon ship; one source claims that B-6′s crew scuttled her. Scharfhausen was the last to leave B-6, making sure to bring with him B-6′s secret codebook rather than destroy it to prevent its capture by the Nationalists.

Ciriza No. 4 arrived on the scene and began to recover survivors while Velasco′s screw threw almost all the destroyer's life preservers into the water. Velasco′s boat rescued 14 survivors, Ciriza No. 4 rescued seven, and Velasco herself pulled 36 men from the water. One source claims that two members of B-6′s crew died in her sinking. Another states that one man sank while attempting to don a life preserver and drowned, leading to speculation that he was B-6′s political commissar and therefore preferred drowning to being captured and facing a Nationalist court-martial and execution by firing squad. By 16:20, B-6 had sunk about 15 nautical miles (28 km; 17 mi) north of Cape Peñas.

Galicia arrived soon thereafter and came alongside Velasco to take aboard B-6′s survivors. The two ships' hulls collided during this maneuver, causing a leak aboard Velasco and knocking out her depth-charge launching train. The damage prompted Velasco to cancel her plans to mine Bilbao and instead proceed to Ferrol while Ciriza No. 4 and Galicia returned to their base at Ribadeo.
