= Spanish submarine C-6 =

Spanish Navy submarine of 1930–1937

- Line drawing of a C-class submarine

History

Spain
- Name: C-6
- Builder: SECN, Cartagena, Spain
- Laid down: 12 February 1925
- Launched: 26 December 1929
- Commissioned: 27 September 1930
- Fate: Scuttled 20 October 1937 Refloated November 1947 Sank under tow

General characteristics (per Conway's 1922–1946)
- Class & type: C-class submarine
- Displacement: 916 long tons (931 t) surfaced; 1,290 long tons (1,311 t) submerged
- Length: 75.30 m (247 ft)
- Beam: 6.34 m (20 ft10 in)
- Draft: 4.10 m (13 ft 6 in)
- Installed power: 2,000 bhp (1,491 kW) diesel; 750 hp (559 kW) electric
- Propulsion: 2 × Vickers diesel engines; 2 × electric motors; 2 × screws
- Speed: 16 knots (30 km/h; 18 mph) surfaced; 8.5 knots (15.7 km/h; 9.8 mph) submerged
- Range: 4,000 nmi (4,600 mi; 7,400 km) surfaced; 125 nmi (144 mi; 232 km) at 4.5 knots (8.3 km/h; 5.2 mph) submerged
- Test depth: 79 m (260 ft)
- Complement: 46
- Armament: 6 × 533 mm (21 in) torpedo tubes (4 bow, 2 stern); 1 × 75 mm (3.0 in) anti-aircraft gun

General characteristics (per Todoavante)
- Class & type: C-class submarine
- Displacement: 915 long tons (930 t) surfaced; 1,150 long tons (1,168 t) submerged
- Length: 75.3 m (247 ft 1 in)
- Beam: 5.6 m (18 ft 4 in)
- Draft: 5.80 m (19 ft 0 in)
- Depth: 5.64 m (18 ft 6 in)
- Installed power: 2,000 bhp (1,491 kW) diesel; 750 hp (559 kW) electric
- Propulsion: 2 × 1,000 hp (746 kW) diesel engines; 2 × 375 hp (280 kW) electric motors; 2 × screws
- Speed: 16.5 knots (30.6 km/h; 19.0 mph) surfaced; 8.5 knots (15.7 km/h; 9.8 mph) submerged
- Range: 6,800 nmi (7,800 mi; 12,600 km) at 10 knots (19 km/h; 12 mph) surfaced; 3,200 nmi (3,700 mi; 5,900 km) at 16 knots (30 km/h; 18 mph) surfaced; 150 nmi (170 mi; 280 km) at 4.5 knots (8.3 km/h; 5.2 mph) submerged
- Test depth: 80 m (262 ft)
- Complement: 40
- Armament: 6 × 533 mm (21 in) torpedo tubes (4 bow, 2 stern); 10 × Whitehead torpedoes; 1 × 76 mm (3 in) deck gun; 1 × "detachable antiaircraft gun"

C-6 was a C-class submarine of the Spanish Navy in commissioned in 1930. She served initially under the Kingdom of Spain, then as a unit of the Spanish Republican Navy under the Second Spanish Republic. She took part in the Spanish Civil War on the side of Republican faction loyal to the government of the Second Spanish Republic. She was scuttled in 1937 during the civil war.

== Construction and commissioning ==
In 1915, the Spanish Cortes Generales passed the Miranda Law, a naval construction program which called for a Spanish Navy force that included 28 submarines. Shortages during World War I (1914–1918) and budgetary limitations led to delays in the program, but a new naval law passed on 11 January 1922 authorized the construction of the six C-class submarines. The Sociedad Española de Construcción Naval (SECN) built all six of the submarines at Cartagena, Spain.

C-6 was the sixth and final vessel of the class. SECN laid her keel on 12 February 1925 and launched her on 26 December 1929. She was commissioned on 27 September 1930.

== Service history ==
=== Kingdom of Spain, 1930–1931 ===
Upon commissioning, C-6 was assigned to the submarine squadron at Cartagena. She participated in maneuvers in the Cantabrian Sea off the northern coast of Spain during September and October 1930.

=== Second Spanish Republic, 1931–1936 ===
On 14 April 1931, the Second Spanish Republic was proclaimed, replacing the Kingdom of Spain. The Spanish Navy came under the republic's control as the Spanish Republican Navy. In January 1932, President of the Republic Niceto Alcalá Zamora came aboard C-6 while presiding over the dedication of a pier at Alicante.

All six C-class submarines took part in fleet maneuvers during May and June 1934. C-6 and her sister ship C-3 subsequently conducted a cruise in the Mediterranean Sea, during which they visited Bizerte in Tunisia; Alexandria in Egypt; Haifa in Mandatory Palestine; Rhodes in the Italian Dodecanese; Thessaloniki and Piraeus in Greece, La Maddalena on Sardinia; and Toulon in France. They concluded the cruise with their arrival at Cartagena.

The six C-class submarines departed Cartagena on 29 July 1935 to begin a lengthy training cruise. They called at Melilla on the coast of North Africa from 31 July to 3 August and at Cádiz from 5 to 7 August. They then set course for the United Kingdom, reaching Plymouth, England, in mid-August. They subsequently visited Brest in France, Ferrol, and the Canary Islands before proceeding to West Africa, where they called at Dakar in Senegal and Villa Cisneros in Río de Oro. They then returned to the Canary Islands for a stop at Las Palmas on Gran Canaria and called at Larache in Spanish Morocco before concluding the cruise with their arrival at Cartagena in September 1935.

C-6 was one of several submarines that took part in maneuvers in the Canary Islands during the first half of May 1936. She returned to Cartagena upon their completion.

=== Spanish Civil War ===
On 17 July 1936, the Spanish Civil War began, with Nationalist forces under Francisco Franco opposing Republican forces which remained loyal to the Second Spanish Republic. At the time, C-6 was at Cartagena as a unit of the Cartagena division. Early on 18 July, the division received orders from the Republican government to patrol the Mediterranean along the Andalusian coast between Cabo de Gata and the Strait of Gibraltar to intercept ships carrying Nationalist troops and equipment from North Africa to Spain. C-6, C-3, and their sister ships Isaac Peral and C-4 got underway immediately, rendezvoused at sea with the submarine B-6, and began the patrol. They took up a patrol line along the Andalusian coast, and the other submarines of the Cartagena division joined them over the following days.

It quickly became apparent that most of the division's officers supported the Nationalists while the crews supported the Republicans, so the crews mutinied, established "ship's committees" of sailors with the power to choose their officers and direct the operations of their vessels, and placed most of the officers under arrest. Only two days into the operation, on 20 July, the submarine division entered the harbor at Málaga, where the division's commander, Capitán de fragata (Frigate Captain) Francisco Guimerá Bosch, and most of the other senior officers in the division were relieved of command and transferred to the prison ship Monte Toro. C-6′s commanding officer, Capitán de corbeta (Corvette Captain) Romero Carnero, was among those removed, and an alférez de navío (ship-of-the-line ensign) took command of the submarine. On 27 July 1936, all destroyers and submarines at Málaga deployed around Cádiz to intercept a Nationalist convoy that proved to be a decoy. Then C-6 and her sister ships C-2, and C-3 received instructions to form a patrol arc along the coast of North Africa off the harbor at Ceuta to prevent the entrance of the Nationalist light cruiser Almirante Cervera, which had left Ferrol bound for the Strait of Gibraltar and was thought to be headed for Ceuta.

The need for experienced officers to command Republican submarines led to Romero Carnero's reinstatement as C-6′s commanding officer on 15 August 1936. That day, C-6 and C-3 got underway bound for the Cantabrian Sea along Spain's northern coast. C-3 suffered a mechanical breakdown that forced her to return to Cartagena, but C-6 continued alone and arrived at Gijón on 17 August 1936. While at Gijón, Romero received word that Almirante Cervera was anchored off the coast of Asturias and was bombarding Republican forces there. Rather than using this information to attack Almirante Cervera, Romero had C-6 get underway for San Sebastián, where the Nationalist battleship España reportedly was anchored off the coast. After Romero also failed to attack España, claiming that technical difficulties prevented it, C-6′s crew accused him of Nationalist sympathies, mutinied, and once again replaced him with the alférez de navío (ship-of-the-line ensign). The Republican government ordered C-6 to return to the Mediterreanean Sea.

On 1 September 1936, the president of C-6′s ship's committee, a torpedo boat commander, took command of C-6. C-6 departed that day for another deployment to Spain's northern coast, arriving at Gijón on 7 September 1936. On 2 October 1936, C-6, C-3 and C-4 again set out for the Mediterranean, with C-3 and C-4 reaching Málaga on 8 October and C-6 continuing on to Cartagena.

By the beginning of 1937, C-6 was based at Málaga. She was in port there when a Nationalist air raid killed her commanding officer on 2 January 1937. On 11 January she returned to Cartagena, avoiding an attack on Málaga by Nationalist warships.

The Soviet Union actively supported the Republican faction, and on 1 February 1937 a Soviet Navy officer took command of C-6. Under his command, C-6 carried out several training exercises in the following days. He then decided to attack Nationalist ships anchored at Ceuta, but bad weather forced him to cancel these plans. Days later, C-6 got underway to attack Nationalist ships at Palma de Mallorca on Mallorca in the Balearic Islands, but a Nationalist aircraft damaged her in a bombing attack on 21 February 1937, forcing her to turn back for Cartagena. She reached Cartagena on 22 February and began repairs.

C-6′ repairs were completed on 28 April 1937. At the end of April she departed Cartagena to make her third deployment of the war to the Cantabrian Sea along Spain's northern coast. She rendezvoused with C-2 and C-4 at the Port of El Musel at Gijón, then moved on to Santander, where she arrived on 6 May, and Bilbao, which she reached on 12 May. Aircraft of the German Condor Legion attacked her at Bilbao, extensively damaging her and killing six and wounding three members of her crew. She underwent repairs at Sestao until 31 May 1937.

C-6 departed Bilbao in company with C-4 on 7 June 1937 and reached Santander on 9 June without encountering any Nationalist ships. A new Soviet Navy officer reported aboard to relieve her commander, but both Soviet officers remained aboard when she got underway from Santander on 18 June 1937 to attack Almirante Cervera off Cantabria. On the night of 20 June 1937 C-6 approached Almirante Cervera on the surface and fired two torpedoes, both of which malfunctioned: The first veered off course and began circling C-6, while the second torpedo went into a steep dive and exploded upon hitting the seabed.

C-6′s new Soviet commanding officer took her out on numerous patrols, during which C-6 sighted Almirante Cervera but could not close for an attack. On the night of 27–28 July 1937 C-6 sighted the Nationalist heavy cruiser Baleares and fired two torpedoes at her, both of which missed.

With the fall of Santander to Nationalist forces imminent, C-6, C-2, and C-4 left Santander in August 1937, evacuating Republican military personnel and politicians. C-6 also embarked Soviet staff and treasure worth 15 million pesetas at the time.

After Nationalist warships bombarded the Port of EL Musel at Gijón at the end of August 1937, C-2 and C-4 fled to ports in France. Damage forced C-6 to remain behind. When she finally left port she encountered the Nationalist minelayer Jupiter on 14 October 1937 and fired two torpedoes at her. One torpedo was deflected and missed, and the other one sank.

C-6 returned to Gijón. Just before Gijón fell to Nationalist forces, Nationalist warships again bombarded the port, and C-6 sustained damage that prevented her from submerging. To prevent her capture by the Nationalists, her crew took her out of the harbor and scuttled her on 20 October 1937 in waters 100 metres (330 feet) deep. Torpedo Boat No. 3 rescued her crew, and her Soviet officers withdrew from Gijón by air. The Spanish Civil War continued until 1 April 1939, when it ended in a Nationalist victory and the establishment of Francoist Spain.

== Final disposition ==
The wreck of C-6 was refloated in November 1947 and taken under tow to the Port of El Musel at Gijón. The tow failed en route, and C-6 sank again.

== Notes ==
=== Bibliography ===
- ABC (newspaper, in Spanish)
- Aguilera, Alfredo; Elías, Vicente (1980). Buques de guerra españoles, 1885-1971 [Spanish Warships, 1885–1971] (in Spanish). Madrid: Editorial San Martín.
- Cayuelas Robles, Ramón (1999). Relatos inéditos de los submarinos republicanos en la guerra civil española: C-5 y C-2 [Unpublished Accounts of the Republican Submarines in the Spanish Civil War: C-5 and C-2] (in Spanish). Editorial Club Universitario.
- Cervera Pery, José (1988). La guerra naval española (1936-39) [The Spanish Naval War (1936–39)] (in Spanish). Madrid: Editorial San Martín.
- Chesneau, Roger, ed. (1980). Conway's All the World's Fighting Ships 1922–1946. Greenwich, UK: Conway Maritime Press. ISBN 0-85177-146-7.
- La Vanguardia newspaper (in Spanish)
- González, Marcelino (2012). Otros 50 Barcos españoles [Another 50 Spanish Ships] (in Spanish). Gijón, Spain: Fundación Alvargonzález.
