= Spanish submarine C-2 =

Spanish Navy submarine of 1928–1951

- Line drawing of a C-class submarine

History

Spain
- Name: C-2
- Builder: SECN, Cartagena, Spain
- Laid down: 15 September 1923
- Launched: 4 March or 4 May 1928
- Commissioned: 19 July 1928
- Decommissioned: June 1951
- Identification: Pennant number C-2
- Fate: Sank under tow to breakers

General characteristics (per Conway's 1922–1946)
- Class & type: C-class submarine
- Displacement: 916 long tons (931 t) surfaced; 1,290 long tons (1,311 t) submerged
- Length: 75.30 m (247 ft)
- Beam: 6.34 m (20 ft10 in)
- Draft: 4.10 m (13 ft 6 in)
- Installed power: 2,000 bhp (1,491 kW) diesel; 750 hp (559 kW) electric
- Propulsion: 2 × Vickers diesel engines; 2 × electric motors; 2 × screws
- Speed: 16 knots (30 km/h; 18 mph) surfaced; 8.5 knots (15.7 km/h; 9.8 mph) submerged
- Range: 4,000 nmi (4,600 mi; 7,400 km) surfaced; 125 nmi (144 mi; 232 km) at 4.5 knots (8.3 km/h; 5.2 mph) submerged
- Test depth: 79 m (260 ft)
- Complement: 46
- Armament: 6 × 533 mm (21 in) torpedo tubes (4 bow, 2 stern); 1 × 75 mm (3.0 in) anti-aircraft gun

General characteristics (per Todoavante))
- Class & type: C-class submarine
- Displacement: 915 long tons (930 t) surfaced; 1,150 long tons (1,168 t) submerged
- Length: 75.3 m (247 ft 1 in)
- Beam: 5.6 m (18 ft 4 in)
- Draft: 5.80 m (19 ft 0 in)
- Depth: 5.64 m (18 ft 6 in)
- Installed power: 2,000 bhp (1,491 kW) diesel; 750 hp (559 kW) electric
- Propulsion: 2 × 1,000 hp (746 kW) diesel engines; 2 × 375 hp (280 kW) electric motors; 2 × screws
- Speed: 16.5 knots (30.6 km/h; 19.0 mph) surfaced; 8.5 knots (15.7 km/h; 9.8 mph) submerged
- Range: 6,800 nmi (7,800 mi; 12,600 km) at 10 knots (19 km/h; 12 mph) surfaced; 3,200 nmi (3,700 mi; 5,900 km) at 16 knots (30 km/h; 18 mph) surfaced; 150 nmi (170 mi; 280 km) at 4.5 knots (8.3 km/h; 5.2 mph) submerged
- Test depth: 80 m (262 ft)
- Complement: 40
- Armament: 6 × 533 mm (21 in) torpedo tubes (4 bow, 2 stern); 10 × Whitehead torpedoes; 1 × 76 mm (3 in) deck gun; 1 × "detachable antiaircraft gun"

C-2 was a C-class submarine of the Spanish Navy in commission from 1928 to 1951. She served initially under the Kingdom of Spain, then as a unit of the Spanish Republican Navy under the Second Spanish Republic. She took part in the Spanish Civil War on the side of the Republican faction loyal to the government of the Second Spanish Republic. After the war, she became part of the naval forces of Francoist Spain.

== Construction and commissioning ==
In 1915, the Spanish Cortes Generales passed the Miranda Law, a naval construction program which called for a Spanish Navy force that included 28 submarines. Shortages during World War I (1914–1918) and budgetary limitations led to delays in the program, but a new naval law passed on 11 January 1922 authorized the construction of the six C-class submarines. The Sociedad Española de Construcción Naval (SECN) built all six of the submarines at Cartagena, Spain.

C-2 was the second of the class. SECN laid her keel on 15 September 1923 and launched her on either 4 March or 4 May 1928, according to different sources. She was commissioned on 19 July 1928.

== Service history ==
=== Kingdom of Spain, 1928–1931 ===
Upon commissioning, C-2 was assigned to the submarine squadron at Cartagena. She got underway from Cartagena in late July 1928 as part of a flotilla that also included her sister ship C-1 and all six B-class submarines. The flotilla proceeded to the Cantabrian Sea to conduct maneuvers off Spain's northern coast. After completing the maneuvers, the submarine flotilla made stops at Ferrol, Marín, and Vigo on the Spanish mainland and Ceuta on the coast of North Africa before returning to Cartagena on 26 September 1928.

The submarines conducted maneuvers with the Spanish fleet in the Mediterranean Sea during October and November 1928 and made a port call at Palma de Mallorca on Mallorca in the Balearic Islands in early November. Upon the conclusion of the maneuvers, they proceeded to Barcelona, arriving there during the second week of November 1928.

In May 1929, C-1, C-2, and their sister ship C-3 attended two World's Fair exhibitions which Spain hosted collectively as the General Spanish Exhibition, visiting the Ibero-American Exposition of 1929 in Seville and the 1929 Barcelona International Exposition in Barcelona. The three submarines and their sister ship C-4 took part in fleet maneuvers in the Mediterranean Sea during September and October 1929.

In mid-August 1930, all six C-class submarines — the last two vessels of the class, C-5 and C-6, having joined the fleet during 1930 — arrived in Ferrol from Cartagena and then participated in maneuvers in the Cantabrian Sea during September and October 1930. After returning to Cartagena, the submarines took part in more exercises. Escorted by the gunboat Laya and torpedo boat No. 20, C-2 and the submarine Isaac Peral (the former C-1) got underway from Cartagena in early November 1930 bound for Mahón on Menorca in the Balearic Islands and subsequently carried out a variety of exercises in the waters of the Balearics. Both submarines entered dry dock at Mahón in February 1931 to have their hulls cleaned.

=== Second Spanish Republic, 1931–1936 ===
On 14 April 1931, the Second Spanish Republic was proclaimed, replacing the Kingdom of Spain. The Spanish Navy came under the republic's control as the Spanish Republican Navy. On 1 April 1932, the President of the Republic Niceto Alcalá-Zamora boarded C-2, and she put to sea for a brief cruise off Palma de Mallorca so that her crew could demonstrate for him the use of a buoy to rescue people from the water.

In June 1933, maneuvers began in which C-2, C-3, C-4, C-5, C-6, the submarines B-5 and B-6, four cruisers, nine destroyers, the seaplane carrier Dédalo, and several smaller vessels participated. They concluded on 6 July 1933. All six C-class submarines took part in fleet maneuvers during May and June 1934.

On 29 July 1935, the six C-class submarines departed Cartagena to begin a lengthy training cruise. They called at Melilla on the coast of North Africa from 31 July to 3 August and at Cádiz from 5 to 7 August. They then set course for the United Kingdom, reaching Plymouth, England, in mid-August. They subsequently visited Brest in France, Ferrol, and the Canary Islands before proceeding to West Africa, where they called at Dakar in Senegal and Villa Cisneros in Río de Oro. They then returned to the Canary Islands for a stop at Las Palmas on Gran Canaria and called at Larache in Spanish Morocco before concluding the cruise with their arrival at Cartagena in September 1935.

C-2 was one of several submarines that took part in maneuvers in the Canary Islands during the first half of May 1936. She returned to Cartagena upon their completion.

=== Spanish Civil War, 1936–1939 ===
On 17 July 1936, the Spanish Civil War began, with Nationalist forces under Francisco Franco opposing Republican forces which remained loyal to the Second Spanish Republic. At the time, C-2 was at Cartagena as part of the Cartagena division. Early on 18 July, the division received orders from the Republican government to patrol the Mediterranean between Cabo de Gata and the Strait of Gibraltar to intercept ships carrying Nationalist troops and equipment from North Africa to Spain. Isaac Peral, C-3, C-4, and C-6 got underway immediately, rendezvoused at sea with the submarine B-6, and began the patrol. Other submarines of the Cartagena division joined them in the following days, including C-2, which got underway from Cartagena on 23 July. During these operations, C-2 prevented the German merchant ship Sebu from unloading at Larache on 28 July and stopped the merchant ship Lahneck from entering port at Seville in August. She had to abandon an attempt to intercept the Italian merchant ship Nereide when she found Nereide defended by the Italian Regia Marina (Royal Navy) destroyer Antonio da Noli, as well as an attempt near Melilla to intercept the British merchant ship Marklyn, finding that two British Royal Navy destroyers were escorting Marklyn. C-2 and Isaac Peral made port in North Africa at Tangier, where C-5 later joined them.

During these early operations, it became apparent that most of the division's officers supported the Nationalists while the crews supported the Republicans, so the crews mutinied and placed most of the officers under arrest. The division's operations officer assumed command of the division. C-2's crew assassinated her commanding officer and executive officer on 15 August 1936. During the second half of August 1936, C-2 and Isaac Peral operated in the vicinity of Málaga, joining B-5 and several destroyers in conducting several patrols in the Strait of Gibraltar and the Mediterranean Sea.

C-2 departed Cartagena on 11 September 1936 bound for the northern coast of Spain with a cargo of weapons and ammunition for Republican forces fighting there. Her batteries were in poor condition, so she called at Bilbao in October 1936 to await the arrival of spare parts. During her lengthy stay at Bilbao, Nationalist aircraft attacked the port, and C-2 shot down a trimotor bomber. The parts C-2 needed finally arrived at Bilbao in April 1937 aboard a British merchant ship, and repairs began. By the end of May 1937, C-2's repairs were complete. She moved to Santander in mid-June 1937, from which she carried out several patrols in the Cantabrian Sea.

In late August 1937, C-2, C-4, and C-6 moved to Gijón. A Nationalist air attack on the Port of El Musel at Gijón on 26 August damaged all three submarines. C-2 entered port at Brest, France, on 1 September 1937 on the pretext of seeking repairs. During her stay at Brest, her commanding officer conspired with several Nationalists in an attempt to seize control of C-2 for the Nationalist faction on the night of 18 August 1937. They failed, and a different officer took command of C-2 the following day. C-2 proceeded to Saint-Nazaire, France, in November 1937 to complete her repairs.

C-2 suffered numerous mechanical breakdowns while in France, mostly due to sabotage by Nationalist sympathizers. The Soviet Union supported the Republican faction, and a Soviet Navy officer took command of C-2 on 1 January 1938 under a Spanish pseudonym. With her repairs complete, C-2 finally got underway from Saint-Nazaire on 17 June 1938 bound for Cartagena, which she reached on 26 June 1938. A different Soviet Navy officer took command of her there, also under a Spanish pseudonym. C-2 underwent additional repairs at Cartagena, and with them complete, she began patrols in the Strait of Gibraltar and the Mediterranean Sea in mid-August 1938, during which she called at several ports, including Barcelona, Mahón, and Cartagena.

By the beginning of March 1939, the Spanish Civil War was nearing its conclusion, with Nationalist forces closing in on their final victory. A Nationalist uprising against Republican control broke out in Cartagena on 4 March, and the Republican ships at Cartagena departed on 5 March to seek refuge at Bizerte in Tunisia. C-2 was in the shipyard at Cartagena, however, and did not put to sea when the Republican squadron left. On 6 March, with Republican forces regaining control of Cartagena and about to take back control of the shipyard itself, C-2's commanding officer, in collaboration with Nationalist sympathizers, put to sea on 6 March and made for Palma de Mallorca, where C-2 arrived on 7 March. They surrendered C-2 to the Nationalists at Palma de Mallorca that day. The war ended in a Nationalist victory on 1 April 1939.

=== Francoist Spain, 1939–1951 ===
After the Spanish Civil War, C-2 became part of the naval forces of Francoist Spain. She conducted maneuvers other Spanish Navy vessels in the ensuing years.

At the end of February 1948, the Spanish Navy reclassified C-2 as a surface ship. On 8 September 1948 she replaced the submarine B-2 as the training ship at the Mechanics School at Ferrol.

C-2 was decommissioned in June 1951. She was sold for scrapping, but sank off Punta de Estaca de Bares while under tow to a shipbreaker in Avilés.
