= Spanish submarine C-3 =

Spanish Navy submarine of 1929–1936

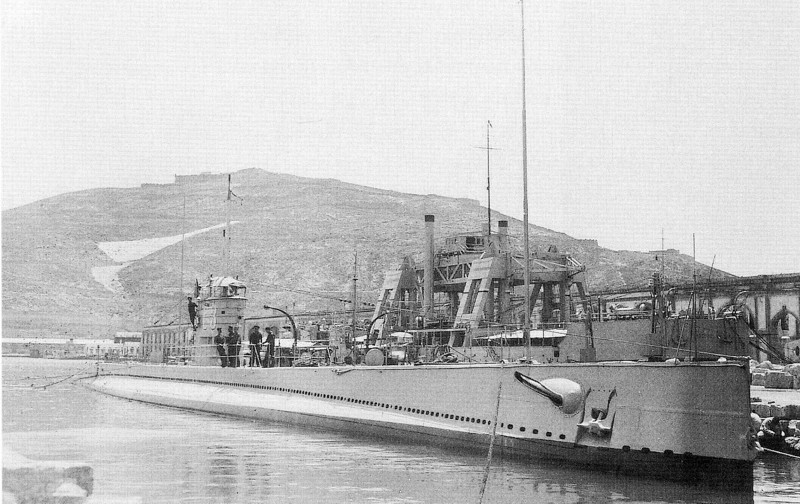
- C-3 alongside the submarine rescue vessel Kanguro

History

Spain
- Name: C-3
- Ordered: 17 February 1915
- Builder: SECN, Cartagena, Spain
- Laid down: 5 May 1924
- Launched: 20 February 1929
- Commissioned: 4 May 1929
- Decommissioned: 31 July 1941
- Fate: Sunk 12 December 1936
- Stricken: 31 July 1941

General characteristics
- Class & type: C-class diesel-electric submarine
- Displacement: 925 t (910 long tons) surfaced; 1,144 t (1,126 long tons) submerged
- Length: 73 m (239 ft 6 in)
- Beam: 6.3 m (20 ft 8 in)
- Draft: 5.3 m (17 ft 5 in)
- Propulsion: 2 Vickers main diesels, 1,000 CV (740 kW) each; 2 electric motors, 375 CV each; 2 shafts
- Speed: 16.5 knots (30.6 km/h; 19.0 mph) surfaced; 8.5 knots (15.7 km/h; 9.8 mph) submerged
- Range: 6,800 nmi (12,600 km; 7,800 mi) at 10 knots (19 km/h; 12 mph) surfaced; 150 nmi (280 km; 170 mi) at 4.5 knots (8.3 km/h; 5.2 mph) submerged
- Complement: 40
- Armament: 6 × 533 mm (21.0 in) torpedo tubes (four bow, two stern, 10 torpedoes); 1 × 75 mm (3.0 in) Bonifaz deck gun

C-3 was a C-class submarine of the Spanish Navy in commissioned in 1929. She served initially under the Kingdom of Spain, then as a unit of the Spanish Republican Navy under the Second Spanish Republic. She took part in the Spanish Civil War on the side of Republican faction loyal to the government of the Second Spanish Republic. During the civil war, the German submarine U-34 sank her on 12 December 1936.

== Construction and commissioning ==
A line drawing of a C-class submarine.

In 1915, the Spanish Cortes Generales passed the Miranda Law, a naval construction program which called for a Spanish Navy force that included 28 submarines. Shortages during World War I (1914–1918) and budgetary limitations led to delays in the program, but a new naval law passed on 11 January 1922 authorized the construction of the six C-class submarines. The Sociedad Española de Construcción Naval (SECN) built all six of the submarines at Cartagena, Spain.

C-3 was the third of the class. SECN laid her keel on 5 May 1924 and launched her on 20 February 1929. She was commissioned on 4 May 1929 with Capitán de corbeta (Corvette Captain) Felipe José Abárzuza y Oliva — a future almirante (admiral) and minister of the navy — in command.

== Service history ==
=== Kingdom of Spain, 1928–1931 ===
Upon commissioning, C-3 was assigned to the submarine squadron at Cartagena. In May 1929, C-3 and her sister ships C-1 and C-2 attended two World's Fair exhibitions which Spain hosted collectively as the General Spanish Exhibition, visiting the Ibero-American Exposition of 1929 in Seville and the 1929 Barcelona International Exposition in Barcelona. The three submarines and their sister ship C-4 took part in fleet maneuvers in the Mediterranean Sea during September and October 1929.

In July 1930, C-3's crew carried out several initial tests of a submarine rescue chamber (similar to the McCann Submarine Rescue Chamber) developed by Capitán de corbeta (Corvette Captain) Arturo Génova Torrecuellar, which was designed to bring crewmen of sunken submarines to the surface from depths of up to 140 metres (459 ft). C-3 conducted these early tests in the docks at Cartagena at depths of only about 15 metres (49 ft).

In mid-August 1930, all six C-class submarines — the last two vessels of the class, C-5 and C-6, having joined the fleet during 1930 — arrived in Ferrol from Cartagena. They then participated in maneuvers in the Cantabrian Sea off the northern coast of Spain during September and October 1930.

=== Second Spanish Republic, 1931–1936 ===
On 14 April 1931, the Second Spanish Republic was proclaimed, replacing the Kingdom of Spain. The Spanish Navy came under the republic's control as the Spanish Republican Navy.

On 14 September 1931, C-3 successfully tested Génova's submarine rescue chamber off Escombreras outside the harbor at Cartagena. Thanks to this successful test, the rescue chamber subsequently was installed on all C-class submarines as a portable unit, as well as on the subsequent D-class submarines, which used a fixed unit.

In 1933, C-3, Isaac Peral (the former C-1), C-4, C-5, and the submarines Narciso Monturiol (A-1) and B-5 conducted maneuvers off Tarragona. They arrived at Castellón on 29 September 1933 at the end of a voyage from Vinaròs, then got back underway to continue their training cruise, which lasted until the end of October 1933.

All six C-class submarines took part in fleet maneuvers during May and June 1934. C-3 and C-6 subsequently conducted a cruise in the Mediterranean Sea, during which they visited Bizerte in Tunisia; Alexandria in Egypt; Haifa in Mandatory Palestine; Rhodes in the Italian Dodecanese; Thessaloniki and Piraeus in Greece, La Maddalena on Sardinia; and Toulon in France. They concluded the cruise with their arrival at Cartagena.

The six C-class submarines departed Cartagena on 29 July 1935 to begin a lengthy training cruise. They called at Melilla on the coast of North Africa from 31 July to 3 August and at Cádiz from 5 to 7 August. They then set course for the United Kingdom, reaching Plymouth, England, in mid-August. They subsequently visited Brest in France, Ferrol, and the Canary Islands before proceeding to West Africa, where they called at Dakar in Senegal and Villa Cisneros in Río de Oro. They then returned to the Canary Islands for a stop at Las Palmas on Gran Canaria and called at Larache in Spanish Morocco before concluding the cruise with their arrival at Cartagena in September 1935.

C-3 was one of several submarines that took part in maneuvers in the Canary Islands during the first half of May 1936. She returned to Cartagena upon their completion.

=== Spanish Civil War ===
On 17 July 1936, the Spanish Civil War began, with Nationalist forces under Francisco Franco opposing Republican forces which remained loyal to the Second Spanish Republic. At the time, C-3 was at Cartagena as a unit of the Cartagena division. Early on 18 July, the division received orders from the Republican government to patrol the Mediterranean along the Andalusian coast between Cabo de Gata and the Strait of Gibraltar to intercept ships carrying Nationalist troops and equipment from North Africa to Spain. C-3, Isaac Peral, C-4, and C-6 got underway immediately, rendezvoused at sea with the submarine B-6, and began the patrol. They took up a patrol line along the Andalusian coast, and the other submarines of the Cartagena division joined them over the following days.

It quickly became apparent that most of the division's officers supported the Nationalists while the crews supported the Republicans, so the crews mutinied and placed most of the officers under arrest. Only two days into the operation, on 20 July, the submarine division entered the harbor at Málaga, where the division's commander, Capitán de fragata (Frigate Captain) Francisco Guimerá Bosch, C-3′s commanding officer, Capitán de corbeta (Corvette Captain) Javier de Salas Pinto, C-3's executive officer, Teniente de navío (Ship-of-the-Line Lieutenant) Rafael Viniegra González, and most of the other senior officers in the division were relieved of command and transferred to the prison ship Monte Toro. Only the commanding officer of Isaac Peral, Capitán de corbeta (Corvette Captain) Lara, retained his command. (Later, Sala Pinto was killed aboard the prison ship España No. 3 on 15 August 1936.)

On the morning of 21 July 1936, C-3 and B-6 departed Málaga bound for Tangier to protect the oil tanker Ophir. On 27 July, all destroyers and submarines at Málaga deployed around Cádiz to intercept a Nationalist convoy that proved to be a decoy. Then C-3, C-2, and C-6 received instructions to form a patrol arc along the coast of North Africa off the harbor at Ceuta to prevent the entrance of the Nationalist light cruiser Almirante Cervera, which had left Ferrol bound for the Strait of Gibraltar and was thought to be headed for Ceuta.

On 1 August 1936, C-3 took on anti-aircraft ammunition and torpedoes from C-4 at Málaga before C-4 departed for Cartagena for minor repairs. On 15 August, C-3 and C-6 got underway bound for the Cantabrian Sea along Spain's northern coast, but C-3 suffered a mechanical breakdown that forced her to return to Cartagena. C-3 set out again for northern Spain on 25 August in company with C-4 and C-5, with all three subnmarines carrying weapons and ammunition for Republican forces fighting there. During this operation, C-3 and C-6 jointly attempted to locate and sink Almirante Cervera and the Nationalist battleship España, but without success. C-3 also participated in a search for cargo ships bringing weapons to Bilbao for use by Nationalist forces. C-3 returned to the Mediterranean Sea on 2 October 1936 and arrived at Málaga on 8 October.

On 12 December 1936, C-3 was running on the surface in the Alboran Sea about four nautical miles (7.4 km; 4.6 mi) southeast of Málaga. In the conning tower was her commanding officer, Alférez de navío (Ship-of-the-Line Ensign) Antonio Arbona Pastor, and a merchant marine maritime pilot, García Viñas, attached to the Spanish Republican Navy. At 14:19, a sudden explosion occurred on her starboard bow, and she sank immediately. The coast guard vessel Xauen, lying two nautical miles (3.7 km; 2.3 mi) inshore of C-3, and the fishing boats Joven Antonio and Joven Amalia, about the same distance away, observed the explosion and sinking and found only three survivors — García Viñas, and the sailors Isidoro de la Orden Ibáñez and Asensio Lidón Jiménez — who had been topside dumping garbage overboard after a meal.

The Republicans claimed that an internal explosion sank C-3, but Nazi Germany actively supported the Nationalist faction, and the Germans reported that the German submarine U-34, commanded by Kapitänleutnant (Lieutenant Captain) Harald Grosse, had torpedoed C-3 as part of Operation Ursula, a secret deployment of German submarines to attack Republican forces. For this action, Grosse received the Goldenes Spanienkreuz (Spanish Golden Cross).

Over the next few days, Republican authorities attempted to locate C-3, but only found a large oil slick. Searchers marked the sinking's position with a buoy, but did not attempt a rescue, deeming it unlikely anyone was left alive aboard the sunken submarine. Subsequently, after Málaga fell to the Nationalists at the end of the Battle of Málaga in February 1937, C-3 was forgotten. The Nationalists, in an attempt to conceal the acquisition of two Italian Archimede-class submarines — General Mola (ex-Evangelista Torricelli) and General Sanjurjo, (ex-Archimede) — renamed them C-3 and C-5, claiming C-3 was raised and recommissioned by the Nationalist navy. The attempt at concealment was unsuccessful, because the Italian submarines bore distinct structural differences. C-3 finally was stricken from the naval register by order of the Ministry of the Navy on 31 July 1941.

== Discovery of wreck ==
In 1997, Antonio Checa, a lawyer from Málaga, discovered a shipwreck, believing it to be that of C-3. Despite several dives by a remotely operated vehicle with a video camera, it proved impossible to positively identify the wreck owing to bad visibility.

In October 1998, the Spanish Navy sent the submarine rescue ship Mar Rojo to the wreck site with a Spanish Navy dive team aboard. The divers identified the wreck as that of C-3, lying on a sand plain at position 36°40′N 4°21′W. The divers found C-3's hull had broken in two, with the smaller bow section eight metres (26 feet) from the rest of the wreck. The larger section sat upright on the seabed and the smaller section was inverted.

== Notes ==
=== Bibliography ===
- ABC (newspaper, in Spanish)
- Aguilera, Alfredo; Elías, Vicente (1980). Buques de guerra españoles, 1885-1971 [Spanish Warships, 1885–1971] (in Spanish). Madrid: Editorial San Martín.
- Cervera Pery, José (1988). La guerra naval española (1936-39) [The Spanish Naval War (1936–39)] (in Spanish). Madrid: Editorial San Martín.
- Chesneau, Roger, ed. (1980). Conway's All the World's Fighting Ships 1922–1946. Greenwich, UK: Conway Maritime Press. ISBN 0-85177-146-7.
- La Vanguardia newspaper (in Spanish)
- González, Marcelino (2009). 50 Barcos españoles [50 Spanish Ships] (in Spanish). Gijón, Spain: Fundación Alvargonzález.
- González, Marcelino (2012). Otros 50 Barcos españoles [Another 50 Spanish Ships] (in Spanish). Gijón, Spain: Fundación Alvargonzález.
