= Spanish submarine Isaac Peral (C-1) =

Spanish Navy submarine of 1928–1948

- Line drawing of Isaac Peral

History

Spain
- Name: C-1
- Builder: SECN, Cartagena, Spain
- Laid down: 19 July 1923
- Launched: 28 or 31 March 1927
- Commissioned: 18 July 1928
- Renamed: Isaac Peral, August 1930
- Namesake: Isaac Peral (1851–1895), Spanish submarine pioneer
- Decommissioned: late August 1948
- Stricken: 30 January 1950
- Identification: Pennant number C-1
- Fate: Sunk as target 1951

General characteristics (per Conway's 1922–1946)
- Class & type: C-class submarine
- Displacement: 916 long tons (931 t) surfaced; 1,290 long tons (1,311 t) submerged
- Length: 75.30 m (247 ft)
- Beam: 6.34 m (20 ft10 in)
- Draft: 4.10 m (13 ft 6 in)
- Installed power: 2,000 bhp (1,491 kW) diesel; 750 hp (559 kW) electric
- Propulsion: 2 × Vickers diesel engines; 2 × electric motors; 2 × screws
- Speed: 16 knots (30 km/h; 18 mph) surfaced; 8.5 knots (15.7 km/h; 9.8 mph) submerged
- Range: 4,000 nmi (4,600 mi; 7,400 km) surfaced; 125 nmi (144 mi; 232 km) at 4.5 knots (8.3 km/h; 5.2 mph) submerged
- Test depth: 79 m (260 ft)
- Complement: 46
- Armament: 6 × 533 mm (21 in) torpedo tubes (4 bow, 2 stern); 1 × 75 mm (3.0 in) anti-aircraft gun

General characteristics (per Todoavante))
- Class & type: C-class submarine
- Displacement: 915 long tons (930 t) surfaced; 1,150 long tons (1,168 t) submerged
- Length: 75.3 m (247 ft 1 in)
- Beam: 5.6 m (18 ft 4 in)
- Draft: 5.80 m (19 ft 0 in)
- Depth: 5.64 m (18 ft 6 in)
- Installed power: 2,000 bhp (1,491 kW) diesel; 750 hp (559 kW) electric
- Propulsion: 2 × 1,000 hp (746 kW) diesel engines; 2 × 375 hp (280 kW) electric motors; 2 × screws
- Speed: 16.5 knots (30.6 km/h; 19.0 mph) surfaced; 8.5 knots (15.7 km/h; 9.8 mph) submerged
- Range: 6,800 nmi (7,800 mi; 12,600 km) at 10 knots (19 km/h; 12 mph) surfaced; 3,200 nmi (3,700 mi; 5,900 km) at 16 knots (30 km/h; 18 mph) surfaced; 150 nmi (170 mi; 280 km) at 4.5 knots (8.3 km/h; 5.2 mph) submerged
- Test depth: 80 m (262 ft)
- Complement: 40
- Armament: 6 × 533 mm (21 in) torpedo tubes (4 bow, 2 stern); 10 × Whitehead torpedoes; 1 × 76 mm (3 in) deck gun; 1 × "detachable antiaircraft gun"

Isaac Peral (C-1), originally named C-1, was the lead ship of the Spanish Navy's C-class submarines. She was in commission from 1928 to 1948. She served initially under the Kingdom of Spain, then as a unit of the Spanish Republican Navy under the Second Spanish Republic. She took part in the Spanish Civil War on the side of the Republican faction loyal to the government of the Second Spanish Republic. After the war, she became part of the naval forces of Francoist Spain.

Originally numbered simply C-1, the submarine was renamed Isaac Peral in 1930 in honor of Isaac Peral (1851–1895), a Spanish submarine pioneer. She was the second Spanish Navy vessel to bear the name and the only C-class submarine to receive a name.

== Construction and commissioning ==
In 1915, the Spanish Cortes Generales passed the Miranda Law, a naval construction program which called for a Spanish Navy force that included 28 submarines. Shortages during World War I (1914–1918) and budgetary limitations led to delays in the program, but a new naval law passed on 11 January 1922 authorized the construction of the six C-class submarines. The Sociedad Española de Construcción Naval (SECN) built all six of the submarines at Cartagena, Spain.

C-1 was the lead ship of the class. SECN laid her keel on 19 July 1923 and launched her on either 28 March or 31 March 1927, according to different sources. She was commissioned on 18 July 1928 with Capitán de corbeta (Corvette Captain) Francisco Regalado Rodríguez — a future almirante (admiral) — in command.

== Service history ==
=== Kingdom of Spain, 1928–1931 ===
Upon commissioning, C-1 was assigned to the Cartagena submarine squadron. She got underway from Cartagena in late July 1928 as part of a flotilla that also included her sister ship C-2 and all six B-class submarines. The flotilla proceeded to the Cantabrian Sea to conduct maneuvers off Spain's northern coast. On 8 August 1928, the Spanish royal family boarded C-1 while C-1 was making dives near Santander. After completing the maneuvers, the submarine flotilla made stops at Ferrol, Marín, and Vigo on the Spanish mainland and Ceuta on the coast of North Africa before returning to Cartagena on 26 September 1928.

The submarines conducted maneuvers with the Spanish fleet in the Mediterranean Sea during October and November 1928 and made a port call at Palma de Mallorca on Mallorca in the Balearic Islands in early November. Upon the conclusion of the maneuvers, they proceeded to Barcelona, arriving there during the second week of November 1928.

In May 1929, C-1, C-2, and their sister ship C-3 attended two World's Fair exhibitions which Spain hosted collectively as the General Spanish Exhibition, visiting the Ibero-American Exposition of 1929 in Seville and the 1929 Barcelona International Exposition in Barcelona. The three submarines and their sister ship C-4 took part in fleet maneuvers in the Mediterranean Sea during September and October 1929.

In August 1930, C-1 was named Isaac Peral, the second Spanish Navy submarine to bear the name and the only C-class submarine to receive a name, although she retained "C-1" as her pennant number. In mid-August 1930, all six C-class submarines — the last two vessels of the class, C-5 and C-6, having joined the fleet during 1930 — arrived in Ferrol from Cartagena and then participated in maneuvers in the Cantabrian Sea during September and October 1930. After returning to Cartagena, the submarines took part in more exercises. Escorted by the gunboat Laya and torpedo boat No. 20, Isaac Peral and C-2 got underway from Cartagena in early November 1930 bound for Mahón on Menorca in the Balearic Islands and subsequently carried out a variety of exercises in the waters of the Balearics. Both submarines entered dry dock at Mahón in February 1931 to have their hulls cleaned.

=== Second Spanish Republic, 1931–1936 ===
On 14 April 1931, the Second Spanish Republic was proclaimed, replacing the Kingdom of Spain. The Spanish Navy came under the republic's control as the Spanish Republican Navy.

In 1933, Isaac Peral, C-3, C-4, C-5, and the submarines Narciso Monturiol (A-1) and B-5 conducted maneuvers off Tarragona. They arrived at Castellón on 29 September 1933 at the end of a voyage from Vinaròs, then got back underway to continue their training cruise, which lasted until the end of October 1933. All six C-class submarines took part in fleet maneuvers during May and June 1934.

On 29 July 1935, the six C-class submarines departed Cartagena to begin a lengthy training cruise. They called at Melilla on the coast of North Africa from 31 July to 3 August and at Cádiz from 5 to 7 August. They then set course for the United Kingdom, reaching Plymouth, England, in mid-August. They subsequently visited Brest in France, Ferrol, and the Canary Islands before proceeding to West Africa, where they called at Dakar in Senegal and Villa Cisneros in Río de Oro. They then returned to the Canary Islands for a stop at Las Palmas on Gran Canaria and called at Larache in Spanish Morocco before concluding the cruise with their arrival at Cartagena in September 1935.

Isaac Peral took part in maneuvers in the Canary Islands in April and May 1936. She returned to Cartagena upon their completion.

=== Spanish Civil War, 1936–1939 ===
On 17 July 1936, the Spanish Civil War began, with Nationalist forces under Francisco Franco opposing Republican forces which remained loyal to the Second Spanish Republic. At the time, Isaac Peral was at Cartagena, serving as the flagship of the Cartagena division. Early on 18 July, the division received orders from the Republican government to patrol the Mediterranean between Cabo de Gata and the Strait of Gibraltar to intercept ships carrying Nationalist troops and equipment from North Africa to Spain. Isaac Peral, C-3, C-4, and C-6 got underway immediately, rendezvoused at sea with the submarine B-6, and took up a patrol line along the Andalusian coast. The other submarines of the Cartagena division joined them over the following days. Isaac Peral intercepted the merchant ship Monte Toro and, despite finding that she carried neither troops or equipment, seized her and took her to Málaga for use as a prison ship.

It quickly became apparent that most of the division's officers supported the Nationalists while the crews supported the Republicans, so the crews mutinied and placed most of the officers under arrest. Only two days into the operation, on 20 July, the submarine division entered the harbor at Málaga, where the division's commander, Capitán de fragata (Frigate Captain) Francisco Guimerá Bosch, and most of the other senior officers in the division were relieved of command and transferred to the prison ship Monte Toro. Isaac Peral′s commanding officer was the only one that remained in command of his submarine. The division's operations officer assumed command of the division.

In mid-August 1936, Isaac Peral escorted the battleship Jaime I from Málaga to Cartagena after Jaime I sustained damage in a Nationalist air attack. The Soviet Union supported the Republican faction, and in August a Soviet Navy officer took command of Isaac Peral with orders to deploy to Spain's northern coast. Isaac Peral and C-2 made port in North Africa at Tangier, where C-5 later joined them. While the submarines were leaving the harbor at Tangier to proceed to the northern coast of Spain, C-5 collided with Isaac Peral, which suffered hull damage and had to put in at Cartagena for repairs.

Isaac Peral called at Málaga from 18 to 21 August, then escorted the destroyer Alcalá Galiano, which was tasked with blockading Huelva. Isaac Peral was at Málaga again on 22 August 1936 when she suffered damage to her sternpost and aft diving planes during a Nationalist air attack. In late August 1936, she was towed to Cartagena for repairs, which took seven months.

Isaac Peral's repairs were completed in March 1937. On 29 March 1937 another Soviet Navy officer took command, and on 30 March Isaac Peral and C-4 got underway from Cartagena to intercept ships arriving from Fascist Italy, which supported the Nationalist faction. The submarines had no success, and returned to Cartagena in early April 1937. The two submarines again put to sea on 13 April 1937 to deploy to the Cantabrian Sea off the northern coast of Spain, but Isaac Peral suffered a diesel engine breakdown near the Strait of Gibraltar, and they both returned to Cartagena.

In June 1937, a Spanish officer took command of Isaac Peral. She was at Valencia when she experienced mechanical problems that forced her to return to Cartagena. After repairs, she made a several patrols in the Mediterranean Sea. On 20 March 1938, she began conducting patrols from Barcelona. A Soviet Navy officer took command of her in April 1938. While she was diving near Almería in mid-September 1938, her control room flooded, forcing her to proceed to Cartagena for repairs.

After completion of repairs, Isaac Peral departed Cartagena on 3 October 1938 and made for Barcelona, which she reached on 8 October with orders to begin patrols between Barcelona and Cartagena. While she was in port at Barcelona, however, a bomb struck her during a Nationalist air attack on the night of 8–9 October, sinking her. She was refloated on 15 October 1938 and towed to the Nuevo Vulcano shipyard, where she was drydocked for repairs. Barcelona fell to Nationalist forces on 26 January 1939, and the Nationalists captured her while she was still in dry dock. The Spanish Civil War ended on 1 April 1939 in a Nationalist victory.

=== Francoist Spain, 1939–1948 ===
After the Spanish Civil War, Isaac Peral became part of the naval forces of Francoist Spain. According to one source, she was not repaired after her capture in 1939 and was scrapped in 1948.

Another source provides a different account of Isaac Peral's post-civil war career. It claims that she served as a training ship after the conclusion of the civil war and underwent a major overhaul in 1941. It also claims that she was disarmed in late August 1948 and designated for use as a target ship, then was stricken from the naval register on 30 January 1950 and sunk as a target off Spain's Atlantic coast near Tambo Island during an exercise in 1951.
