= Line drawing =

Line drawing may mean:

- Line art, a style of two-dimensional art featuring only two, unshaded, contrasting colors
- Technical line drawing, simple two-dimensional blueprint or technical drawing
- Line drawing algorithm, in computer graphics

== See also ==
- Box-drawing character, also known as a line-drawing character
