= Sociedad Española de Construcción Naval =

From 1909 until the Spanish Civil War, naval construction in Spain was monopolized by the Sociedad Española de Construcción Naval (SECN; 'Spanish Society for Naval Construction'). During this time the majority of its shares were owned by the United Kingdom firm (John Brown and Vickers-Armstrong), and therefore almost all ships built by the company were developed after Royal Navy designs.

== History ==
Ten years after the Spanish–American War of 1898, in which Spain lost Cuba Puerto Rico, Guam, and the Philippines, the Antonio Maura Government, in an attempt to restore the Spanish Navy and Spanish shipbuilding industry, hired the Spanish Society for Naval Construction, whose major investors were a British-Spanish-Association taking contracts In the following proportions: 40% Vickers Sons and Maxim, 30% the Marquis of Comillas of the Spanish Transatlantic Company, 30% the Biscay Furnace Company, all the previously state owned shipbuilding yards, workshops, foundries and dry docks at Ferrol were handed over to the technical expertise of some of finest British shipbuilder companies: John Brown, Vickers and Armstrong now in charge of building the new Spanish Fleet.

For a period of sixteen years, all the technicians were exclusively British, and the situation was not altered till 1925 when the management was taken over by Spanish engineers, as one of the new policies introduced by the then newly created government, including ministers both civil and military, of the dictator Miguel Primo de Rivera (1923–1930). The arrival of the British coincided with the construction of a local electric-powered trolley streetcar's line (1924–1961).

In sight of the outbreak of the Spanish Civil War, and because there was fear of social unrest in the naval station, the Foreign Office in London, organized a ship to repatriate all the remaining British citizens and on 22 July 1936 HMS Witch (D89) departed from Ferrol back to Britain.

Many British technical advisors continued to work in the Spanish shipbuilding yards, workshops, foundries and dry docks (on both sides) during the war.

Between 1958 and 1960, SECN built 23 electric railcars and 12 trailers for use on metre gauge railways operated by FEVE.

== Sites of SECN Shipyards and Iron-works in Spain between 1909 and 1936/45 ==
- Ferrol
- Gijon
- Bilbao
- Valencia
- Cartagena
- Cádiz

== See also ==
- Vickers-Armstrong
- Racing Club de Ferrol
