= Spanish submarine Cosme García (A-2) =

Spanish Navy submarine of 1917–1931

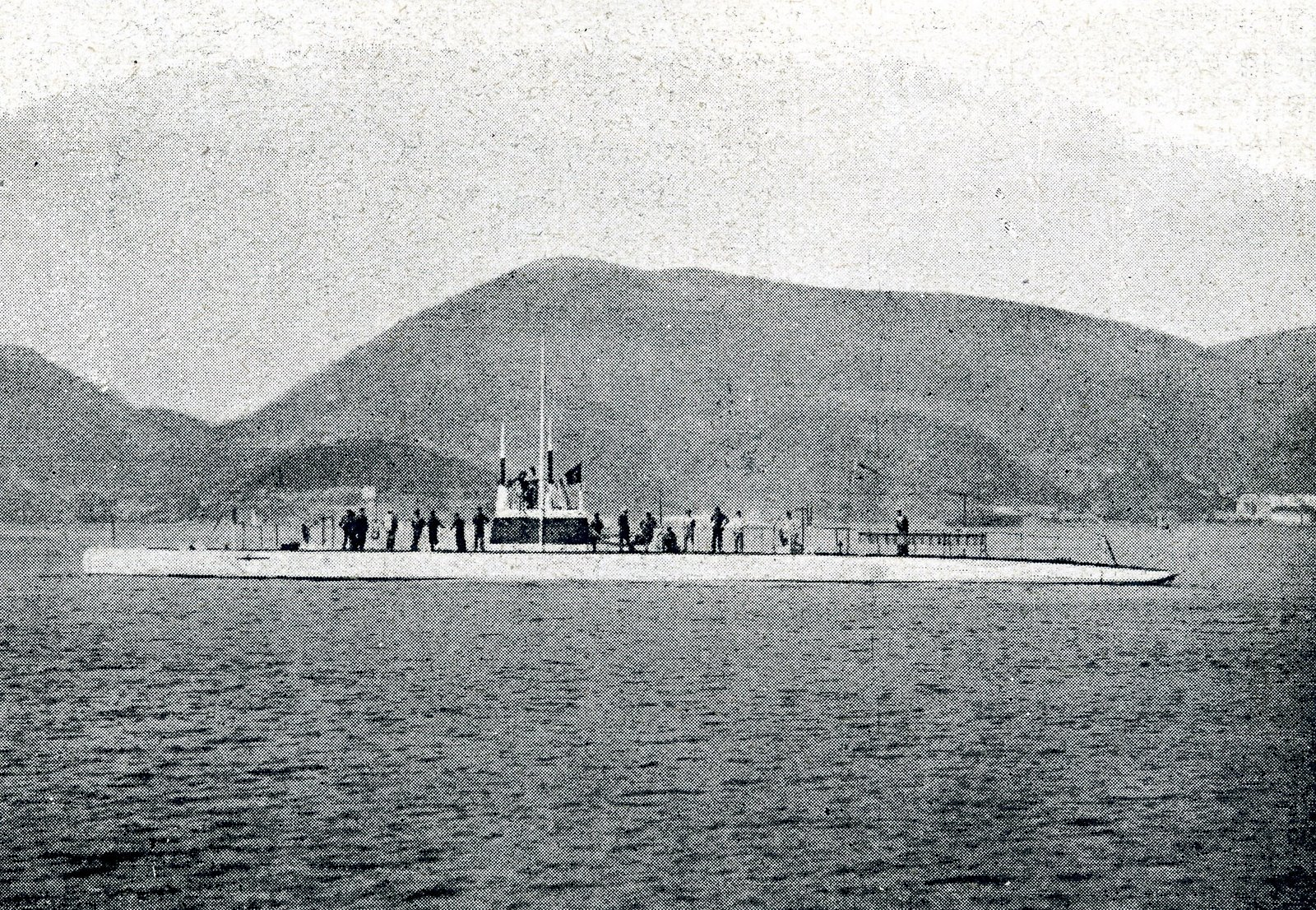
- Cosme García (A-2) in 1917.

History

Spain
- Name: Cosme García
- Namesake: Cosme García Sáez (1818–1874), Spanish submarine pioneer
- Builder: FIAT-San Giorgio, La Spezia, Italy
- Laid down: 9 September 1915
- Launched: 17 June 1917
- Commissioned: 25 August 1917
- Stricken: 17 December 1931
- Identification: Pennant number A-2
- Fate: Scrapped

General characteristics
- Class & type: A-class submarine
- Displacement: 262 long tons (266 t) (surfaced); 319 long tons (324 t) (submerged)
- Length: 45.6 m (149 ft 7 in) (overall); 45.1 m (148 ft 0 in) (between perpendiculars)
- Beam: 4.2 m (13 ft 9 in)
- Draught: 3.1 m (10 ft 2 in)
- Propulsion: 2 × 670 bhp (500 kW) Fiat diesel engines; 2 × 500 hp (373 kW) Savigliano electric motors; 2 x shafts; 15 tons diesel fuel
- Speed: 12.5 knots (23.2 km/h; 14.4 mph) (surfaced); 8.2 knots (15.2 km/h; 9.4 mph) (submerged)
- Range: 1,600 nmi (3,000 km; 1,800 mi) at 8.5 knots (15.7 km/h; 9.8 mph) (surfaced); 80 nmi (150 km; 92 mi) at 4 knots (7.4 km/h; 4.6 mph) (submerged)
- Test depth: 45 metres (148 feet)
- Complement: 26 (2 officers, 24 men)
- Armament: 2 × 450 mm (17.7 in) torpedo tubes (2 bow); 4 x torpedoes; 1 × 76 mm (3 in) deck gun
- Notes: SOURCE:

Cosme García (A-2) was a Spanish Navy A-class submarine commissioned in 1917. She was one of three Italian F-class submarines constructed in Italy for the Spanish Navy. One of the first four operational submarines the Spanish Navy acquired, she served for most of her service life under the Kingdom of Spain, playing a role in the Rif War in 1922. In 1927 she experienced the first serious accident in the history of the Spanish Submarine Force. She briefly was a unit of the Spanish Republican Navy under the Second Spanish Republic in 1931 before she was stricken from the navy list that year.

The Spanish Navy named Cosme García in honor of Cosme García Sáez (1818–1874), a Spanish inventor who claimed that he invented the first submersible.

== Construction and commissioning ==
In 1915, the Spanish Cortes Generales passed the Miranda Law, a naval construction program which called for a Spanish Navy force that included 28 submarines. It authorized the construction of the navy's first four operational submarines, which also were the navy's first submarines since the 19th century, as well as a submarine rescue ship. The Ministry of the Navy contracted with the Fore River Shipyard in the United States to build one of the new submarines, which became Isaac Peral (A-0). For the other three, it turned to Italy, purchasing three Italian F-class submarines from the FIAT-San Giorgio shipyard in La Spezia. The three Italian-built vessels became the Spanish Navy's A-class submarines.

Cosme García (A-2) was laid down at La Spezia on 9 September 1915 with the Italian designation F23. She was launched on 17 June 1917. The shipyard delivered Cosme García and her sister ships Narcíso Monturiol (A-1) and A-3 at La Spezia on 25 August 1917 and the Spanish Navy commissioned all three submarines the same day, with Cosme García receiving the pennant number A–2.

== Service history ==
=== 1917–1921 ===
Cosme García alongside the protected cruiser Extremadura, which operated as a submarine tender between 1917 and 1920. Another A-class submarine is astern of Cosme García.

After their commissioning, the three A-class submarines made a cruise along the Italian coast from La Spezia to Genoa under the overall command of Narcíso Monturiol′s commanding officer — Capitán de corbeta (Corvette Captain) Mateo García de los Reyes, a future contralmirante (counter admiral) and minister of the navy — who had taken command of the Spanish Navy's Submarine Division on 25 August 1917. They tested their equipment and conducted diving tests during the voyage. After a few days at Genoa, where they completed fitting out, they got underway on 2 September 1917 for their delivery voyage to Spain. The protected cruiser Extremadura — which served as the Spanish Navy's submarine tender from 1917 until the submarine rescue ship Kanguro arrived in Spain and took over the role in December 1920 — escorted the flotilla on its voyage. The three submarines and Extremadura arrived in Spain at Tarragona on 4 September 1917. They departed Tarragona on 8 September 1917 and proceeded to the submarine base at the Cartagena Naval Base in Cartagena. All four Spanish Navy submarines — the three A-class submarines and Isaac Peral — then made a cruise along the Spanish coast, visiting various ports to display themselves and their capabilities to the Spanish public.

On the night of 18 January 1919 the three A-class submarines arrived at Barcelona in company with the battleship Alfonso XIII and the torpedo boat No. 18 after a voyage from Cartagena. During the summer of 1919 all four Spanish submarines undertook their first extended cruise, accompanied by Extremadura. During this cruise, they conducted exercises off Chipiona, then called at Sanlúcar de Barrameda, Vigo, Ferrol, and Gijón before arriving at Santander on 18 August 1919. While at Santander, they put to sea under escort by the destroyers Bustamante and Proserpina on 22 August and conducted maneuvers off Cabo Mayor during the day with King Alfonso XIII aboard Narciso Monturiol. The submarines and Extremadure arrived at San Sebastián under escort by the gunboat Marqués de la Victoria on the afternoon of 25 August for an overnight stop. They got back underway on 26 August and proceeded to Pasajes, where they conducted maneuvers. They subsequently visited Bilbao and Gijón on the northern coast of Spain and Lisbon in Portugal. Except for A-3, which remained in Vigo for repairs until December 1919, the vessels returned to Cartagena in September 1919.

Under the command of García de los Reyes, now a capitán de fragata (frigate captain), the submarine flotilla and its escorts — the destroyer Audaz and the torpedo boats No. 1 and No. 4 — made a training voyage in the Mediterranean Sea in June 1920. The vessels arrived at Mahón on Menorca in the Balearic Islands on 5 June. They stopped at Alicante, then reached Almería on 14 June. They got back underway on the morning of 18 June and headed for the coast of North Africa, where they visited Melilla and Ceuta before arriving at Cartagena. A royal order of 21 December 1920 reorganized the Spanish submarine force, creating a submarine training division consisting of Isaac Peral, the three A-class submarines, Kanguro, and two torpedo boats.

In 1921, the submarine flotilla undertook a training voyage to the Canary Islands in which it departed Cartagena on 21 April, called at Cádiz, and then set course for Lanzarote. They visited several ports in the Canaries, then stopped at Cádiz and Ceuta before returning to Cartagena on 6 June 1921.

In September 1921, the submarine training division conducted a training cruise in the Mediterranean Sea under García de los Reyes's overall command. After departing Cartagena, the three A-class submarines, Isaac Peral, Kanguro, and the torpedo boats No. 1, No. 3, No. 21, and No. 22 visited Alicante and Gandía before calling at Valencia from 8 to 9 September. They then made a stop at Vinaròs before proceeding to Barcelona.

The Barcelona visit lasted a week, and took place to allow Minister of the Navy José Gómez Acedo and the chief of the naval staff, Vicealmirante (Vice Admiral) Salvador Buhigas, to review the Spanish Navy's submarine and torpedo boat flotillas and demonstrate for them the navy's newest acquisitions. Kanguro arrived at Barcelona on the afternoon of 12 September 1921, followed by Isaac Peral, Narciso Monturiol, Cosme García, and A-3 and then by the torpedo boats No. 1, No. 5, No. 21, and No. 22. There to meet them were the troopship Almirante Lobo — which had arrived at Barcelona on the afternoon of 11 September 1921 carrying two seaplanes of the Spanish Naval Air Arm — as well as Audaz and the protected cruiser Río de la Plata. What followed were the Spanish Navy's first sea-and-air exercises.

Amidst a thick fog that later dissipated, the two flotillas got underway at 09:30 on 13 September 1921 to begin maneuvers. With crowds looking on from shore and aboard private boats, Kanguro and the torpedo boats left port first, followed later by Almirante Lobo and the submarines. Two seaplanes also took off, and a tethered balloon was launched. Kanguro stood by while the submarines carried out various activities during the day.

On the morning of 19 September, Kanguro weighed anchor and led the squadron out of the harbor, followed by the submarines and then the torpedo boats. Almirante Lobo and Audaz accompanied them. With Gómez Acedo and Buhigas embarked on Narciso Monturiol, the vessels conducted diving maneuvers and antisubmarine warfare exercises with naval aircraft. The activities concluded later in the morning, and Gómez Acedo and Buhigas transferred from Narciso Monturiol to Audaz and then to Río de la Plata. Meanwhile, the submarine training division and its escorts resumed their training cruise later in the day, next visiting Mahón before calling at Valencia again and then returning to Cartagena.

The submarine flotilla completed a voyage from Cartagena to Almería on 25 October 1921. It returned to Cartagena on 26 October.

=== 1922–1927 ===
In late July 1922, Cosme García played a role in the Rif War, which had broken out in 1921, pitting Spanish forces against Berber tribes in Spanish Morocco. Escorted by the battleship España, Cosme García and Isaac Peral departed Málaga to bring fresh water to the Spanish garrison on Peñón de Alhucemas, a Spanish-held islet in the Alhucemas Islands which was under siege by Riffian forces. After completing the mission, the three vessels arrived at Melilla on 26 July 1922.

By August 1922, the Spanish Navy's submarine flotilla consisted of the three A-class submarines, Isaac Peral, and the new B-class submarines B-1, B-2, and B-3. All seven submarines departed Cartagena on 26 August 1922 and made a stop at Ceuta. Leaving A-3 behind to undergo repairs and rejoin them later, the other submarines got back underway on 28 August bound for San Sebastián, where in September 1922 the submarine flotilla took part in commemorative events marking the 400th anniversary of the completion of the first circumnavigation of the world, begun in 1519 by the Portuguese explorer Ferdinand Magellan and completed after Magellan's death by the Spanish navigator, shipowner, and explorer Juan Sebastián Elcano in 1522. The Spanish royal family visited the submarine flotilla when it called at Pasajes. After the royal visit, the submarine flotilla conducted exercises and made port calls at Ferrol, Marín, and Vigo. On 25 September 1922, Cosme García, A-3, Isaac Peral, B-1, B-2, B-3, and the tug Cíclope arrived at Cádiz. The same vessels departed Cádiz on 4 October 1922 in company with Kanguro and proceeded to Cartagena.

Cosme García under repair at Barcelona, Spain, sometime prior to 1927.

With King Alfonso XIII observing from aboard the destroyer Villaamil, the submarine flotilla conducted maneuvers in the Mediterranean Sea off Cartagena in March 1923. Later in 1923, the Spanish Navy reorganized its submarine force, creating a submarine division based at Mahón made up of Cosme García and Narcíso Monturiol and a training division based at Cartagena consisting of Isaac Peral, A-3, B-1, B-2, B-3, and the submarine B-4. In October 1923, Cosme García, Narcíso Monturiol, and the torpedo boat No. 6 conducted training exercises off Mahón. The two submarines arrived in Barcelona on 12 October 1923 in company with No. 6 to undergo repairs. With them complete, the two submarines and No. 6 put back to sea on 28 November 1923 bound for Mahón.

Cosme García and Narcíso Monturiol completed a refit at Barcelona on 3 February 1925, departing soon thereafter to return to their base at Mahón. Both submarines had their hulls cleaned at Barcelona in July 1925 and again returned to their base at Mahón, accompanied by the torpedo boat No. 6. They both underwent repairs in dry dock at Barcelona in December 1925.

=== 1927 accident ===
Escorted by the torpedo boat No. 6, Cosme García and Narciso Monturiol arrived at Barcelona on 10 April 1927 after a voyage from Mahón to begin a two-month stay in dry dock there for their annual repairs and maintenance. Cosme García entered dry dock on 19 April. After the completion of her repairs, she was refloated, and on 28 June 1927 began post-refit testing and trials. That morning she tested her diesel engines, then moored at a pier. That afternoon, her crew attempted a pierside test of her starboard torpedo tube′s firing valves by flooding the tube and then clearing it with a blast of compressed air. However, when they opened the outer tube door to flood the tube at 14:14, the locking mechanism designed to prevent both the outer and inner doors from opening at the same time malfunctioned, and the inner door suddenly burst open as well, allowing a massive amount of water to flood into the torpedo room. The crewmen in the torpedo room closed the hatch to the officer's quarters astern of the torpedo room and then tried to close the inner torpedo tube door, but the force of the inrushing water was too great. They then tried to close the outer door, but had only partial success. With the flooding out of control and the water at chest level, the crew closed the bow and torpedo-loading hatches, sealed the watertight compartments, disconnected the batteries, and then abandoned ship without loss of life, closing the stern and conning tower hatches as they left. Cosme García sank slowly by the bow with a slight list to port.

Salvage operations for Cosme García at Barcelona on 28–29 June 1927.

With Cosme García′s bow resting on the harbor bottom and her stern still afloat, harbor authorities and Spanish Navy ships in the vicinity began salvage efforts. Two floating cranes — one of 60 and the other of 80 tons — lifted and stabilized Cosme García as salvors began to hear internal explosions aboard her and observe bubbles of gas and yellowish smoke reaching the surface. After a diver made an unsuccessful attempt to close the outer torpedo tube door, the salvors decided to hoist Cosme García′s bow out of the water to allow access to the torpedo tube doors. This allowed them to pump the water out of the submarine. The air inside the submarine had become unbreathable due to a concentration of chlorine gas emitted by the batteries upon contact with seawater, but once the water level had dropped sufficiently, Cosme García crewmen wearing gas masks provided by the seaplane carrier Dédalo, which was moored at Barcelona, undertook the risky effort of entering Cosme García and closing the inner torpedo tube door. Despite their gas masks, some of the men showed symptoms of chlorine gas poisoning after emerging from the submarine and received assistance by medical personnel from Dédalo.

With the inner torpedo tube door closed, the two cranes repositioned Cosme García horizontally. On the morning of 29 June 1927, they lowered Cosme García onto the water, and at 06:00 she came to rest almost at her normal buoyancy line and with a slight list to port. At midday, Cosme García was towed to a floating dry dock, where she rested while breathable air gradually returned to her interior.

The incident was the first serious accident in the history of the Spanish Submarine Force. An investigation into it discovered a defect in the locking system meant to prevent the opening of both torpedo tube doors simultaneously. The Spanish Navy took prompt action to correct the defect.

=== 1928–1931 ===
In 1928, A-3 replaced Cosme García in the submarine division at Mahón. In August 1929, the Spanish Navy established a submarine squadron at the Mahón naval base consisting of Isaac Peral, Narcíso Monturiol, Cosme García, and A-3. The submarines arrived at Mahón on 6 August 1929. The torpedo boat No. 6 accompanied them, as did the troopship Almirante Lobo, which brought the crews' families to Mahón. The squadron held its annual maneuvers in the Mediterranean Sea between mid-September and mid-October 1929. In early March 1930, the Spanish Navy disbanded the Mahón submarine squadron, and the submarines returned to Cartagena.

On 14 April 1931, the Second Spanish Republic was proclaimed, replacing the Kingdom of Spain. The Spanish Navy came under the republic's control as the Spanish Republican Navy.

== Disposal ==
Cosme García was stricken from the navy list on 17 December 1931. She subsequently was scrapped.
