= Spanish submarine B-4 =

Spanish Navy submarine of 1923–1941

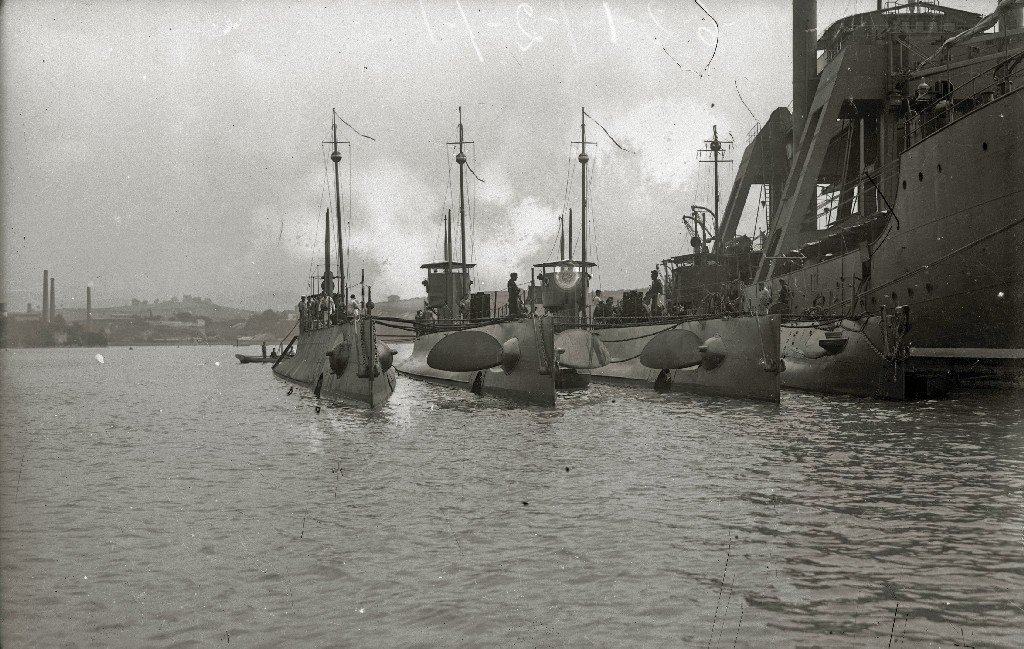
- B-class submarines alongside the submarine rescue ship Kanguro in Pasaia Bay in 1922.

History

Spain
- Name: B-4
- Builder: SECN, Cartagena, Spain
- Laid down: 9 May 1920
- Launched: 31 October 1922
- Commissioned: 28 May 1923
- Decommissioned: 31 July 1941
- Identification: Pennant number B-4
- Fate: Sold for scrapping

General characteristics (per Conway's 1906–1921)
- Class & type: B-class submarine
- Displacement: 491 long tons (499 t) surfaced; 715 long tons (726 t) submerged
- Length: 62.5 m (205 ft) pp; 64.1 m (210 ft 4 in) oa
- Beam: 5.6 m (17 ft 4 in)
- Draft: 3.4 m (11 ft 3 in)
- Installed power: 1,400 bhp (1,044 kW) diesel; 850 hp (634 kW) electric
- Propulsion: 2 × NELSECO diesel engines; 2 × electric motors; 2 × screws
- Speed: 16 knots (30 km/h; 18 mph) surfaced; 10 knots (19 km/h; 12 mph) submerged
- Range: 8,000 nmi (15,000 km; 9,200 mi) at 10.5 knots (19.4 km/h; 12.1 mph) surfaced; 125 nmi (232 km; 144 mi) at 4.5 knots (8.3 km/h; 5.2 mph) submerged
- Complement: 28
- Armament: 4 × 457 mm (18 in) torpedo tubes (2 bow, 2 stern); 1 × 3 in (76 mm) deck gun

General characteristics (per Todoavante))
- Class & type: B-class submarine
- Displacement: 564 long tons (573 t) surfaced; 716 long tons (727 t) submerged
- Length: 64.18 m (210 ft 7 in)
- Beam: 5.6 m (18 ft 4 in)
- Draft: 3.44 m (11 ft 3 in) (mean)
- Depth: 5.1 m (16 ft 9 in)
- Installed power: 1,400 bhp (1,044 kW) diesel; 420 hp (313 kW) electric
- Propulsion: 2 × 700 hp (522 kW) diesel engines; 2 × 210 hp (157 kW) electric motors; 2 × screws
- Speed: 16.22 knots (30.04 km/h; 18.67 mph) surfaced; 10.5 knots (19.4 km/h; 12.1 mph) submerged
- Range: 2,600 nmi (3,000 mi; 4,800 km) at 16 knots (30 km/h; 18 mph) surfaced; 4,900 nmi (5,600 mi; 9,100 km) at 10.5 knots (19.4 km/h; 12.1 mph) surfaced; 10 nmi (12 mi; 19 km) at 10.5 knots (19.4 km/h; 12.1 mph) submerged; 90 nmi (100 mi; 170 km) at 4.5 knots (8.3 km/h; 5.2 mph) submerged
- Test depth: 60 m (197 ft)
- Complement: As built: 28; From 1934: 34
- Armament: 4 × 450 mm (17.7 in) torpedo tubes (2 bow, 2 stern); 8 × Whitehead X-150 torpedoes; 1 × 76 mm (3 in) antiaircraft gun

B-4 was a Spanish Navy B-class submarine in commission from 1923 to 1941. She served initially under the Kingdom of Spain, then was a unit of the Spanish Republican Navy under the Second Spanish Republic. She took part in the Spanish Civil War on the side of the Republican faction loyal to the government of the Second Spanish Republic. Never seaworthy again after the war, she became part of the naval forces of Francoist Spain, which decommissioned her and sold her for scrapping in 1940.

== Construction and commissioning ==
On 15 February 1915, the Spanish Cortes Generales passed the Miranda Law, a naval construction program which called for a Spanish Navy force that included 28 submarines. Shortages during World War I (1914–1918) and budgetary limitations led to delays in the program, and none of the B-class submarines entered service until the 1920s. The Sociedad Española de Construcción Naval (SECN) built all six of the submarines at Cartagena, Spain. Originally, the Spanish Navy planned to name them A-4 through A-9.

B-4 was the fourth submarine of the class. SECN laid her keel on 9 May 1920 and launched her on 31 October 1922. She was commissioned on 28 May 1923.

== Service history ==
=== Kingdom of Spain, 1923–1931 ===
In 1923, the Spanish Navy reorganized its submarine force, creating a submarine division based at Mahón on Menorca in the Balearic Islands made up of the submarines Cosme Garcia (A-2) and Narciso Monturiol (A-1) and a training division based at Cartagena consisting of B-4, her sister ships B-1, B-2, and B-3, and the submarines Isaac Peral (A-0) and A-3. B-1, B-2, B-3, B-4, and Isaac Peral carried out a training cruise off Catalonia and in the Balearic Islands between 14 September and 14 October 1923 and called at Alicante in mid-October 1923.

King Alfonso XIII, Queen Victoria Eugenie, and Prime Minister Miguel Primo de Rivera embarked on the battleship Jaime I on 15 November 1923 and departed for Italy on 16 November accompanied by the Trasmediterránea mail steamer Rey Jaime I — which was carrying the royal entourage — and escorted by B-1, B-2, B-3, B-4, the battleship Alfonso XIII, the light cruiser Reina Victoria Eugenia, and the destroyers Cadarso and Villaamil. During the voyage to Italy, the royal convoy encountered a severe storm, during which B-4 also experienced engine trouble. During the storm, three of B-4′s crewmen jumped into the water to assist a small boat in distress and then swam back to B-4, and for their actions the three sailors received the Bronze Medal of Military Valor and a teniente (lieutenant) aboard B-4 received the Silver Medal of Military Valor. The royal family disembarked at La Spezia, Italy. On 21 November, the squadron anchored at Naples, Italy. After the completion of the royal visit, the squadron returned to Spain, arriving at Barcelona on 1 December and at Cartagena on 14 December 1923.

In early September 1924, B-2 and B-4 got underway from the Balearic Islands for a deployment to the coast of Spanish Morocco, where the Rif War between Spanish forces and Riffian Berber tribes had raged since 1921.

During 1927, B-2, B-3, and B-4 joined the Ferrol submarine division based at A Graña, which previously had consisted only of B-1 and Isaac Peral. Alfonso XIII and Victoria Eugenie embarked on Jaime I at Bilbao on 22 August 1927 and began a cruise escorted by several Spanish Navy vessels including B-4, B-3, and the submarine B-6. The cruise took the vessels to Galicia and Algeciras on the coast of Spain and then — after departing Algeciras on 5 October 1927 — to North Africa, where they stopped at Ceuta, Alhucemas, Villa Sanjurjo, and Melilla.

On 23 July 1928, B-4 arrived at Cádiz in company with B-3, B-4, the submarines C-1 and C-2, the motor launch C-16, and the tug Cíclope. In August and September 1928, B-1, B-2, B-3, B-4, B-6, C-1, C-2, and the submarine B-5 carried out maneuvers in the Cantabrian Sea along the northern coast of Spain. In October and November 1928, all eight of the submarines conducted maneuvers in the Mediterranean Sea under the overall command of Capitán de navío (Ship-of-the-Line Captain) Mateo García de los Reyes, a future contralmirante (counter admiral) and minister of the navy. During the maneuvers, García de los Reyes's flagship, the troopship Almirante Lobo, arrived at Palma de Mallorca on Mallorca in the Balearic Islands at midnight on 2 November 1928, and the eight submarines, as well as the submarine Isaac Peral, subsequently anchored there as well. With Isaac Peral as its flagship, the submarine squadron called at Barcelona from 11 November until the morning of 20 November 1928 for a crew rest period.

In May 1929, all six B-class submarines as well as C-1, C-2, and their sister ship C-3 attended the 1929 Barcelona International Exposition, arriving in Barcelona a few days before the exposition officially opened on 19 May. They remained at Barcelona until the last week of May. Accompanied by the tug Galicia, B-1, B-2, B-3, and B-4 anchored at Ferrol at the end of July 1929 to again form the Ferrol submarine division based at A Graña. B-4 took part in the annual squadron maneuvers in the Mediterranean Sea between mid-September and mid-October 1929, arriving in Barcelona in mid-October 1929 for a crew rest period. After stopping at Lisbon, Portugal, to refuel, B-2, B-3, B-4, and B-5 arrived at Vigo on the morning of 7 November 1929.

In 1930, the submarine division at Ferrol consisted of B-1, B-2, B-3, and B-4. The four submarines began repairs at the Ferrol dockyard on 25 April 1930. On 5 June 1930, the four submarines got underway from Ferrol to begin a cruise along the northern coast of Spain, during which they visited several ports. They took part in maneuvers in the Cantabrian Sea off the northern coast of Spain in September and October 1930.

=== Second Spanish Republic, 1931–1936 ===
On 14 April 1931, the Second Spanish Republic was proclaimed, replacing the Kingdom of Spain. The Spanish Navy came under the republic's control as the Spanish Republican Navy.

B-4 departed Ferrol in company with B-2 bound for Bilbao, which the two submarines reached on 7 May 1931. On 9 May, they departed Bilbao and set course for Pasajes. Both submarines got underway from Santander on the morning of 12 May 1931 to conduct maneuvers, and after completing them returned to Santander that afternoon. B-1, B-2, B-4 and the torpedo boats No. 2, No. 7, No. 9, and No. 10 departed Ferrol on 3 August 1931 for a cruise along the northern coast of Spain, where they made various port calls. The cruise included a stop at San Sebastián and then a visit to the Galician estuaries at the end of August 1931. B-2, B-3, B-4, and the torpedo boats No. 9 and No. 10 departed Ferrol on 10 September 1931 for another training cruise along Spain's northern coast, reaching Bilbao on 15 September.

An order of the Ministry of the Navy of 15 August 1934 mandated that the crew size of all six B-class submarines increase from 28 to 34 men. On 16 April 1935, B-1, B-2, B-3, and B-4 were reassigned from the naval base at A Graña to the naval station at Mahón on Menorca in the Balearic Islands. B-4 was in the floating dry dock at Mahón for repairs from 22 to 24 April 1936. In early July 1936, B-2, B-3, B-4, and the water tanker A-3 conducted a cruise around the Balearic Islands.

=== Spanish Civil War, 1936–1939 ===
On 17 July 1936, the Spanish Civil War began, with Nationalist forces under Francisco Franco opposing Republican forces which remained loyal to the Second Spanish Republic. At the time, B-2, B-3, and B-4 were at Sóller on Mallorca in the Balearic Islands. The three submarines anchored at Pollensa on the northern coast of Mallorca on the afternoon of 18 July, and on the night of 19 July B-3 and B-4 arrived at Palma de Mallorca on Mallorca. The two submarines as well as B-2 and the water tanker A-3 reached Mahón on the morning of 20 July 1936. On 21 July, naval crews mutinied in the port and arrested many of their officers on the suspicion that they harbored Nationalist sympathies. B-4′s commanding officer and executive officer were arrested, and they were among a number of officers murdered at the Mola Fortress on 3 August 1936.

Meanwhile, a boatswain took command of B-4, and she joined B-2 and B-3 in patrolling the waters around Republican-held Menorca until the end of July 1936 to intercept any Nationalist attempt to invade the island from neighboring Mallorca. B-3 and B-4 took part in a Republican amphibious landing on the island of Cabrera on 1 August 1936. Unable to risk submerging because of her poor material condition and the inexperience of her crew after the arrest of her officers, she operated as a surface ship between 16 August and 4 September 1936 while she took part in an unsuccessful Republican attempt to make an amphibious landing at Porto Cristo on the eastern coast of Nationalist-held Mallorca. B-3 and B-4 subsequently continued their patrols in the Balearic Islands.

Unable to maintain and operate B-4, the Republicans eventually moored her at Portmán for the rest of the war, which ended on 1 April 1939 in a Nationalist victory and the establishment of Francoist Spain. One source claims that Republican forces scuttled her at Portmán in April 1939.

=== Francoist Spain ===
After the civil war, the victorious Nationalists took possession of B-4, which they found in very poor condition at Portmán; the source that claims she had been scuttled there also states that the Nationalists salvaged her. They towed her to Cartagena for scrapping and officially decommissioned her on 31 July 1941.
