= Spanish submarine Isaac Peral =

Four submarines of the Spanish Navy have borne the name Isaac Peral, after the Spanish naval officer and submarine pioneer Isaac Peral (1851–1895).

- Isaac Peral (A-0), an American-made submarine in commission from 1917 to 1932
- Isaac Peral (C-1), a C-class submarine in commission from 1928 to 1948
- Isaac Peral (S-32), formerly USS Ronquil, a Balao-class submarine updated to Guppy IIA configuration in commission from 1971 to 1987
- Isaac Peral (S-81), an S-80 Plus-class submarine commissioned in 2023

== See also ==
- Spanish submarine Peral, an experimental submarine in commission from 1888 to 1890
