= Spanish submarine Narcíso Monturiol (A-1) =

Spanish Navy submarine of 1917–1934

History

Spain
- Name: Narcíso Monturiol
- Namesake: Narcís Monturiol (1819–1885), Spanish submarine pioneer
- Builder: FIAT-San Giorgio, La Spezia, Italy
- Laid down: 28 September 1915
- Launched: 16 April 1917
- Commissioned: 25 August 1917
- Stricken: 1 January 1934
- Identification: Pennant number A-1
- Fate: Disarmed March 1935

General characteristics
- Class & type: A-class submarine
- Displacement: 262 long tons (266 t) (surfaced); 319 long tons (324 t) (submerged)
- Length: 45.6 m (149 ft 7 in) (overall); 45.1 m (148 ft 0 in) (between perpendiculars)
- Beam: 4.2 m (13 ft 9 in)
- Draught: 3.1 m (10 ft 2 in)
- Propulsion: 2 × 670 bhp (500 kW) Fiat diesel engines; 2 × 500 hp (373 kW) Savigliano electric motors; 2 x shafts; 15 tons diesel fuel
- Speed: 12.5 knots (23.2 km/h; 14.4 mph) (surfaced); 8.2 knots (15.2 km/h; 9.4 mph) (submerged)
- Range: 1,600 nmi (3,000 km; 1,800 mi) at 8.5 knots (15.7 km/h; 9.8 mph) (surfaced); 80 nmi (150 km; 92 mi) at 4 knots (7.4 km/h; 4.6 mph) (submerged)
- Test depth: 45 metres (148 feet)
- Complement: 26 (2 officers, 24 men)
- Armament: 2 × 450 mm (17.7 in) torpedo tubes (2 bow); 4 x torpedoes; 1 × 76 mm (3 in) deck gun
- Notes: SOURCE:

Narcíso Monturiol (A-1) was a Spanish Navy A-class submarine commissioned in 1917. She was one of three Italian F-class submarines constructed in Italy for the Spanish Navy. One of the first four operational submarines the Spanish Navy acquired, she served for most of her service life under the Kingdom of Spain, then was a unit of the Spanish Republican Navy under the Second Spanish Republic. She was stricken from the navy list in 1934.

The Spanish Navy named Narcíso Monturiol in honor of Narcís Monturiol (1819–1885), a Spanish lawyer, artist, journalist, newspaper publisher, and engineer. He followed up his invention of a hand-powered submarine, Ictíneo I, with the invention of a second submarine, Ictíneo II. Ictíneo II had a steam engine, becoming the first submarine driven by a combustion engine, and an air-independent propulsion system, making her the first submarine with such a system.

== Construction and commissioning ==
In 1915, the Spanish Cortes Generales passed the Miranda Law, a naval construction program which called for a Spanish Navy force that included 28 submarines. It authorized the construction of the navy's first four operational submarines, which also were the navy's first submarines since the 19th century, as well as a submarine rescue ship. The Ministry of the Navy contracted with the Fore River Shipyard in the United States to build one of the new submarines, which became Isaac Peral (A-0). For the other three, it turned to Italy, purchasing three Italian F-class submarines from the FIAT-San Giorgio shipyard in La Spezia. The three Italian-built vessels became the Spanish Navy's A-class submarines.

Narcíso Monturiol (A-1) was laid down at La Spezia on 28 September 1915 with the Italian designation F22. Her prospective commanding officer, Capitán de corbeta (Corvette Captain) Mateo García de los Reyes — a future contralmirante (counter admiral) and minister of the navy — traveled to La Spezia with part of the crew in July 1916 for submarine training. The submarine was launched on 16 April 1917, with the Spanish ambassador to Italy in attendance. The shipyard delivered Narcíso Monturiol and her sister ships Cosme García (A-2) and A-3 at La Spezia on 25 August 1917 and the Spanish Navy commissioned all three submarines the same day. Narcíso Monturiol′s pennant number was A–1 and García de los Reyes took command as her first commanding officer. He also was appointed head of the Spanish Navy's Submarine Division that day.

== Service history ==
=== 1917–1921 ===
After their commissioning, the three A-class submarines made a cruise along the Italian coast from La Spezia to Genoa under García de los Reyes's command to test their equipment and conduct diving tests. After a few days at Genoa, where they completed fitting out, they got underway on 2 September 1917 for their delivery voyage to Spain. The protected cruiser Extremadura — which served as the Spanish Navy's submarine tender from 1917 until the submarine rescue ship Kanguro arrived in Spain and took over the role in December 1920 — escorted the flotilla on its voyage. The three submarines and Extremadura arrived in Spain at Tarragona on 4 September 1917. They departed Tarragona on 8 September 1917 and proceeded to the submarine base at the Cartagena Naval Base in Cartagena. All four Spanish Navy submarines — the three A-class submarines and Isaac Peral — then made a cruise along the Spanish coast, visiting various ports to display themselves and their capabilities to the Spanish public with Narcíso Monturiol serving as García de los Reyes's flagship.

On the night of 18 January 1919 the three A-class submarines arrived at Barcelona in company with the battleship Alfonso XIII and the torpedo boat No. 18 after a voyage from Cartagena. While moored alongside Alfonso XIII during this visit to Barcelona, Narciso Monturiol, still serving as García de los Reyes's flagship, received her battle flag, donated by the city council of Barcelona. During the summer of 1919 all four Spanish submarines undertook their first extended cruise, accompanied by Extremadura. During this cruise, they conducted exercises off Chipiona, then called at Sanlúcar de Barrameda, Vigo, Ferrol, and Gijón before arriving at Santander on 18 August 1919. While they were at Santander, King Alfonso XIII boarded Narciso Monturiol on 22 August and the submarines put to sea under escort by the destroyers Bustamente and Proserpina to conduct maneuvers off Cabo Mayor. Narciso Monturiol submerged during the day's maneuvers, touching bottom at a depth of 24 metres (79 feet) and making Alfonso XIII the first Spanish monarch to submerge aboard a submarine. The submarines and Extremadure arrived at San Sebastián under escort by the gunboat Marqués de la Victoria on the afternoon of 25 August for an overnight stop. They got back underway on 26 August and proceeded to Pasajes, where they conducted maneuvers. They subsequently visited Bilbao and Gijón on the northern coast of Spain and Lisbon in Portugal. They returned to Cartagena in September 1919 except for A-3, which remained in Vigo until December 1919. García de los Reyes relinquished command of Narciso Monturiol on 23 or 24 October 1919, according to different sources, but remained the commander of the submarine division, as well as of the Submarine School at Cartagena.

Under the command of García de los Reyes, now a capitán de fragata (frigate captain), the submarine flotilla and its escorts — the destroyer Audaz and the torpedo boats No. 1 and No. 4 — made a training voyage in the Mediterranean Sea in June 1920. The vessels arrived at Mahón on Menorca in the Balearic Islands on 5 June. They stopped at Alicante, then reached Almería on 14 June. They got back underway on the morning of 18 June and headed for the coast of North Africa, where they visited Melilla and Ceuta before arriving at Cartagena. A royal order of 21 December 1920 reorganized the Spanish submarine force, creating a submarine training division consisting of Isaac Peral, the three A-class submarines, Kanguro, and two torpedo boats.

In 1921, the submarine flotilla undertook a training voyage to the Canary Islands in which it departed Cartagena on 21 April, called at Cádiz, and then set course for Lanzarote. They visited several ports in the Canaries, then stopped at Cádiz and Ceuta before returning to Cartagena on 6 June 1921.

In September 1921, the submarine training division conducted a training cruise in the Mediterranean Sea under García de los Reyes's overall command. After departing Cartagena, the three A-class submarines, Isaac Peral, Kanguro, and the torpedo boats No. 1, No. 3, No. 21, and No. 22 visited Alicante and Gandía before calling at Valencia from 8 to 9 September. They then made a stop at Vinaròs before proceeding to Barcelona.

The Barcelona visit lasted a week, and took place to allow Minister of the Navy José Gómez Acedo and the chief of the naval staff, Vicealmirante (Vice Admiral) Salvador Buhigas, to review the Spanish Navy's submarine and torpedo boat flotillas and demonstrate for them the navy's newest acquisitions. Kanguro arrived at Barcelona on the afternoon of 12 September 1921, followed by Isaac Peral, Narciso Monturiol, Cosme García, and A-3 and then by the torpedo boats No. 1, No. 5, No. 21, and No. 22. There to meet them were the troopship Almirante Lobo — which had arrived at Barcelona on the afternoon of 11 September 1921 carrying two seaplanes of the Spanish Naval Air Arm — as well as Audaz and the protected cruiser Río de la Plata. What followed were the Spanish Navy's first sea-and-air exercises.

Amidst a thick fog that later dissipated, the two flotillas got underway at 09:30 on 13 September 1921 to begin maneuvers. With crowds looking on from shore and aboard private boats, Kanguro and the torpedo boats left port first, followed later by Almirante Lobo and the submarines. Two seaplanes also took off, and a tethered balloon was launched. Kanguro stood by while the submarines carried out various activities during the day.

On the morning of 19 September, Kanguro weighed anchor and led the squadron out of the harbor, followed by the submarines and then the torpedo boats. Almirante Lobo and Audaz accompanied them. With Gómez Acedo and Buhigas embarked on Narciso Monturiol, the vessels conducted diving maneuvers and antisubmarine warfare exercises with naval aircraft. The activities concluded later in the morning, and Gómez Acedo and Buhigas transferred from Narciso Monturiol to Audaz and then to Río de la Plata. Meanwhile, the submarine training division and its escorts resumed their training cruise later in the day, next visiting Mahón before calling at Valencia again and then returning to Cartagena.

The submarine flotilla completed a voyage from Cartagena to Almería on 25 October 1921. It returned to Cartagena on 26 October.

=== 1922–1935 ===
By August 1922, the Spanish Navy's submarine flotilla consisted of the three A-class submarines, Isaac Peral, and the new B-class submarines B-1, B-2, and B-3. All seven submarines departed Cartagena on 26 August 1922 and made a stop at Ceuta. Leaving A-3 behind to undergo repairs and rejoin them later, the other submarines got back underway on 28 August bound for San Sebastián, where in September 1922 the submarine flotilla took part in commemorative events marking the 400th anniversary of the completion of the first circumnavigation of the world, begun in 1519 by the Portuguese explorer Ferdinand Magellan and completed after Magellan's death by the Spanish navigator, shipowner, and explorer Juan Sebastián Elcano in 1522. The Spanish royal family visited the submarine flotilla when it called at Pasajes. After the royal visit, the submarine flotilla conducted exercises and made port calls at Ferrol, Marín, and Vigo. The submarines later returned to Cartagena.

With King Alfonso XIII observing from aboard the destroyer Villaamil, the submarine flotilla conducted maneuvers in the Mediterranean Sea off Cartagena in March 1923. Later in 1923, the Spanish Navy reorganized its submarine force, creating a submarine division based at Mahón made up of Narcíso Monturiol and Cosme García and a training division based at Cartagena consisting of Isaac Peral, A-3, B-1, B-2, B-3, and the submarine B-4. In October 1923, Narcíso Monturiol, Cosme García, and the torpedo boat No. 6 conducted training exercises off Mahón. The two submarines arrived in Barcelona on 12 October 1923 in company with No. 6 to undergo repairs. With them complete, the two submarines and No. 6 put back to sea on 28 November 1923 bound for Mahón.

Narcíso Monturiol and Cosme García completed a refit at Barcelona on 3 February 1925, departing soon thereafter to return to their base at Mahón. Both submarines had their hulls cleaned at Barcelona in July 1925 and again returned to their base at Mahón, accompanied by the torpedo boat No. 6. They both underwent repairs in dry dock at Barcelona in December 1925. In 1928, A-3 replaced Cosme García in the submarine division at Mahón.

In August 1929, the Spanish Navy established a submarine squadron at the Mahón naval base consisting of Isaac Peral, Narcíso Monturiol, Cosme García, and A-3. The submarines arrived at Mahón on 6 August 1929. The torpedo boat No. 6 accompanied them, as did the troopship Almirante Lobo, which brought the crews' families to Mahón. The squadron held its annual maneuvers in the Mediterranean Sea between mid-September and mid-October 1929. In early March 1930, the Spanish Navy disbanded the Mahón submarine squadron, and the submarines returned to Cartagena.

On 14 April 1931, the Second Spanish Republic was proclaimed, replacing the Kingdom of Spain. The Spanish Navy came under the republic's control as the Spanish Republican Navy.

== Disposal ==
Narcíso Monturiol was stricken from the navy list on 1 January 1934. She was disarmed in March 1935 in preparation for scrapping.
