= Spanish submarine A-3 =

Spanish Navy submarine of 1917–1932

History

Spain
- Name: A-3
- Builder: FIAT-San Giorgio, La Spezia, Italy
- Laid down: 23 March 1916
- Launched: 16 June 1917
- Commissioned: 25 August 1917
- Decommissioned: 18 May 1932
- Identification: Pennant number A-3
- Fate: Scrapped

General characteristics
- Class & type: A-class submarine
- Displacement: 262 long tons (266 t) (surfaced); 319 long tons (324 t) (submerged)
- Length: 45.6 m (149 ft 7 in) (overall); 45.1 m (148 ft 0 in) (between perpendiculars)
- Beam: 4.2 m (13 ft 9 in)
- Draught: 3.1 m (10 ft 2 in)
- Propulsion: 2 × 670 bhp (500 kW) Fiat diesel engines; 2 × 500 hp (373 kW) Savigliano electric motors; 2 x shafts; 15 tons diesel fuel
- Speed: 12.5 knots (23.2 km/h; 14.4 mph) (surfaced); 8.2 knots (15.2 km/h; 9.4 mph) (submerged)
- Range: 1,600 nmi (3,000 km; 1,800 mi) at 8.5 knots (15.7 km/h; 9.8 mph) (surfaced); 80 nmi (150 km; 92 mi) at 4 knots (7.4 km/h; 4.6 mph) (submerged)
- Test depth: 45 metres (148 feet)
- Complement: 26 (2 officers, 24 men)
- Armament: 2 × 450 mm (17.7 in) torpedo tubes (2 bow); 4 x torpedoes; 1 × 76 mm (3 in) deck gun
- Notes: SOURCE:

A-3 was a Spanish Navy A-class submarine in commission from 1917 to 1932. She was one of three Italian F-class submarines constructed in Italy for the Spanish Navy. One of the first four operational submarines the Spanish Navy acquired, she served for most of her history under the Kingdom of Spain, participating in the Rif War in 1922. Late in her service life, she was a unit of the Spanish Republican Navy under the Second Spanish Republic. She was the only A-class submarine that did not receive a name.

== Construction and commissioning ==
In 1915, the Spanish Cortes Generales passed the Miranda Law, a naval construction program which called for a Spanish Navy force that included 28 submarines. It authorized the construction of the navy's first four operational submarines, which also were the navy's first submarines since the 19th century, as well as a submarine rescue ship. The Ministry of the Navy contracted with the Fore River Shipyard in the United States to build one of the new submarines, which became Isaac Peral (A-0). For the other three, it turned to Italy, purchasing three Italian F-class submarines from the FIAT-San Giorgio shipyard in La Spezia. The three Italian-built vessels became the Spanish Navy's A-class submarines.

A-3 was laid down at La Spezia on 23 March 1916 with the Italian designation F24. She was launched on 16 June 1917. The shipyard delivered A-3 and her sister ships Narcíso Monturiol (A-1) and Cosme García (A-2) at La Spezia on 25 August 1917 and the Spanish Navy commissioned all three submarines the same day.

== Service history ==
=== 1917–1921 ===
After their commissioning, the three A-class submarines made a cruise along the Italian coast from La Spezia to Genoa under the overall command of Narcíso Monturiol′s commanding officer — Capitán de corbeta (Corvette Captain) Mateo García de los Reyes, a future contralmirante (counter admiral) and minister of the navy — who had taken command of the Spanish Navy's Submarine Division on 25 August 1917. They tested their equipment and conducted diving tests during the voyage. After a few days at Genoa, where they completed fitting out, they got underway on 2 September 1917 for their delivery voyage to Spain. The protected cruiser Extremadura — which served as the Spanish Navy's submarine tender from 1917 until the submarine rescue ship Kanguro arrived in Spain and took over the role in December 1920 — escorted the flotilla on its voyage. The three submarines and Extremadura arrived in Spain at Tarragona on 4 September 1917. They departed Tarragona on 8 September 1917 and proceeded to the submarine base at the Cartagena Naval Base in Cartagena. All four Spanish Navy submarines — the three A-class submarines and Isaac Peral — then made a cruise along the Spanish coast, visiting various ports to display themselves and their capabilities to the Spanish public.

On the night of 18 January 1919 the three A-class submarines arrived at Barcelona in company with the battleship Alfonso XIII and the torpedo boat No. 18 after a voyage from Cartagena. During the summer of 1919 all four Spanish submarines undertook their first extended cruise, accompanied by Extremadura. During this cruise, they conducted exercises off Chipiona, then called at Sanlúcar de Barrameda, Vigo, Ferrol, and Gijón before arriving at Santander on 18 August 1919. While at Santander, they put to sea under escort by the destroyers Bustamante and Proserpina on 22 August and conducted maneuvers off Cabo Mayor during the day with King Alfonso XIII aboard Narciso Monturiol. The submarines and Extremadure arrived at San Sebastián under escort by the gunboat Marqués de la Victoria on the afternoon of 25 August for an overnight stop. They got back underway on 26 August and proceeded to Pasajes, where they conducted maneuvers. They subsequently visited Bilbao and Gijón on the northern coast of Spain and Lisbon in Portugal. The rest of the vessels returned to Cartagena in September 1919, but A-3 suffered mechanical problems which forced her to remain at Vigo for repairs until December 1919.

Under the command of García de los Reyes, now a capitán de fragata (frigate captain), the submarine flotilla and its escorts — the destroyer Audaz and the torpedo boats No. 1 and No. 4 — made a training voyage in the Mediterranean Sea in June 1920. The vessels arrived at Mahón on Menorca in the Balearic Islands on 5 June. They stopped at Alicante, then reached Almería on 14 June. They got back underway on the morning of 18 June and headed for the coast of North Africa, where they visited Melilla and Ceuta before arriving at Cartagena. A royal order of 21 December 1920 reorganized the Spanish submarine force, creating a submarine training division consisting of Isaac Peral, the three A-class submarines, Kanguro, and two torpedo boats.

In 1921, the submarine flotilla undertook a training voyage to the Canary Islands in which it departed Cartagena on 21 April, called at Cádiz, and then set course for Lanzarote. They visited several ports in the Canaries, then stopped at Cádiz and Ceuta before returning to Cartagena on 6 June 1921.

In September 1921, the submarine training division conducted a training cruise in the Mediterranean Sea under García de los Reyes's overall command. After departing Cartagena, the three A-class submarines, Isaac Peral, Kanguro, and the torpedo boats No. 1, No. 3, No. 21, and No. 22 visited Alicante and Gandía before calling at Valencia from 8 to 9 September. They then made a stop at Vinaròs before proceeding to Barcelona.

The Barcelona visit lasted a week, and took place to allow Minister of the Navy José Gómez Acedo and the chief of the naval staff, Vicealmirante (Vice Admiral) Salvador Buhigas, to review the Spanish Navy's submarine and torpedo boat flotillas and demonstrate for them the navy's newest acquisitions. Kanguro arrived at Barcelona on the afternoon of 12 September 1921, followed by Isaac Peral, Narciso Monturiol, Cosme García, and A-3 and then by the torpedo boats No. 1, No. 5, No. 21, and No. 22. There to meet them were the troopship Almirante Lobo — which had arrived at Barcelona on the afternoon of 11 September 1921 carrying two seaplanes of the Spanish Naval Air Arm — as well as Audaz and the protected cruiser Río de la Plata. What followed were the Spanish Navy's first sea-and-air exercises.

Amidst a thick fog that later dissipated, the two flotillas got underway at 09:30 on 13 September 1921 to begin maneuvers. With crowds looking on from shore and aboard private boats, Kanguro and the torpedo boats left port first, followed later by Almirante Lobo and the submarines. Two seaplanes also took off, and a tethered balloon was launched. Kanguro stood by while the submarines carried out various activities during the day. At her anchorage in Barcelona on 14 September, Kanguro, a large catamaran capable of operating as a submarine rescue ship, salvage ship, and submarine tender, conducted a test of her lifting equipment, designed to lift a stricken submarine up to 46 metres (151 ft) in length and displacing up to 650 tons from a depth of 40 metres (131 ft) to a height of six metres (20 ft) above sea level within a central tunnel formed by Kanguro′s twin hulls. For the test, A-3 positioned herself under Kanguro and Kanguro lifted her out of the water. Kanguro′s crew inspected A-3′s hull, then Kanguro lowered A-3 back into the water.

On the morning of 19 September, Kanguro weighed anchor and led the squadron out of the harbor, followed by the submarines and then the torpedo boats. Almirante Lobo and Audaz accompanied them. With Gómez Acedo and Buhigas embarked on Narciso Monturiol, the vessels conducted diving maneuvers and antisubmarine warfare exercises with naval aircraft. The activities concluded later in the morning, and Gómez Acedo and Buhigas transferred from Narciso Monturiol to Audaz and then to Río de la Plata. Meanwhile, the submarine training division and its escorts resumed their training cruise later in the day, next visiting Mahón before calling at Valencia again and then returning to Cartagena.

The submarine flotilla completed a voyage from Cartagena to Almería on 25 October 1921. It returned to Cartagena on 26 October.

=== 1922–1935 ===
The Rif War, which pitted Spanish forces against Berber tribes in the Rif region of Spanish Morocco in North Africa, had broken out in 1921. A-3, Isaac Peral, and the submarine B-1 departed Cartagena to head for the war zone on 2 June 1922 escorted by the torpedo boat No. 22. They called at Málaga from 3 to 5 June, then headed for Peñón de Alhucemas, an islet in the Alhucemas Islands which was under siege by Riffian forces and in urgent need of fresh water. While A-3 operated in a reconnaissance and support role, Isaac Peral and B-1 approached Peñón de Alhucemas during the night of 5–6 June, but the Riffians sighted them and opened fire on them from five different points along the coast. This prompted the submarines to withdraw to Melilla before returning to Cartagena on 7 June 1922.

A-3, Isaac Peral, B-1, and the submarine B-2 got underway from Cartagena on 20 June 1922 to begin another attempt to resupply the Alhucemas Islands. They called at Málaga before getting back underway on 23 June and arriving at the islands that night. The submarines resupplied Peñón de Alhucemas during the night of 23–24 June. They withdrew before dawn and headed for Melilla. They arrived at Cartagena on 25 June 1922.

By August 1922, the Spanish Navy's submarine flotilla consisted of the three A-class submarines, Isaac Peral, and the new B-class submarines B-1, B-2, and B-3. All seven submarines departed Cartagena on 26 August 1922 and made a stop at Ceuta. Leaving A-3 behind to undergo repairs and rejoin them later, the other submarines got back underway on 28 August bound for San Sebastián, where in September 1922 the submarine flotilla took part in commemorative events marking the 400th anniversary of the completion of the first circumnavigation of the world, begun in 1519 by the Portuguese explorer Ferdinand Magellan and completed after Magellan's death by the Spanish navigator, shipowner, and explorer Juan Sebastián Elcano in 1522. The Spanish royal family visited the submarine flotilla when it called at Pasajes. After the royal visit, the submarine flotilla conducted exercises and made port calls at Ferrol, Marín, and Vigo. On 25 September 1922, A-3, Cosme García, Isaac Peral, B-1, B-2, B-3, and the tug Cíclope arrived at Cádiz. The same vessels departed Cádiz on 4 October 1922 in company with Kanguro and proceeded to Cartagena.

With King Alfonso XIII observing from aboard the destroyer Villaamil, the submarine flotilla conducted maneuvers in the Mediterranean Sea off Cartagena in March 1923. Later in 1923, the Spanish Navy reorganized its submarine force, creating a submarine division based at Mahón made up of Cosme García and Narcíso Monturiol and a training division based at Cartagena consisting of A-3, Isaac Peral, B-1, B-2, B-3, and the submarine B-4. In 1926, training division in Cartagena was made up of A-3, B-2, B-3, B-4, Kanguro, and the submarines B-5 and B-6. In 1928, A-3 replaced Cosme García in the submarine division at Mahón and Cosme García became part of the Cartagena division.

In August 1929, the Spanish Navy established a submarine squadron at the Mahón naval base consisting of A-3, Isaac Peral, Narcíso Monturiol, and Cosme García. The submarines arrived at Mahón on 6 August 1929. The torpedo boat No. 6 accompanied them, as did the troopship Almirante Lobo, which brought the crews' families to Mahón. The squadron held its annual maneuvers in the Mediterranean Sea between mid-September and mid-October 1929. In early March 1930, the Spanish Navy disbanded the Mahón submarine squadron, and the submarines returned to Cartagena.

On 14 April 1931, the Second Spanish Republic was proclaimed, replacing the Kingdom of Spain. The Spanish Navy came under the republic's control as the Spanish Republican Navy.

== Disposal ==
A-3 was decommissioned on 18 May 1932. She subsequently was scrapped.
