= Spanish submarine rescue ship Kanguro =

Spanish Navy submarine rescue ship of 1921–1943

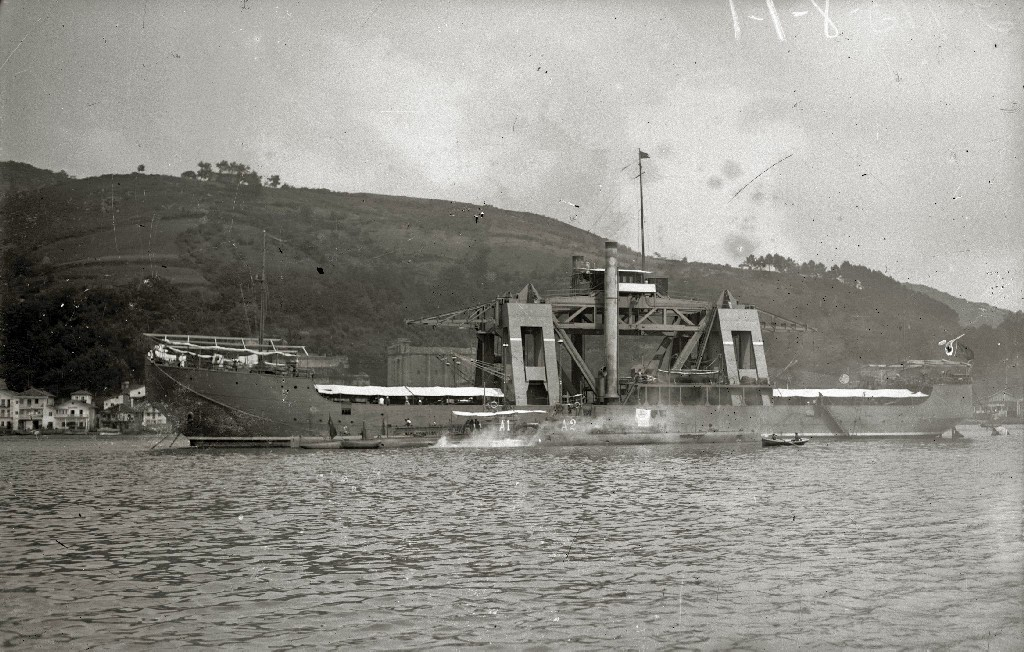
- Kanguro with the submarines Narciso Monturiol (A-1) and Cosme García (A-2) alongside in Pasajes Bay in 1922.

History

Spain
- Name: Kanguro
- Namesake: Kangaroo (variant spelling of "canguro")
- Ordered: 1915
- Builder: Werf Conrad, Haarlem, Netherlands
- Yard number: 486
- Laid down: 1915
- Launched: 28 July 1916
- Completed: July 1917
- Commissioned: 26 January 1921
- Out of service: 1 May 1939 (in reserve)
- Decommissioned: 20 October 1939
- Recommissioned: 1 February 1940
- Decommissioned: 23 November 1943
- Fate: Scrapped 1946

General characteristics
- Type: Submarine rescue ship
- Displacement: 2,480 t (2,441 long tons)
- Length: 84 m (275 ft 7 in)
- Beam: 20 m (65 ft 7 in)
- Draft: 3.57 m (11 ft 9 in)
- Depth: 6 m (19 ft 8 in)
- Propulsion: 2 × 600 hp (447 kW) diesel engines; 2 × four-bladed screws
- Speed: 9.53 knots (17.65 km/h; 10.97 mph) (maximum); 7.2 knots (13.3 km/h; 8.3 mph) {economical cruising)
- Range: 1,266 nmi (2,300 km; 1,500 mi) at maximum speed; 2,448 nmi (4,534 km; 2,817 mi) at economical speed
- Complement: 97
- Armament: none

Kanguro was a Spanish Navy submarine rescue ship in commission from 1921 to 1939 and from 1940 to 1943. Although she never had an opportunity to recover a stricken submarine, she performed the roles of a submarine tender, a floating drydock, and a salvage ship during her time in commission. She served under the Kingdom of Spain until 1931, then under the Second Spanish Republic. Under repair when the Spanish Civil War broke out in 1936, she remained under the control of the Republican faction during the war, but did not operate during the conflict. After the Nationalist faction won the war in 1939, she was incorporated into the naval forces of Francoist Spain. She was scrapped in 1946.

== Design ==
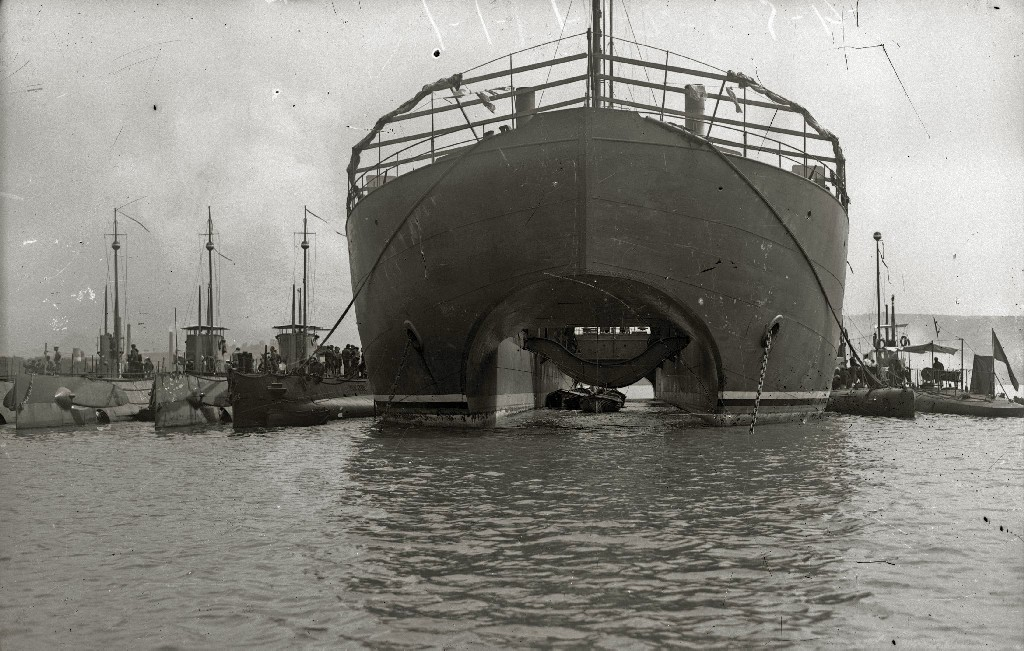
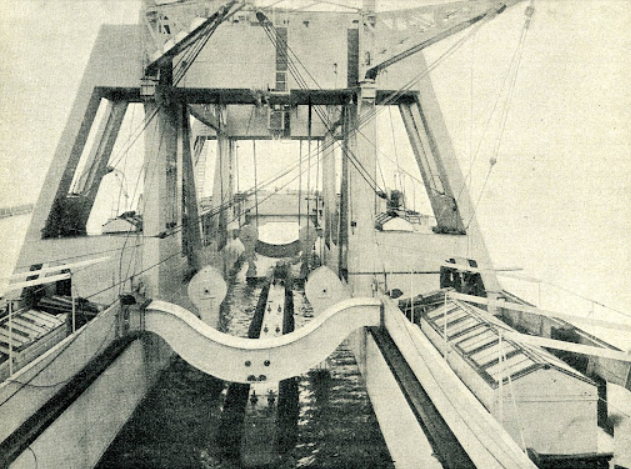
TOP: A bow view of Kanguro in port at Pasajes, Spain, in 1922, with A-class submarines moored on her port side (at right) and B-class submarines moored on her starboard side (at left). Her catamaran design is clearly visible; it created a tunnel between her twin hulls into which her crew could lift submarines for resupply and repairs. ABOVE: A view of Kanguro′s deck and well published in 1921. It shows her complicated lifting mechanism and crane system.

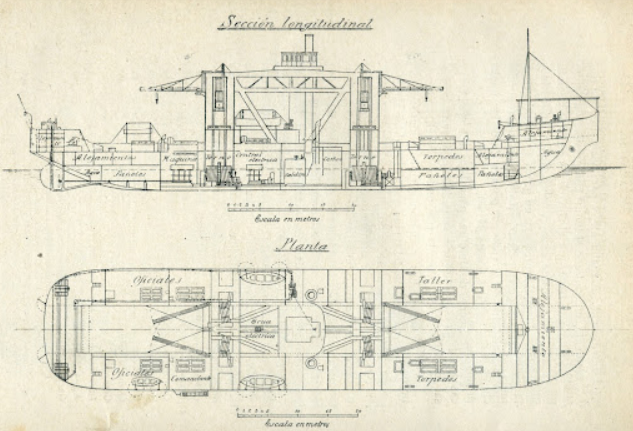
Line drawings of Kanguro published in 1921.

Kanguro was a large catamaran — the first catamaran to serve in the Spanish Navy — with twin hulls. Her builders designed Kanguro′s two hulls by splitting a standard hull form measuring 75 metres (246 ft 1 in) in length and 12 metres (39 ft 4 in) in beam and dividing it in half along its longitudinal centerline. A heavy structural framework joined the two halves, forming a forecastle at the bow and a quarterdeck at the stern and creating an eight-metre-wide (26-foot) central tunnel between the hulls. Despite her size and her unconventional design, she reportedly was very manageable, handled very well, and displayed good seaworthiness even in rough seas.

A central gantry crane spanned Kanguro′s tunnel. It had a system of four horizontal lifting mechanisms, each with a large block-and-tackle system with eight flexible 50 mm (2-inch) cables. Each lifting mechanism was powered by its own electric motor, and each could lift approximately 165 tons. This allowed Kanguro to lift submarines up to 46 metres (151 ft) in length and displacing up to 650 tons from a depth of at least 40 metres (131 ft) to a height of six metres (20 ft) above sea level within the central tunnel. The lifting mechanism then could lower the submarine onto two keel blocks in the tunnel, creating in effect a floating drydock in which the submarine could receive supplies and undergo simple repairs. A submarine also could enter or exit the tunnel while partially submerged, if not while fully surfaced.

The structural framework joining the two hulls created a spacious platform which accommodated Kanguro′s bridge and a large central control room from which Kanguro′s crane operators could control the four crane motors remotely. The operators could operate each motor separately, allowing the operators to center the weight being raised and even tilt the submarine being lifted longitudinallyif that was necessary to rescue personnel from it. Two windows allowed the operators to view the cranes' cables while they were in operation. Each block-and-tackle system automatically compensated for differences in elongation between the cables so that the load would be distributed equally among them. Kanguro also had an underwater automatic hook-up system built into the bottom of the 7.5-ton lower pulley blocks designed to automatically latch onto a sunken submarine underwater without requiring divers to manually connect cables. This system did not prove to be useful, however, because it only worked if the submarine was constructed with bulky, heavy custom fitting points on her outer hull and if she was sitting upright on the seabed — a very unusual rescue scenario. Kanguro carried a geometric test block which could be filled with water until it weighed up to 700 tons; it allowed Kanguro′s crane operators to practice lifting operations without risking damage to an actual submarine.

To support a submarine once it had been lifted from the water, Kanguro had two 20-ton movable keel blocks. The ship's four steam winches could move the keel blocks using steel cables. To allow a submarine to enter or exit through the central tunnel's forward entrance, the bow keel block could be hoisted out of the way using a pair of davits. However, vertical clearance at the forward entrance was limited even after the block was lifted as high as possible, requiring even a small submarine with its periscopes lowered to enter and exit the tunnel's forward entrance while semi-submerged.

In addition to the main heavy-lift crane system, Kanguro′s central tunnel had a separate system of cargo-handling cranes. This consisted of four overhead cargo cranes — each powered by its own steam engine, each with a wheeled cargo trolley running along a 9-metre (30 ft) beam, and each capable of lifting five tons — and a single electric overhead monorail crane which could move longitudinally along the length of a submarine in the tunnel and lift heavy components out of her. The electric monorail crane could transfer its load to any of the four horizontal cranes and vice versa.

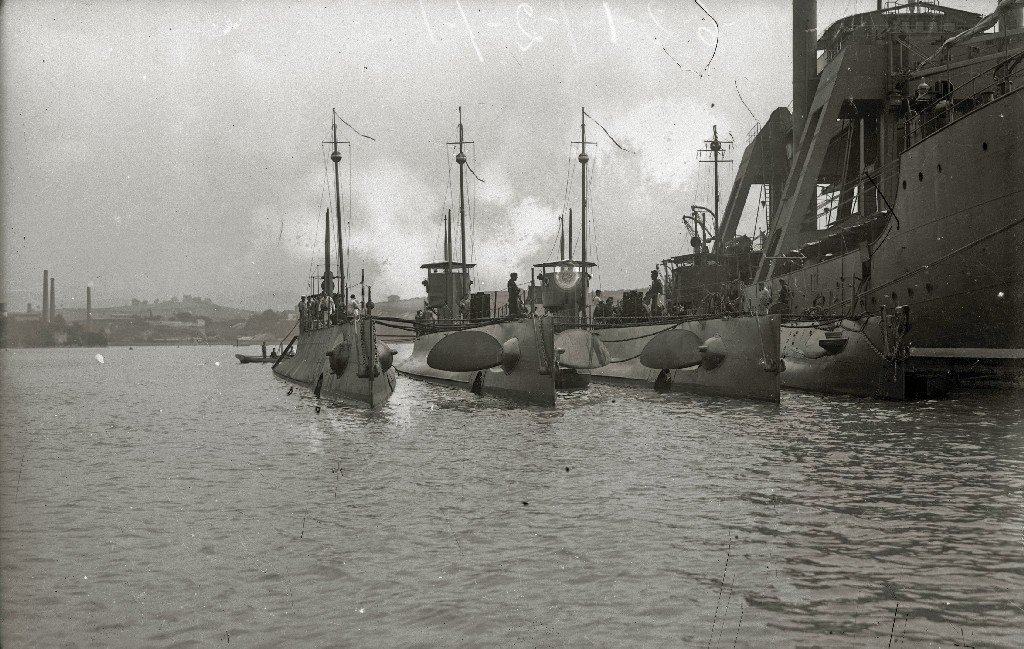
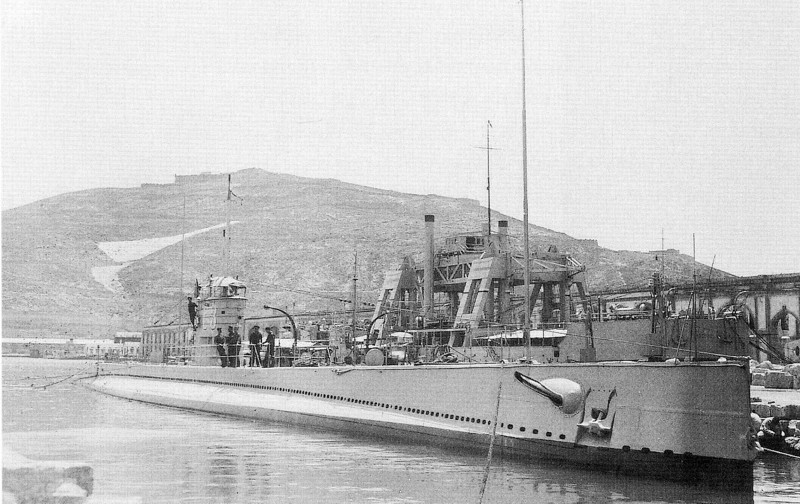
In addition to her role of submarine rescue ship and salvage ship, Kanguro could perform the functions of a submarine tender. TOP: Kanguro with three B-class submarines alongside in Pasajes Bay in 1922.
ABOVE: The submarine C-3 across a pier from Kanguro at Cartagena Naval Base.

Each of Kanguro′s two hulls was identical. The forward section of each hull had storerooms, crew accommodations, a chain locker, and water storage. Each hull had a winch at the forecastle level for the main rigging powered by a 75 hp (56 kW) motor. Aft of the winch, each hull had a boiler room and coal bunker. Aft of that, each hull had, consecutively, a power plant, consisting of a 200-kilowatt, direct-current, 250-volt electric generator; a drum for the corresponding main rigging; and a 600 hp (447 kW) triple-expansion steam engine that drove each hull's propeller. Further aft still were more crew accommodations, storerooms, water storage, and an aft chain locker. The only difference between the two hulls was that the starboard hull had a storage compartment for twelve torpedoes and a warhead magazine, while the corresponding space on the port side housed a workshop equipped with the tools for minor repairs and maintenance of submarines. In the structure joining the two hulls, a habitable space existed both in the quarterdeck section and beneath the forecastle. Kanguro also had accommodation space for submarine crews, compressors, a voltage booster for charging submarine batteries, tanks for naphtha, oil, lubricants, and distilled water for use in batteries, radiotelegraphic and submarine signaling equipment, and diving equipment,among other things, all features that allowed her to function in the role of a submarine tender.

Kanguro was 84 metres (275 ft 7 in) long, with a beam of 20 metres (65 ft 7 in); and a depth of hull of 6 metres (19 ft 8 in). Her draft with all cargo aboard was 3.5 metres (11 ft 6 in); with a submarine aboard it was 3.37 metres (11 ft 1 in). Her two steam engines drove two propellers, giving her a maximum speed of 9.57 knots (17.72 km/h; 11.01 mph) without a submarine aboard and 8.67 knots (16.06 km/h; 9.98 mph) with one aboard. She displaced 2,480 tons. At full speed she had a range of 1,266 nautical miles (2,345 km; 1,457 mi), and at her economical cruising speed her range was 2,448 nautical miles (4,534 km; 2,817 mi). She had a crew of 97.

A significant drawback of Kanguro′s design was that her main and auxiliary services all depended on high-pressure, ordinary-type boilers for their operations rather than on main and auxiliary diesel engines. This meant that when shut down the ship required 10 to 12 hours to power up her systems, unacceptably delaying her response to a submarine accident. Thus, Kanguro′s crew had to keep one of her main boilers pressurized whenever Spanish Navy submarines were conducting training — four days a week from 09:00 to sunset — so that she could get underway quickly in the event of an emergency. This burned a great deal of fuel and led to excessive wear on her boilers and steam engines.

Kanguro's central tunnel was large enough to accommodate the Spanish Navy's first four operational submarines — Isaac Peral (A-0) and the A-class submarines Narciso Monturiol (A-1), Cosme García (A-2), and A-3 — all of which were commissioned in 1917 and the last of which was retired in 1934. Her tunnel was too small to accommodate Spain's later submarines — those of the B class, which were commissioned between 1922 and 1926, and C class, which entered service between 1928 and 1930 — although she nonetheless served them as a submarine tender.

== Construction and commissioning ==
On 17 February 1915, the Spanish Cortes Generales passed the Miranda Law, a naval construction program which called for a Spanish Navy force that included 28 submarines and provided for the acquisition of the Spanish Navy's first four operational submarines. The frequency of submarine accidents in the early 20th century and the resulting loss of life prompted the Spanish Navy to prioritize the acquisition of a submarine rescue ship capable of lifting stricken submarines from the seabed and bringing them to the surface in the event of an accident, and so the Miranda Law also provided for the acquisition of such a vessel.

Werf Conrad, a respected company in the Netherlands which specialized in the construction of dredges and special machinery, came forward on 10 March 1915 with an offer to build a double-hulled salvage ship with the capability to recover submarines of up to 650 tons displacement. The design was known commercially as a "Kanguroo" type, derived from the name of Kanguroo, a ship of similar design constructed in France for the Peruvian Navy. The Spanish Ministry of the Navy asked Werf Conrad for further details on the vessel it proposed, and at the same time invited the Sociedad Española de Construcción Naval (Spanish Naval Construction Society; SECN), an Anglo-Spanish conglomerate, to submit proposals for the construction of the ship. On 20 April 1915 SECN submitted two designs, one from Vickers called Design 653 and another from Armstrong Whitworth known as Design 741. Design 653 could lift a weight of only 450 tons, even though the Spanish requirement was a lifting capacity of 650 to 700 tons. Design 741 was a twin-hulled vessel of the "Kanguroo" type, but otherwise SECN provided little information about either design and no price information, SECN’s British partners preferring that the Spanish Ministry of the Navy first specify the type of salvage vessel it wanted so that SECN could tailor its design to those requirements.

Meanwhile, the Spanish Navy's technical departments reported favorably on Werf Conrad's proposal. In addition, the Spanish Navy found Werf Conrad's offer attractive partly because the Netherlands, like Spain, was neutral during World War I, which had been raging since the summer of 1914. This offered Spain the hope that Dutch neutrality would mean that construction of the ship in the Netherlands would not face the delays due to shortages of materials and competing priorities that it would if a belligerent country like the United Kingdom was involved in her construction. In June 1915 the Ministry of the Navy came to an agreement with Werf Conrad to build the ship at a cost of 79,000 pounds sterling, equivalent to 1,990,800 pesetas at the prevailing exchange rate. The Spanish Navy signed a contract with Werf Conrad on 21 July 1915 which called for the ship to undergo sea trials from a Dutch port within 12 months and then be delivered to the Spanish Navy at a Spanish port.

The ship received the shipyard project number 486, and her keel was laid in 1915 at Werf Conrad's shipyard in Haarlem as soon as the company could gather the necessary materials, a process delayed by wartime shortages despite Dutch neutrality. Construction fell behind schedule, and Werf Conrad did not launch the ship until 28 July 1916. Additional delays followed. When the ship was completed in July 1917, she was moored at Amsterdam, with plans calling for her sea trials to take place in the roadstead of the Nieuwediep, but the war situation on the Dutch coast made it difficult to obtain permission from Dutch authorities to conduct the trials. Permission to conduct them did not arrive until October 1917, after the Spanish Ministry of State interceded. Meanwhile, a severe coal shortage in the Netherlands had prompted the Dutch government in July 1917 — the same month as the ship's completion — to suspend the supply of coal to foreign ships in the Netherlands, so that when Dutch authorities finally granted permission for the acceptance trials it was difficult to procure coal with which to fuel the ship for her trials and eventual delivery voyage to Spain. Spain tried to work around the Dutch coal ban by positioning 600 tons of coal in the Netherlands in neutral ships, but this effort failed, and in the end it proved impossible to conduct the trials during the war, which did not end until November 1918.

After World War I ended, another delay arose when Werf Conrad claimed that under the contract law doctrine of force majeure it could not honor the price of the ship to which the parties had agreed in 1915 because the wartime cost of materials and labor had risen beyond what the firm had anticipated and because the delays in delivering the ship had led to additional expenses in terms of maintenance of the ship, insurance, interest, and so forth. Werf Conrad set the final delivery cost of the ship at about 4,200,000 pesetas, an increase of almost 111 percent over the originally contracted price. At the time, the Spanish Ministry of the Navy's installment payments to the company totaled only 1,200,000 pesetas, and the ministry dismissed Werf Conrad's claims as unrealistically high and in violation of the 1915 contract. On 11 March 1919, the Dutch government again authorized the ship's sea trials, and in May 1919 a Spanish Navy commission arrived in the Netherlands to conduct the trials. Werf Conrad refused to allow the Spaniards to conduct the trials and threatened to terminate the 1915 contract unilaterally and sell the ship to the highest bidder. The Spanish commission returned to Spain in July 1919 without having carried out the trials.

A lawsuit over the ship's delivery worked its way slowly through the Dutch court system, causing several more months of delay and prompting intervention by the Spanish Ministry of State and the Dutch Ministry of Foreign Affairs. Meanwhile, the Spanish Navy began to question the wisdom of acquiring the ship in the first place, given that World War I had ended and that neither the British Royal Navy or the French Navy had purchased submarine rescue ships despite having substantial submarine forces. Finally, despite viewing Werf Conrad's stance as one in bad faith, the Spanish Ministry of the Navy decided to accept most of Werf Conrad's conditions so as to avoid a lengthy, costly, and uncertain legal process before a foreign court. The ministry reached an agreement on payment and delivery of the ship with Werf Conrad in the summer of 1920. On 2 September 1920, a new Spanish Navy commission chaired by the head of the Submarine Force, Capitán de corbeta (Corvette Captain) Mateo García de los Reyes — a future contralmirante (counter admiral) and minister of the navy — was appointed for the final acceptance of the ship. After successfully completing her sea trials, the ship — as yet lacking an official name — departed Amsterdam with a Spanish crew on 18 November 1920 to begin her delivery voyage to Spain, escorted by the troopship Almirante Lobo. The ships encountered rough weather during the trip and the new submarine rescue ship sustained damage. They called at Ferrol — where the new ship underwent repairs — from 24 November to 4 December 1920. The two ships then got back underway and proceeded to the Arsenal de La Carraca at San Fernando, which they reached on 8 December 1920. After a brief stop there, the new ship set course for Cartagena, again encountering rough weather before arriving in mid-December 1920.

A royal decree of 21 December 1920 created the Spanish Navy's submarine training division and assigned to it the new submarine rescue ship, two torpedo boats, and Spain's first four operational submarines, namely Isaac Peral (A-0) and the A-class submarines Narciso Monturiol (A-1), Cosme García (A-2), and A-3. Replacing the protected cruiser Extremadura, which had served as a submarine tender for the fledgling Spanish submarine force since 1917, the new ship was attached to the submarine base at the Cartagena Naval Base, where she was placed temporarily in a reserve status on 15 January 1921. Spanish sailors had taken to calling her "Kanguro" — based on her being a ship known commercially as a "Kanguroo" type after the earlier Peruvian Navy ship of that name and mixing the spelling "Kanguroo" with that of canguro, the Spanish word for "kangaroo" — and by royal decree she officially received the name Kanguro upon her commissioning on 26 January 1921.}

== Service history ==
=== Kingdom of Spain 1921–1931 ===
Kanguro (left) and Almirante Lobo (right) moored at Barcelona in September 1921 with submarines and torpedo boats between them.

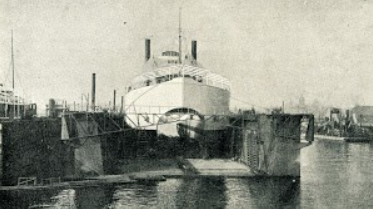
Kanguro in a floating drydock in a photograph published in 1921.

In September 1921, the submarine training division conducted a training cruise in the Mediterranean Sea. After departing Cartagena, Kanguro, Isaac Peral, Narciso Monturiol, Cosme García, A-3, and the torpedo boats No. 1, No. 3, No. 21, and No. 22 visited Alicante and Gandía before calling at Valencia from 8 to 9 September. They then made a stop at Vinaròs before proceeding to Barcelona.

The Barcelona visit lasted a week, and took place to allow Minister of the Navy José Gómez Acedo and the chief of the naval staff, Vicealmirante (Vice Admiral) Salvador Buhigas, to review the Spanish Navy's submarine and torpedo boat flotillas and demonstrate for them the navy's newest acquisitions. Kanguro arrived at Barcelona on the afternoon of 12 September 1921, followed by Isaac Peral, Narciso Monturiol, Cosme García, and A-3 and then by the torpedo boats No. 1, No. 5, No. 21, and No. 22. There to meet them were Almirante Lobo — which had arrived at Barcelona on the afternoon of 11 September 1921 carrying two seaplanes of the Spanish Naval Air Arm — as well as the destroyer Audaz and the protected cruiser Río de la Plata. What followed were the Spanish Navy's first sea-and-air exercises.

Amidst a thick fog that later dissipated, the two flotillas got underway at 09:30 on 13 September 1921 to begin maneuvers. With crowds looking on from shore and aboard private boats, Kanguro and the torpedo boats left port first, followed later by Almirante Lobo and the submarines. Two seaplanes also took off, and a tethered balloon was launched. Kanguro stood by while the submarines carried out various activities during the day. At her anchorage in Barcelona on 14 September, Kanguro conducted a test of her lifting equipment in which A-3 positioned herself under Kanguro and Kanguro lifted her out of the water. Kanguro′s crew inspected A-3′s hull, then Kanguro lowered A-3 back into the water.

On the morning of 19 September, Kanguro weighed anchor and led the squadron out of the harbor, followed by the submarines and then the torpedo boats. Almirante Lobo and Audaz accompanied them. With Gómez Acedo and Buhigas embarked on Narciso Monturiol, the vessels conducted diving maneuvers and antisubmarine warfare exercises with naval aircraft. The activities concluded later in the morning, and Gómez Acedo and Buhigas transferred from Narciso Monturiol to Audaz and then to Río de la Plata. Meanwhile, Kanguro and the rest of the submarine training division resumed their training cruise later in the day, next visiting Mahón on Menorca in the Balearic Islands before calling at Valencia again and then returning to Cartagena.

Kanguro made a voyage to the Canary Islands in 1922, and later that year conducted a Mediterranean cruise during which she displayed and demonstrated her capabilities at various ports. She departed Cádiz on 4 October 1922 in company with Isaac Peral, Cosme García, A-3, the new submarines B-1, B-2, and B-3 and the tug Cíclope and accompanied the submarines on their voyage to Cartagena.

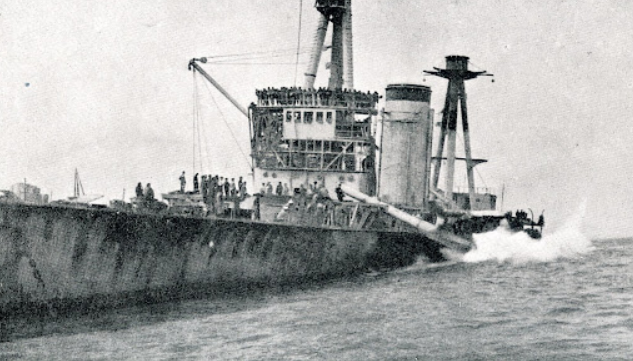
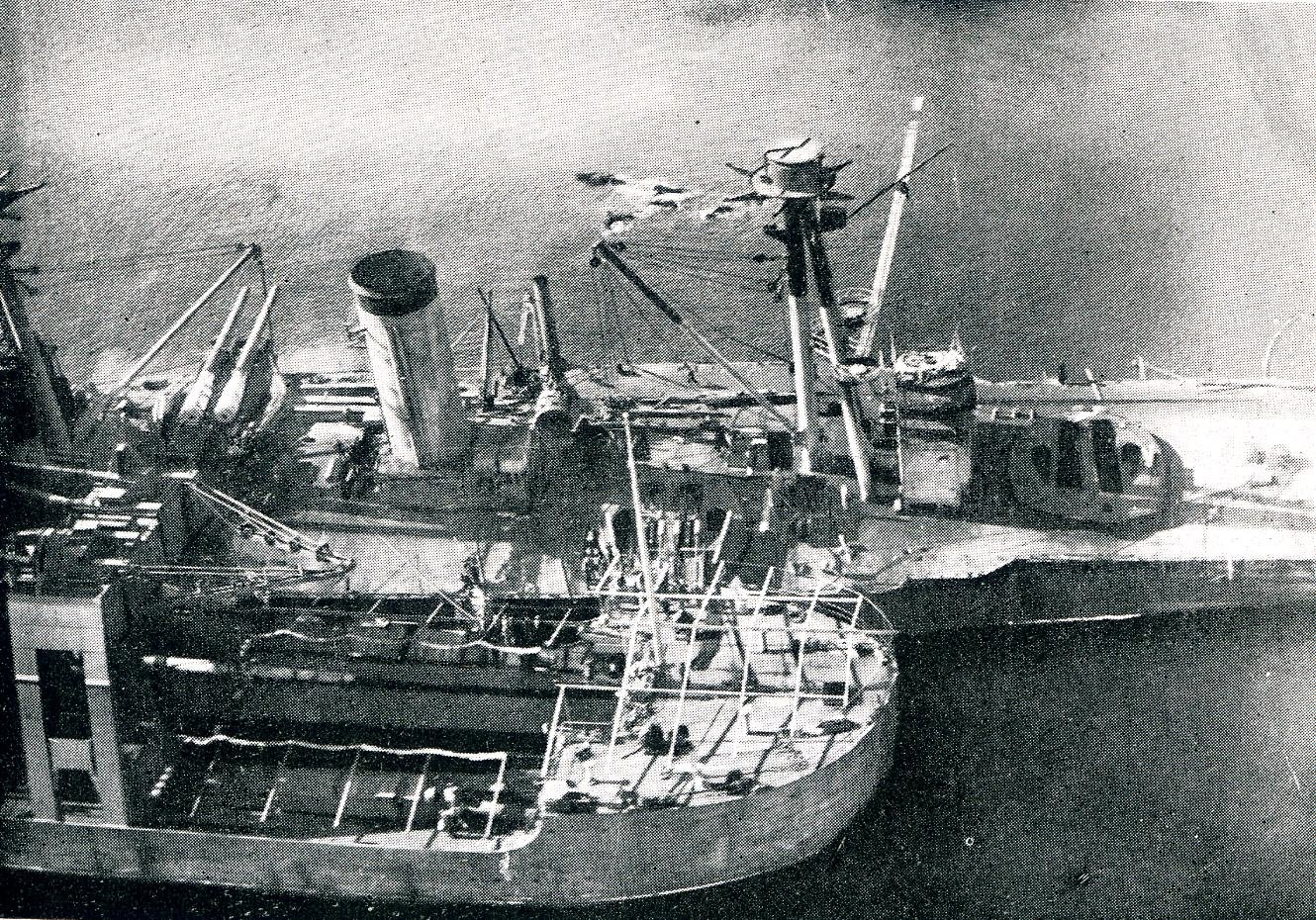
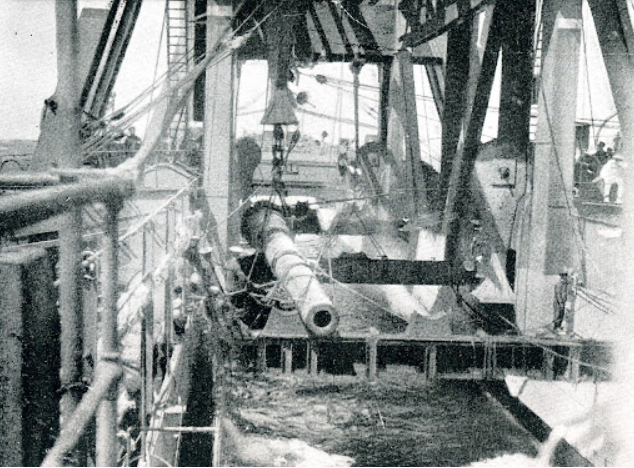
Salvaging the guns of the stranded battleship España at Cape Three Forks on the coast of North Africa in 1924. LEFT: The salvage crew dumps a 305 mm (12-inch) gun from the forward turret overboard.
CENTER: Kanguro alongside España to recover the guns from the seabed.
RIGHT: One of España′s 305 mm (12-inch) guns aboard Kanguro.

Kanguro never recovered a sunken submarine, but she did use her capabilities to operate as a salvage ship after the battleship España ran hard aground at Cape Three Forks on the coast of North Africa in heavy fog on 26 August 1923. A year of salvage operations went by with España still stubbornly aground, so during 1924 the Spanish Navy decided to lighten her to help refloat her. This included the removal of España′s 305-millimetre (12-inch) and 102-millimetre (4-inch) guns. After considering the option of acquiring or renting a floating crane powerful enough to lift the guns off España and load them onto barges brought to North Africa from Cartagena, the Spanish Navy decided instead to dispatch Kanguro to the scene to salvage the guns. Salvage crews detached the guns from España and dumped them overboard, and Kanguro used her lifting mechanism to recover the guns from the seabed. This operation took place in September and October 1924, and Kanguro recovered the guns to the complete satisfaction of the salvage commission and transported them to Cartagena. España herself broke up and sank in a storm in November 1924 before she could be refloated, but the guns Kanguro recovered became part of Spain's coastal artillery force, some of them remaining in service until 1999.

In 1926, the Spanish Navy's submarine training division at Cartagena consisted of Kanguro, A-3, B-2, B-3, and the submarines B-4, B-5, and B-6. When the C-class submarines began to enter service in the late 1920s, Kanguro′s career became quieter, with her spending most of her time at Cartagena tending submarines.

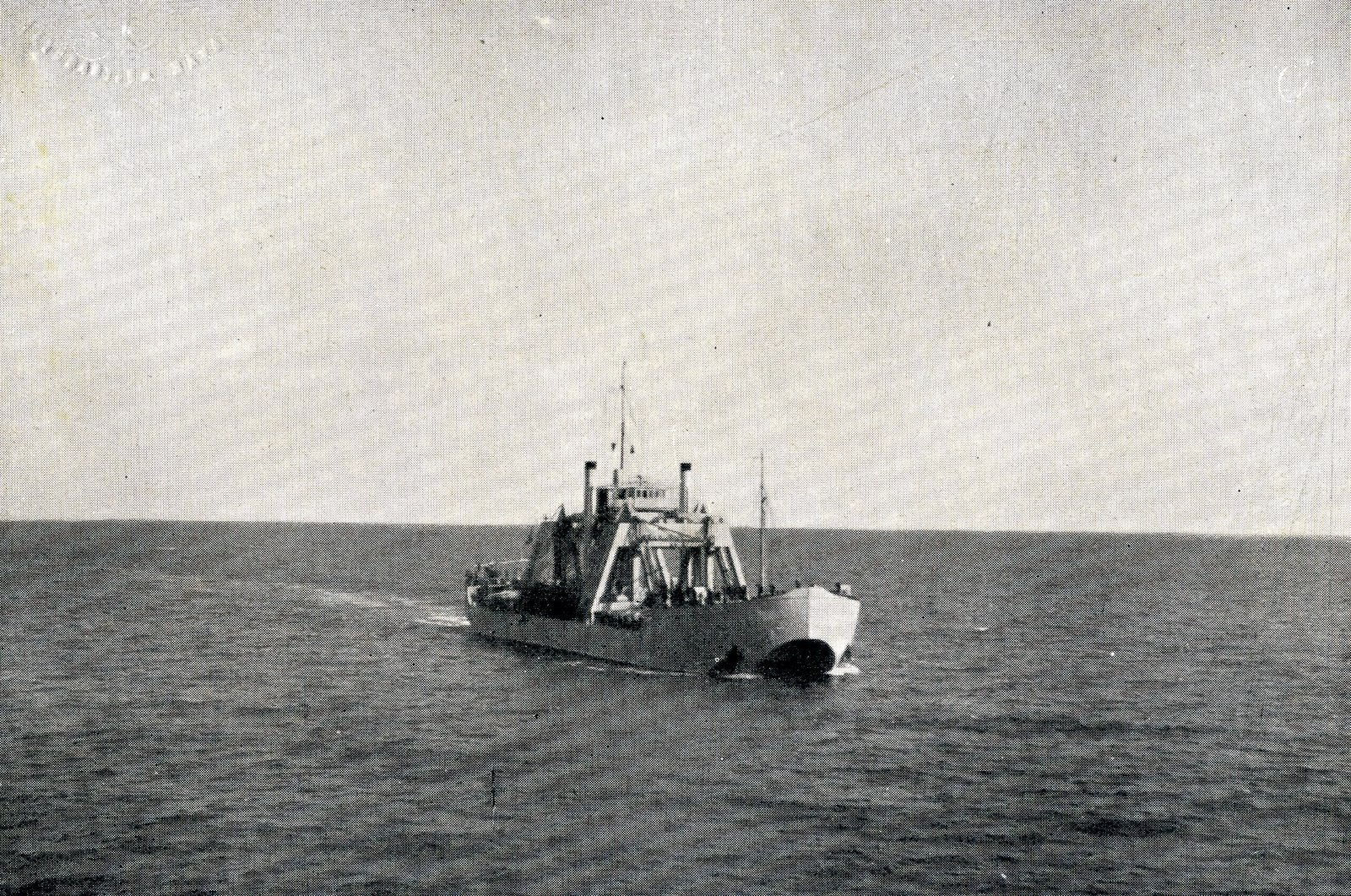
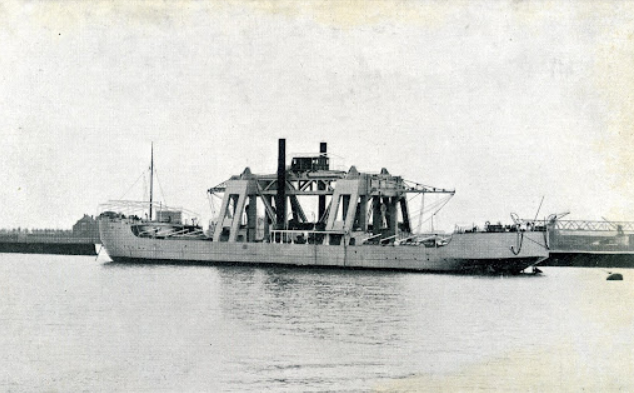
LEFT: Kanguro at sea during maneuvers in a photograph published in 1930.
RIGHT: A photograph of Kanguro seen from her port side, published in 1921.

In 1930, Kanguro and the torpedo stations at Cartagena and Mahón participated in theoretical and experimental studies of underwater explosions under high pressure and their effects on the seabed at great depths. They were the first such studies in Europe.

=== Second Spanish Republic, 1931–1936 ===
On 14 April 1931, the Second Spanish Republic was proclaimed, replacing the Kingdom of Spain. The Spanish Navy came under the republic's control as the Spanish Republican Navy.

When the Revolution of 1934 broke out in Spain in October 1934, authorities at the Cartagena Naval Base already had identified a number of personnel planning to incite an uprising at the base. The conspirators were arrested and placed under guard by a strong force of Spanish Marine Infantrymen aboard Kanguro. With the conspirators and their guards embarked, Kanguro got underway and loitered at sea off Cartagena for a few days until the situation at Cartagena calmed.

On 1 April 1936, Kanguro was placed in a lower readiness status with a reduced crew. Her last chief engineer disembarked in June 1936, and she no longer had a medical officer.

=== Spanish Civil War, 1936–1939 ===
On 17 July 1936, the Spanish Civil War began, with Nationalist forces under Francisco Franco opposing Republican forces which remained loyal to the Second Spanish Republic. Kanguro was in poor condition and under repair at the Cartagena Naval Base when the war broke out. On the morning of 20 July, she received a radio message from the Republican destroyer Almirante Valdés warning her crew that their officers were suspected of Nationalist sympathies. The radioman on duty aboard Kanguro passed the message to her commanding officer. Soon afterward, a tug carrying armed sailors from the Cartagena Naval Base came alongside Kanguro, and these sailors informed Kanguro′s crew that they had come to board Kanguro and arrest her officers. Kanguro′s crew looked on without taking sides while her officers were arrested, taken to the naval base's headquarters, searched, held captive for a few hours, given civilian clothes, and ordered to go home by the naval base's commander.

Kanguro was under Republican control for the entire war. She remained inactive at Cartagena throughout the conflict, although during the war she became the flagship of the Cartagena Anti-Submarine Surveillance and Defense Flotilla when it was created in 1937. The war ended on 1 April 1939 with a Nationalist victory and the establishment of Francoist Spain.

=== Francoist Spain, 1939–1943 ===
At the end of the Spanish Civil War, Kanguro became part of the reconstituted Spanish Navy under the control of the new government. With the loss or retirement of all the B-class submarines during the war, Kanguro was deemed unnecessary, and she was placed in reserve on 1 May 1939 and decommissioned on 20 October 1939. However, naval authorities reconsidered this decision, and she was recommissioned on 1 February 1940 and assigned to the Cartagena Maritime Department. She was decommissioned for a second and final time on 23 November 1943 and was scrapped in 1946.

Kanguro′s two 600 hp (447 kW) engines had seen relatively little use for a ship of her age and were in very good condition, however, and in March 1943 the Spanish Navy's Directorate of Naval Construction and Military Naval Industries received orders to study the design of a vessel that could use the engines. This resulted in the installation of one of Kanguro′s engines in each of the patrol vessels Procyon and Pegaso, which were nicknamed the "Kanguritos" or "Canguritos" ("Little Kangaroos") for this reason. Shipyard workers building them also gave them the individual nicknames "Porción" ("Portion") and "Pedazo" ("Piece"), respectively, because each contained a portion, or a piece, of Kanguro. Procyon and Pegaso served in the Spanish Navy from 1951 to 1974, meaning that their engines, which arrived in Spain in 1920 in Kanguro′s delivery voyage from the Netherlands, had given the Spanish Navy 54 years of service before they were retired.

Kanguro′s lifting mechanism also was in good condition at the time of her decommissioning, so the Spanish Navy stored it at the Cartagena Naval Base pending its possible reuse. The Spanish Navy's submarine school requested that it be installed in a vessel capable of operating as a salvage ship and submarine tender. Accordingly, the Spanish Navy in late 1950 began to study the idea of incorporating Kanguro′s mechanism into a new ship. The planning project evenually reached an advanced stage, envisioning a ship with a full-load displacement of 1,047 tons, two 1,200 hp (895 kW) diesel engines, a length of 62.20 metres (204 ft 1 in), a beam of 11 metres (36 ft 1 in), a depth of hull of 5.60 metres (18 ft 4 in), and a mean draft of 2.53 metres (8 ft 4 in) at full load. In the end, the Spanish Navy dropped plans to build this new ship and sold Kanguro′s lifting equipment to the Madrid-based company Hierros y Metales, S.A., in early 1953.

== See also ==
- List of historic Spanish Navy ships
