= A Graña =

A Graña is a village and Spanish Navy naval station, submarine base, and shipyard, located in northwestern Spain. It is an integral part of the Naval Military Complex of Ferrol.

== Geography ==
The village lies at an altitude of 11 metres (36 feet) on the Ferrol inlet at 43.482°N 008.260°W, some 800 metres (870 yards) by sea from the Naval Station of Ferrol. The area is semi-urban. It has a port for small boats and a boat club.

== History ==
Established during the middle of the 18th century, A Graña was the first arsenal on the Ferrol inlet. On 25 August 1800, British forces landed on the beach near A Graña and launched the unsuccessful Ferrol Expedition as part of the War of the Second Coalition during the Napoleonic Wars.
