= Spanish battleship España =

Dreadnought battleship of the Spanish Navy

- Illustration of España in 1912

History

Spain
- Name: España
- Namesake: Spain
- Builder: SECN, El Ferrol
- Laid down: 6 December 1909
- Launched: 5 February 1912
- Commissioned: 23 October 1913
- Fate: Ran aground off Cape Tres Forcas 26 August 1923, partially scrapped in situ

General characteristics
- Class & type: España-class battleship
- Displacement: Normal: 15,700 t (15,500 long tons); Full load: 16,450 t (16,190 long tons)
- Length: 140 m (459 ft 4 in) o/a
- Beam: 24 m (78 ft 9 in)
- Draft: 7.8 m (25 ft 7 in)
- Installed power: 12 × Yarrow boilers; 15,500 shp (11,600 kW)
- Propulsion: 4 × steam turbines; 4 × screw propellers
- Speed: 19.5 knots (36.1 km/h)
- Range: 5,000 nmi (9,300 km) at 10 knots (19 km/h)
- Complement: 854
- Armament: 8 × 305 mm (12 in) guns; 20 × 102 mm (4 in) guns; 4 × 47 mm (1.9 in) 3-pounder guns; 2 × machine guns
- Armor: Belt armor: 203 mm (8 in); Deck: 38 mm (1 in); Turrets: 203 mm; Conning tower: 254 mm (10 in)

España was a Spanish dreadnought battleship, the lead ship of the España class, the two other ships being Alfonso XIII and Jaime I. The ship was built in the early 1910s in the context of a cooperative defensive agreement with Britain and France, as part of a naval construction program to restore the fleet after the losses of the Spanish–American War. She was the only member of the class to be completed before the start of World War I, which significantly delayed completion of the other vessels. The ships were armed with a main battery of eight 305 mm (12 in) guns and were intended to support the French Navy in the event of a major European war.

Because Spain remained neutral at the start of the war, España and her sisters were the only European dreadnoughts to avoid wartime service. She represented Spain at the opening of the Panama Canal in early 1915. In the late 1910s, she served in the 1st Squadron, but by 1920, the Spanish fleet had been reorganized and España and her sisters were assigned to the Training Squadron. The ship embarked on a major cruise to South America in 1920, during which she accidentally ran aground. The accident caused significant damage that required extensive repairs before she could return to Spain. España and the rest of the Spanish fleet supported forces fighting in the Rif War starting in 1921, and while bombarding rebel positions near Cape Tres Forcas, Morocco, in August 1923, the ship ran aground again. She could not be easily freed, though by November 1924, work on lightening the ship was nearly completed when severe storms destroyed the wreck. Some of her guns that were removed during salvage operations were used as coastal artillery as late as 1999.

== Design ==
Line-drawing of the España class

Following the destruction of much of the Spanish fleet in the Spanish–American War of 1898, the Spanish Navy made a series of failed attempts to begin the process of rebuilding. After the First Moroccan Crisis strengthened Spain's ties to Britain and France and public support for rearmament increased in its aftermath, the Spanish government came to an agreement with those countries for a plan of mutual defense. In exchange for British and French support for Spain's defense, the Spanish fleet would support the French Navy in the event of war with the Triple Alliance. A strengthened Spanish fleet was thus in the interests of Britain and France, which accordingly provided technical assistance in the development of modern warships, the contracts for which were awarded to the firm Spanish Sociedad Española de Construcción Naval (SECN), which was formed by the British shipbuilders Vickers, Armstrong Whitworth, and John Brown & Company. The vessels were authorized some six months after the British had completed the "all-big-gun" HMS Dreadnought, and after discarding plans to build pre-dreadnought-type battleships, the naval command quickly decided to build their own dreadnoughts, the first of which was España.

España was 132.6 m (435 ft) long at the waterline and 140 m (459 ft 4 in) long overall. She had a beam of 24 m (79 ft) and a draft of 7.8 m (25 ft 7 in); her freeboard was 15 ft (15 ft 0 in) amidships. The ship displaced 15,700 t (15,500 long tons) as designed and up to 16,450 t (16,190 long tons) at full load. Her propulsion system consisted of four-shaft Parsons steam turbines driving four screw propellers, with steam provided by twelve Yarrow boilers. The engines were rated at 15,500 shaft horsepower (11,600 kW) and produced a top speed of 19.5 knots (36.1 km/h; 22.4 mph). España had a cruising radius of 5,000 nautical miles (9,300 km; 5,800 mi) at a speed of 10 knots (19 km/h; 12 mph). Her crew consisted of 854 officers and enlisted men.

España was armed with a main battery of eight 305 mm (12 in) 50-caliber guns, mounted in four twin gun turrets. One turret was placed forward, two were positioned en echelon amidships, and the fourth was aft of the superstructure. This mounting scheme was chosen in preference to superfiring turrets, such as were installed in the American South Carolina-class battleships, to save weight and cost. For defense against torpedo boats, she carried a secondary battery that consisted of twenty 102 mm (4 in) guns mounted individually in casemates along the length of the hull. They were too close to the waterline, however, which made them unusable in heavy seas. She was also armed with four 3-pounder guns and two machine guns. Her armored belt was 203 mm (8 in) thick amidships; the main battery turrets were protected with the same amount of armor plate. The conning tower had 254 mm (10 in) thick sides. Her armored deck was 38 mm (1.5 in) thick.

== Service history ==
Top: Profile of España as she appeared in 1913
Bottom: España as she appeared in 1923

The Navy Law of 7 January 1908 authorized construction of España. She was laid down at the SECN shipyard in Ferrol on 6 December 1909. She was launched on 5 February 1912 and delivered on 8 September 1913, though some work continued until 23 October, when she was commissioned. That month, the French President Raymond Poincaré visited Spain, and during his stay he came aboard España. While aboard, he met the ship's gunnery officer, Jaime Janer Róbinson, upon whom Poincaré later conferred the Légion d'honneur in 1914 for his work developing Spanish gunnery training. Róbinson was the Spanish Navy's leading expert on modern gunnery systems, and his appointment to España allowed him to install the first modern fire-control system in the Spanish fleet. After conducting her shakedown cruise and initial training, the ship participated in gunnery trials in June 1914, after which the vessel was ready for service. The July Crisis that arose in the aftermath of the assassination of Archduke Franz Ferdinand led to the start of World War I at the end of the month, though Italy initially declared neutrality, allowing Spain to do the same. The Italians later joined the Allies the following year, and as a result, España and her sisters were the only European dreadnoughts to avoid the war.

After she entered service, she joined the 1st Squadron of the Spanish fleet, where she was eventually joined by her two sister ships as they were completed. In February 1915, España crossed the Atlantic to represent Spain at the opening ceremonies for the Panama Canal. Since the major European navies were occupied with World War I, only Spain and Portugal sent ships to the ceremonies, along with South American fleets. After her sister Alfonso XIII entered service in mid-1915, the two battleships sailed to Santander, where King Alfonso XIII was aboard his royal yacht Giralda. The two battleships then took part in training exercises off Galicia.

In 1920, España was sent on a major cruise to South American waters, departing on 14 June and steaming first to the major ports in the mouth of the Río de la Plata. She carried the Spanish representative to the quatercentenary of the discovery of the Straits of Magellan in Chile, in the process becoming the Spanish Navy's first ship to pass through the Panama Canal. On 29 January 1921 she ran aground in Chilean waters off Puerto Montt on her return to Spain, though she was refloated with some difficulty. Her hull was dented badly for a length of 150 ft (46 m), and the rocks tore a large hole that was approximately 8 by 8 ft (2.4 by 2.4 m) between frames 22 and 36, and several smaller holes between frames 48 to 56 on the port side and 58 to 76 on the starboard side. Divers effected temporary repairs with concrete in Chile, followed by permanent repairs that were made in Balboa, Panama before she made her return voyage across the Atlantic.

=== Rif War and loss ===
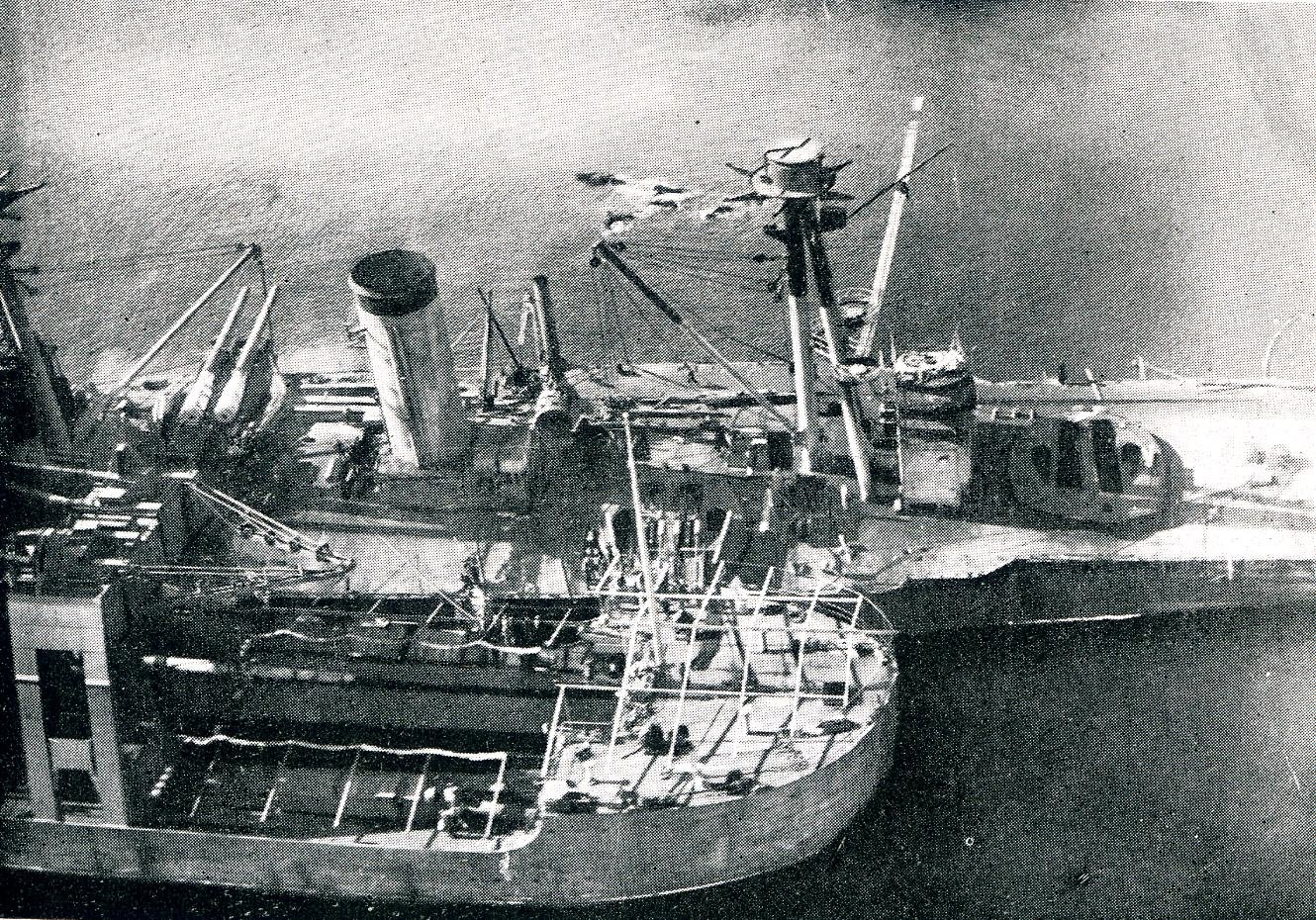
The submarine rescue ship Kanguro salvaging España's guns in 1924.

Throughout the early 1920s, she provided fire support to the Spanish Army in its campaigns in Morocco during the Rif War that had broken out in mid-1921. On 17 September, she and Alfonso XIII bombarded Rif positions south of Melilla while Spanish Foreign Legion troops assaulted the positions. While conducting a bombardment off Cape Tres Forcas near Melilla on 26 August 1923, España ran hard aground owing to heavy fog. Alfonso XIII came alongside to take off her crew before salvage operations began. The Spanish Navy hired two salvage companies to re-float the battleship, but both declined after they surveyed the wreck.

Unable to raise her under normal conditions, the Navy decided to remove as much weight as possible from España in an attempt to lighten her to permit re-floating. Her guns were removed and dropped overboard to be picked up later by the submarine rescue ship Kanguro. Much of the battleship's armor, machinery, and ammunition stores were also removed to lighten her. Her hull was then sealed and partially drained in preparation for raising, but while waiting for the necessary equipment from Italy, several violent storms hit the ship and caused further damage by 19 November, some three weeks before she was scheduled to be re-floated. The battered hull could now no longer be raised, and in November 1924, she broke in half and was abandoned by the Spanish Navy.

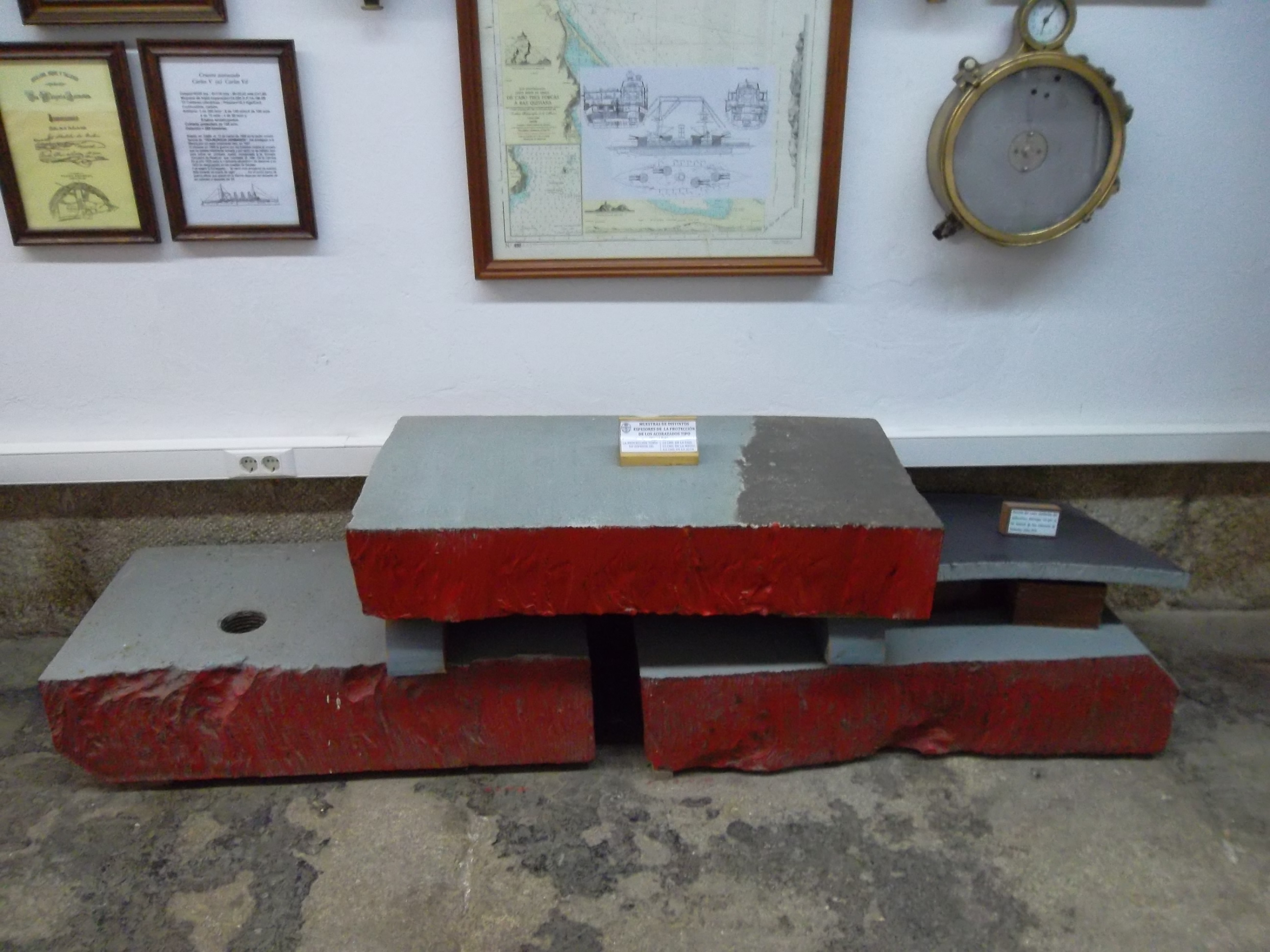
Sections of armor plate removed from España during the effort to lighten her

The 305 mm and 102 mm guns recovered from España were later installed in batteries of coastal artillery. Three of the 305 mm guns, designated the La Marquina Battery, were placed at Cádiz in single mounts in 1953; each gun was placed in a new turret mount with an enclosed gun shield atop a concrete emplacement that included a magazine, fire direction, generator, and other support rooms. Some of the batteries remained in service until 1999 before they were retired from service. By 2009, two of the La Marquina guns had been removed, but the third was retained as a display. After the overthrow of King Alfonso XIII, his namesake ship Alfonso XIII was renamed España in April 1931.
