= Spanish submarine Isaac Peral (A-0) =

Spanish submarine

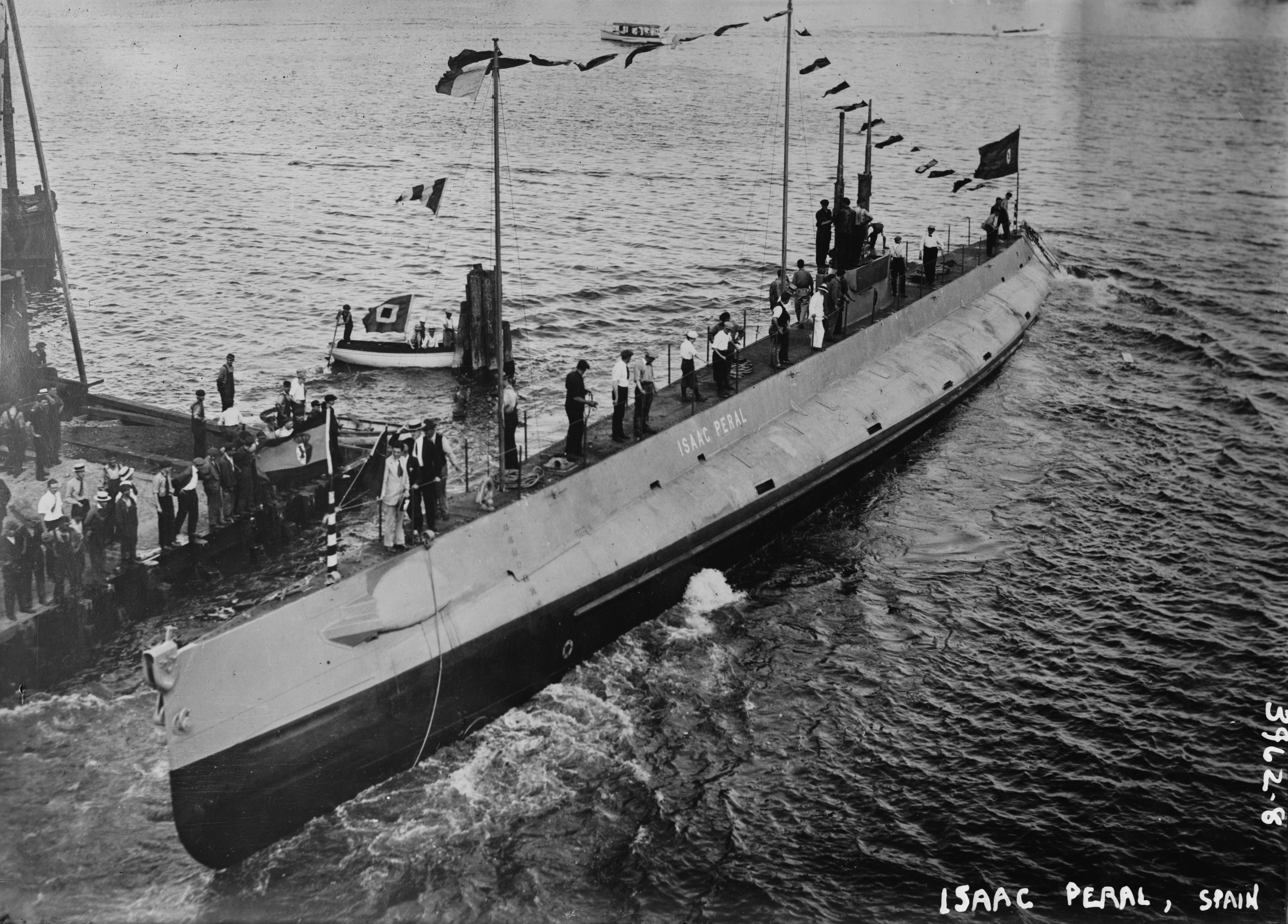
- Isaac Peral leaving Quincy in 1916

History

Spain
- Name: Isaac Peral
- Builder: Fore River & Co
- Cost: 3,383,500 pesetas
- Laid down: 21 September 1915
- Launched: 22 July 1916
- Commissioned: 25 January 1917
- Out of service: 18 May 1932
- Home port: Cartagena
- Fate: Sold for scrap

General characteristics
- Type: Submarine
- Displacement: 492 t (surfaced); 653.8 t (submerged)
- Length: 57.95 m (190 ft 1 in)
- Beam: 5.8 m (19 ft 0 in)
- Height: 5.06 m (16 ft 7 in)
- Draught: 4.8 m (15 ft 9 in)
- Depth: 50 m (160 ft)
- Installed power: 600 hp (surfaced); 340 hp (submerged)
- Range: 3,700 nmi (6,900 km)
- Crew: 28

Isaac Peral (A-0) was the first operational submarine deployed by the Spanish Navy. It was built in the United States at the Fore River Shipyard based on the design of USS M-1. The ship was purchased under the terms of the "Ley Miranda" and had a career spanning 15 years during which it saw action in the Rif War.

== Design ==
The submarine was identical to the American USS M-1, a Holland-class 903-L series. It had a displacement of 500 tonnes (742 tonnes when submerged). Its length was of 60.01 metres (196 ft 11 in), a beam of 5.8 metres (19 ft 0 in) and 5.10 metres (16 ft 9 in) of depth under keel. Its maximum depth was 50 metres (164 ft 1 in). Its maximum crew capacity was 28 submariners.

It was equipped with two NLSECO 600 CV diesel engines and two 340 CV electric motors which gave it a top speed of 15 knots (28 km/h; 17 mph) on the surface and 10.5 knots (19.4 km/h; 12.1 mph) while submerged. It had an autonomy of 3,700 nautical miles (6,900 km; 4,300 mi) at 11 knots (20 km/h; 13 mph) on the surface and 80 nautical miles (150 km; 92 mi) at 4.5 knots (8.3 km/h; 5.2 mph) while submerged.

It was armed with a partially retractable 3-inch/23-calibre deck gun developed by Bethlehem Steel Co. and four 450 mm torpedo tubes mounted at the bow with eight torpedoes in total.

== Development ==
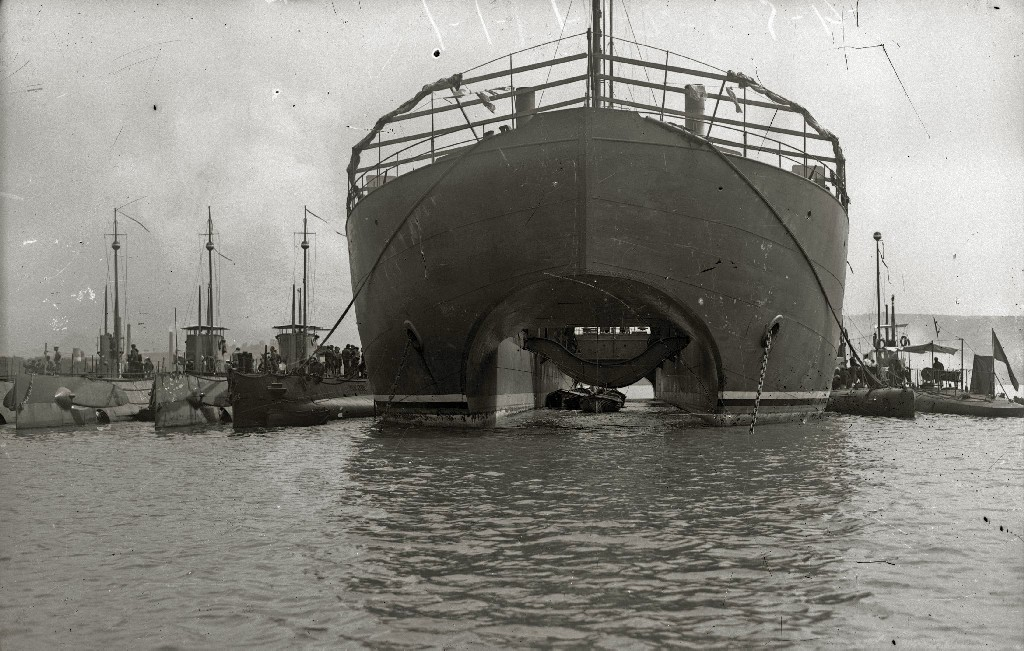
Spanish Navy submarine rescue ship Kanguro next to submarines at Pasaia in 1922.

The Spanish government officially approved the acquisition of its first submarines on 17 February 1915. Under the "Ley Miranda", so called in honour of its promoter, the admiral and then Minister of the Navy, Augusto Miranda.

The original plan called for the construction of 28 units, however, the government felt the need to accelerate the creation of a submarine force and consequently, authorized Miranda to buy the first four units from other nations, along with all the equipment needed to maintain and train the personnel needed to create a submarine force for the nation.

The first to be acquired was the so called Isaac Peral. Named after the Spanish Navy officer and inventor. It was ordered from the Fore River & Co in 1915. Construction began in September and lasted ten months. The total cost was of 3,383,500 Pta.

== Operational history ==
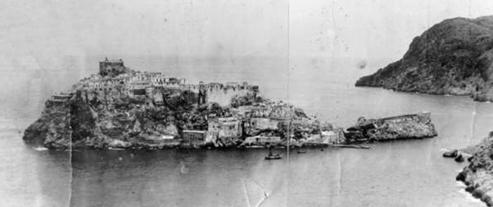
Photography of the Peñón Vélez de Gomera in 1920.

The submarine was launched on 22 July 1916 from the Fore River Shipyard in Quincy, Massachusetts.

In 1917, near the end of its testing, and fearing the requisition of the submarine by the United States (who was then embroiled in the First World War in contrast to the neutrality of Spain), it was decided to prematurely leave Boston. It first reached Spain on 28 April 1917, arriving at Puerto de la Luz in the Canary Islands. Having sailed 4,000 nautical miles (7,400 km; 4,600 mi) and suffering damage to both its hull and machine room, it had to be repaired by the Grand Canary Slipway & Engineering Co.

During April 1922, in the early phase of the Rif War, Isaac Peral, along with B-1 carried out the evacuation of non-combatants and wounded personnel of the Peñón Vélez de la Gomera. Under the command of Mateo García de los Reyes and escorted by the battleship España, on the night of 17 April both submarines travelled from Melilla to Veléz de la Gomera. There, over two nights and under enemy fire, the submarines evacuated 106 people before returning to Cartagena. This was the first combat operation carried by the Spanish submarine service. Later, in June and July 1922, Isaac Peral and B-1 provided escort to convoys supplying the garrison of the Peñón de Alhucemas, then under siege by Riffian forces.

In January 1927 the submarine was careened and modernized at Ferrol. The letter P was added to the side of its hull. On 28 August 1930, its name was formally changed from Isaac Peral to A-0. Its service life came to an end on 18 May 1932, when it was stricken and sold for scrap for 35,000 Pta.

== Commendations ==
On 28 April 2015, during the VI Jornadas Navales, the town of Puerto de la Luz commemorated 98 years from the transit of the submarine on its way to Cartagena. A plaque was placed in the harbour in an act with presence from local authority and industry and Spanish Navy representatives.
