= 1939 Cartagena uprising =

Spanish Civil War uprising

Cartagena uprising
- Part of the Spanish Civil War and the Spanish coup of March 1939
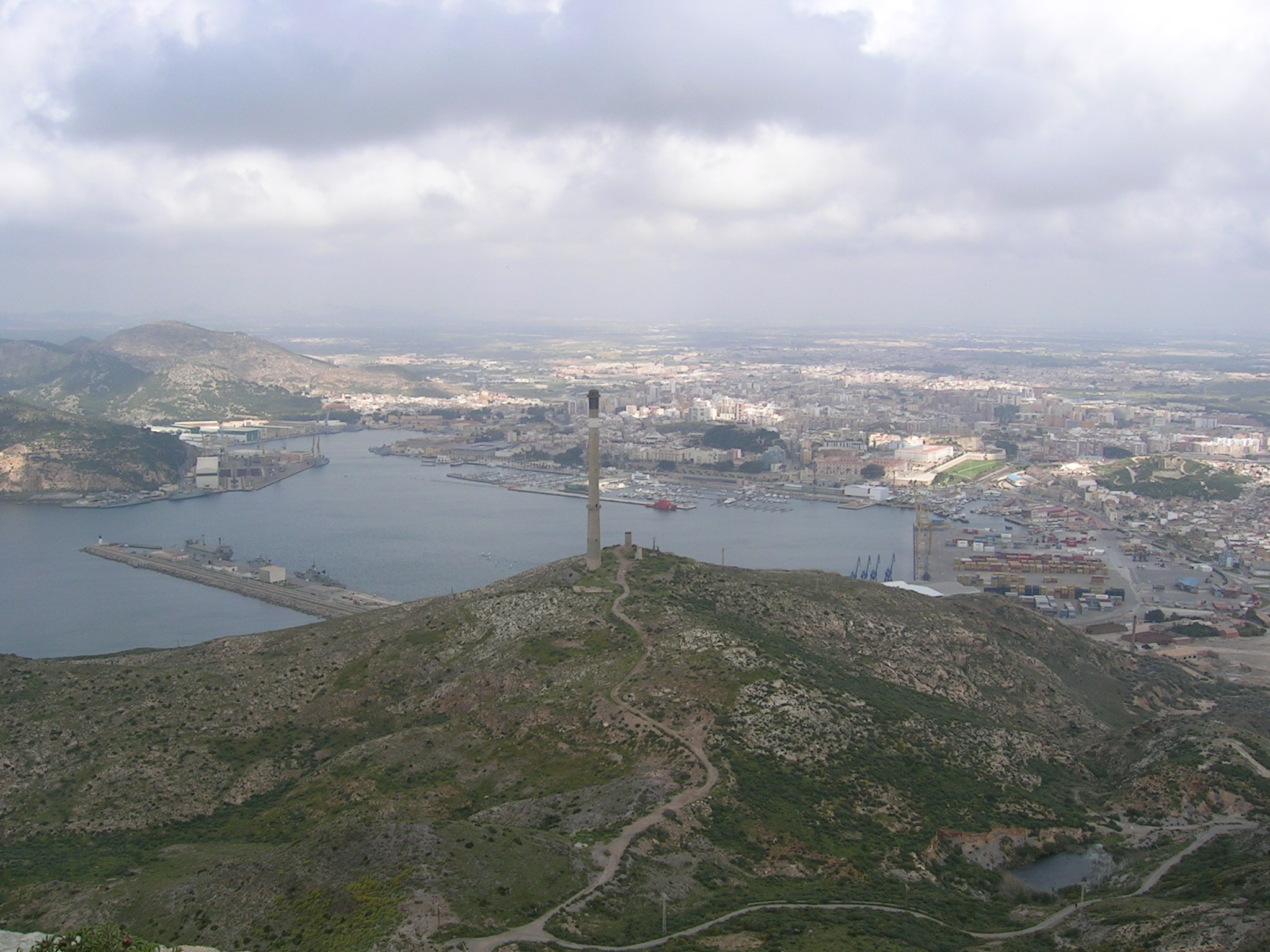
- Cartagena
Date	4–7 March 1939
Location	Cartagena, Second Spanish Republic
Result	See aftermath: Uprising suppressed; Republican Navy fleet interned in French Tunisia; Sinking of the Castillo de Olite

Belligerents
Spanish Republic	Nationalist Spain (Francoist Spain) Fifth column: (Second Spanish Republic) Supporters of Segismundo Casado

Commanders and leaders
(Second Spanish Republic) Francisco Galán (Second Spanish Republic) Artemio Precioso (Second Spanish Republic) Miguel Buiza	(Francoist Spain) Arturo Espa (Francoist Spain) Rafael Barrionuevo: (Second Spanish Republic) Gerardo Armentia †

Strength
1 brigade 3 cruisers 8 destroyers	Cartagena's garrison 2 auxiliary cruisers

Casualties and losses
61 dead (including fifth columnists)	Cartagena's garrison 1 transport ship sunk 1,476 dead and 700 prisoners

The Cartagena uprising (Spanish: Sublevación de Cartagena) was an uprising that occurred in Cartagena during the Spanish Civil War from 4 to 7 March 1939.

Soldiers of the Spanish Republican Army sympathetic to Segismundo Casado launched a rebellion against the Republican government of Juan Negrín in Cartagena, the main base of the Spanish Republican Navy. The rebels supported by a fifth column managed to gain control over most of Cartagena and appeal to the Nationalists for assistance. The Republican Navy fleet in Cartagena fled to French Tunisia where the ships were interned before the city was retaken by Republican loyalists and a Nationalist landing was cancelled. The Republicans defeated the uprising but lost most of their remaining naval fleet.

The Nationalist troop transport SS Castillo de Olite sent to support the revolt was sunk with 1,476 soldiers being killed, the deadliest in Spanish naval history.

== Background ==
After the fall of Catalonia in February 1939, the military situation of the Republic was hopeless – it still held the capital Madrid and 30% of Spanish territory, but the Spanish Republican Army had lost 220,000 soldiers, the second-largest city Barcelona, and Catalonia's arms industry. Furthermore, on 27 February, Republican President Manuel Azaña resigned and the United Kingdom and France recognized the Francoist government of Spain. The high commanders of the Republican Army believed that further military resistance was impossible, but the Prime Minister Juan Negrín, backed by the Communist Party of Spain (PCE), wanted to continue resistance. Colonel Segismundo Casado, who sought peace with the Nationalists, planned a coup d'etat against Negrín with the support of generals Manuel Matallana and José Miaja, the CNT trade union led by Cipriano Mera, the secret service of the Republic SIM, a section of the Spanish Socialist Workers' Party (PSOE) led by Julián Besteiro, and a section of the Workers' General Union led by Wenceslao Carrillo.

== Uprising ==
On 3 March, Negrín appointed Francisco Galán, a member of the PCE, to command the main naval base of the Spanish Republican Navy at Cartagena. On 4 March, Galán arrived in Cartagena to take over command but the supporters of Casado, led by the colonel Gerardo Armentia, revolted and arrested him. Then, the fifth column in the city led by Colonel Arturo Espa, joined the rebellion and seized the coastal batteries of Los Dolores and the radio station, from where they broadcast appeals for help from the Nationalists. Rafael Barrionuevo, a retired general living in the city, proclaimed himself military governor.

On 5 March, the Nationalist air force bombed the harbour of Cartagena, sinking Spanish Republican Navy destroyer Sánchez Barcáiztegui. As a result, Commander Miguel Buiza ordered the bulk of the fleet, which included cruisers Miguel de Cervantes, Libertad and Mendez Nuñez, as well as eight destroyers, to flee to Oran in French Algeria. Galán was freed by the rebels when the Republican Navy threatened to bombard Cartagena, and fled the city on board the Libertad. The fleet were denied permission to anchor in Oran by French authorities, which directed them to Bizerte in the French protectorate of Tunisia.

The 4th Division of the Republican Army, led by the communist officer Joaquín Rodríguez, was dispatched to Cartagena by the communist commissar-general of the army Jesús Hernández in order to crush the revolt. On 5 March, the 206th Brigade entered Cartagena and successfully began to retake the city from the rebels, including the radio station and the coastal batteries. There were 61 deaths, including Gerardo Armentia, the leader of the fifth column. By 7 March, the uprising had been defeated, and the Republicans had regained control of Cartagena.

== Aftermath ==
Francisco Franco ordered Nationalist troops to Cartagena to support the uprising, though he was unaware Republican loyalists had since entered the city and were defeating the rebels. These troops were sent in a convoy of 16 small and medium-sized ships from Castellón and Málaga. Shortly after their arrival, they discovered the Republicans had regained control and retreated to a distance away from the city. The landing was cancelled and the ships were ordered to return to port, but two of the transport ships came under fire from a Republican-controlled battery. The SS Castillo de Olite, which had a broken radio, continued to enter into Cartagena and mistook the battery firing for the rebels celebrating their arrival. The Castillo de Olite was sunk when it was hit by a single shell and split in two, killing 1,476 soldiers and 700 being taken prisoner. The Castillo Peñafiel was also hit but managed to port in Ibiza under its own power.

The Republicans were able to suppress the uprising and restore their control of Cartagena, but the loss of the fleet was a catastrophe as the evacuation of potentially thousands of pro-Republican refugees was now impossible. Cartagena would later be taken by the Nationalists on 31 March.

== See also ==
- List of Spanish Republican military equipment of the Spanish Civil War
- List of Spanish Nationalist military equipment of the Spanish Civil War
