= Churruca-class destroyer (1927) =

Destroyer class of the Spanish Navy

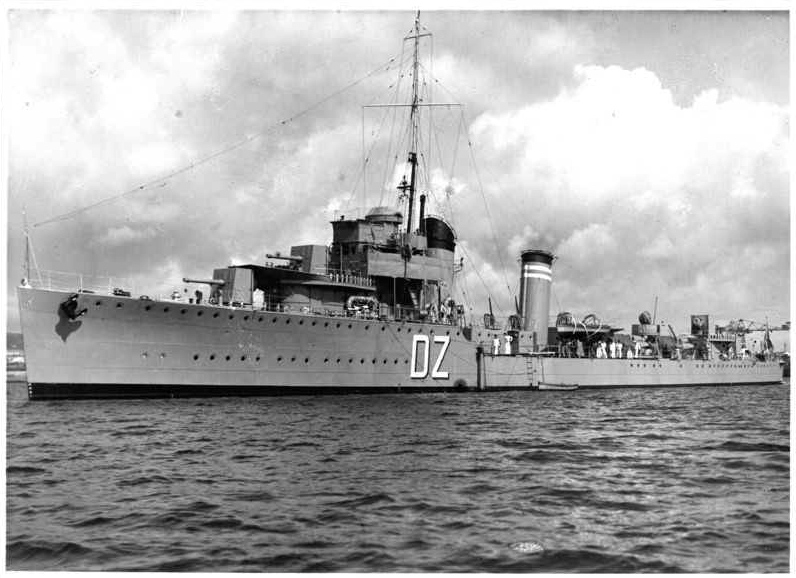
- Destroyer José Luis Diez

Class overview
- Name: Churruca class
- Builders: SECN, Naval Dockyard, Cartagena.
- Operators: Spanish Navy; Argentine Navy
- Preceded by: (Spain) Alsedo class; (Argentina) Catamarca class; (Argentina) La Plata class
- Succeeded by: (Spain) Audaz class; (Argentina) Mendoza class
- Subclasses: Cervantes class; Alava class
- Built: 1923–1951
- In commission: 1927–1982
- Completed: 18
- Lost: 2
- Retired: 16

General characteristics
- Type: Destroyer
- Displacement: 1,560–1,676 t (1,535–1,650 long tons) (standard); 2,120–2,205 t (2,087–2,170 long tons) (full load)
- Length: 101.50 m (333 ft 0 in) oa
- Beam: 9.68 m (31 ft 9 in)
- Draught: 3.20 m (10 ft 6 in)
- Installed power: 4 Yarrow boilers; 42,000 hp (31,000 kW)
- Propulsion: 2 Parsons turbines
- Speed: 36 knots (67 km/h)
- Range: 4,500 nmi (8,300 km) at 14 knots (26 km/h)
- Complement: 175
- Armament: 5 × 120 mm (4.7 in) L45 guns in single mounts; 1 × 76 mm (3 in) anti-aircraft gun; 4 × machineguns; 6 × 533 mm (21 in) torpedo tubes in two triple mounts; 2 × depth charge throwers

The Churruca class was a Spanish destroyer class built for the Spanish Navy based on a British design. Eighteen ships were built, with two being sold to Argentina and commonly referred to as the Cervantes class. The last two members of the class are sometimes referred to as a separate class, the Alava class.

The ships were authorized on 17 February 1915 by Navy Minister Augusto Miranda y Godoy. The program planned for four light cruisers, six destroyers, 28 submarines, three gunboats, and 18 coast guard vessels; of these, five light cruisers, three Alsedo and fourteen Churruca-class destroyers, 16 submarines, and the three gunboats were actually completed. The class was built in three groups, with the first group beginning construction in 1923 and the final group's construction delayed by the Spanish Civil War and World War II which led to their completion only in 1957. Some of the later ships of the class were completed without the central gun due to an arms embargo during the Spanish Civil War.

The Churruca class took part in the Spanish Civil War as part of the Spanish Republican Navy, with one being lost in battle. Following the end of the civil war, the destroyers were integrated into the navy of Francoist Spain. They continued in service until the 1950s–1960s when they were discarded. The two completed after World War II remained in service until the early 1980s.

== Design ==
The Churruca class came in three groups. Initially, the first three ships were intended to be repeats of the previous Alsedo class. However, a financial delay prevented this once the project was refinanced the first group was based on the British Admiralty type flotilla leader (Scott class) design. The destroyers had a standard displacement of 1,560 tonnes (1,535 long tons) and were 2,120 tonnes (2,087 long tons) at full load. They were 101.50 metres (333 ft 0 in) long overall and 97.52 metres (319 ft 11 in) between perpendiculars with a beam of 9.68 metres (31 ft 9 in) and a mean draught of 3.20 metres (10 ft 6 in).

The Churruca class were propelled by two shafts driven by Parsons geared turbines powered by steam provided by four Yarrow boilers. The engines were rated at 42,000 shaft horsepower (31,319 kW) and the destroyers had a maximum speed of 36 knots (67 km/h; 41 mph). The Churruca class had 508 tonnes (500 long tons) capacity for fuel oil. The destroyers had a complement of 175 officers and ratings.

The class was armed with five 120-millimetre (4.7 in) L45 guns in single mounts. They had one 76 mm (3 in) gun for anti-aircraft defence and four machine guns. They were also equipped with six 533 mm (21 in) torpedo tubes in two triple mounts and two depth charge throwers.

The second group differed only slightly from the first. Their displacement was greater, at 1,543 tonnes (1,519 long tons) standard and 2,209 tonnes (2,174 long tons) at full load and they had greater bunkerage for the fuel oil, with capacity for 548 tonnes (539 long tons), which gave them a range of 4,500 nautical miles (8,300 km; 5,200 mi) at 14 knots (26 km/h; 16 mph). The third group differed greatly, as their construction had been delayed and newer systems were added. Their displacement was increased again, at 1,676 tonnes (1,650 long tons) standard and 2,205 tonnes (2,170 long tons) at full load. They retained the increased fuel capacity and range of the second group while having different armament. They were equipped with four 120 mm guns and but had six 37 mm (1.46 in) in three twin mounts and three 20 mm (0.79 in) cannon for anti-aircraft defence.

In the early 1940s, all the surviving Spanish ships were modified and had one of the 120 mm guns landed and were given two twin-mounted 37 mm guns and four 20 mm cannon for improved anti-air defence. They retained their torpedo tubes, but the number of depth charge throwers was increased to four. In later years, some of the 37 mm and 20 mm guns were removed. The third group, or Alava class, underwent modernisation in the early 1960s. Their forecastle was lengthened by 8.0 metres (26 ft 3 in) and the displacement increased to 1,842 tonnes (1,813 long tons) standard and 2,287 tonnes (2,251 long tons) at full load. The engines were rerated at 31,500 shp (23,490 kW) and the ships had a maximum speed of 29 knots (54 km/h; 33 mph), with fuel oil capacity of 370 tonnes (364 long tons). Their armament was completely made over, with three single 76 mm/50 calibre guns, three 40 mm/70 calibre SP48 anti-aircraft guns, two side-launching racks for six anti-submarine (ASW) torpedoes, two Hedgehog ASW mortars, eight depth charge throwers and two depth charge racks. A lattice mast was added and caps were placed on the funnels and they were given MLA-1B air search radar, SG-6B surface search radar, Decca TM-626 navigational radar and two Mk 63 fire control radar sets. For ASW, the two ships were equipped with SQS-30A hull-mounted sonar.

In Argentine Navy service, the two vessels that became known as the Cervantes class had their midships 120 mm gun replaced with two twin 40 mm (2 in) guns with the 76 mm gun later being replaced with a further twin 40 mm mount. Two of the twin mounts were located between the funnels and one after of the funnels.

== Ships in class ==
Churruca-class destroyers
Name	Builder	Launched	Commissioned	Fate	Notes
1st group
Churruca	Cádiz (Note: Whitley has La Carraca, Cartagena as the builder, while Chesneau has Cádiz.)	26 June 1925	3 September 1927	Decommissioned 1961	Sold to Argentina 1927, renamed ARA Cervantes.
Alcalá Galiano	La Carraca, Cartagena	2 November 1925	3 September 1927	Decommissioned 1960	Sold to Argentina 1927, renamed ARA Juan de Garay.
Sánchez Barcáiztegui	S.E.C.N. Cartagena	24 July 1926	1929	Stricken 1960s	
José Luis Díez	S.E.C.N. Cartagena	25 August 1928	1930	Stricken 1960s	
Almirante Ferrándiz	S.E.C.N. Cartagena	21 May 1928	1930	Sunk in action on 29 September 1936 by the cruiser Canarias	
Lepanto	S.E.C.N. Cartagena	7 November 1929	1931	Stricken August 1957	
Churruca	S.E.C.N. Cartagena	June 1929	1932	Stricken 1960s	
Alcalá Galiano	S.E.C.N. Cartagena	12 April 1930	1932	Stricken 1957	
Almirante Valdes	S.E.C.N. Cartagena	8 September 1930	1932	Stricken 1957	
2nd group
Almirante Antequera	S.E.C.N. Cartagena	29 December 1930	July 1936	Stricken 1960s	
Almirante Miranda	S.E.C.N. Cartagena	20 June 1931	July 1930	Stricken 2 March 1970	
Císcar	S.E.C.N. Cartagena	26 October 1933	1937	Ran aground 17 October 1957	
Escaño	S.E.C.N. Cartagena	28 June 1932	September 1936	Stricken 1960s	
Gravina	S.E.C.N. Cartagena	24 December 1931	September 1936	Stricken 1960s	
Jorge Juan	S.E.C.N. Cartagena	28 March 1933	1937	Stricken 1959	
Ulloa	S.E.C.N. Cartagena	24 July 1933	1937	Stricken 1960s	
3rd group
Alava	Bazán, Cartagena	19 June 1947	21 December 1950	Stricken 2 November 1978	
Liniers	Bazán, Cartagena	1 May 1946	27 January 1957	Stricken 1982	

== History ==
In 1915, the Spanish government authorised an extensive building programme by the Spanish Navy. The first three ships of the Churruca class were intended to be members of the Alsedo class which was based on the British M class but and were planned for construction during World War I. However, due to financial constraints, their construction was put off and when financing was approved for the new destroyers in 1922, a newer design was chosen. The first Churruca and Alcalá Galiano were sold to Argentina, and were replaced by two new destroyers bearing the same name. The class was considered successful, which led the Spanish government ordering a second group. Two vessels of the last group's construction became delayed by the Spanish Civil War and World War II, that they eventually became a third group. The first Churrucas began entering service with the Spanish Navy in 1929.

=== Spanish service ===
On the eve of the rebellion in the Spanish protectorate in Morocco, the active Churruca-class destroyers were ordered into the Gibraltar Strait to prevent any rebels from crossing to Spain. Churruca sailed to Ceuta where the destroyer joined the Nationalists. Churucca then transported Nationalist troops to Cádiz on 19 July 1936. However, the crew arrested the officers and rejoined the Spanish Republican Navy. Almirante Ferrándiz and Gravina took part in the Battle of Cape Espartel, where Almirante Ferrándiz was sunk by the Nationalist cruiser Canarias. Lepanto, Almirante Valdes, Almirante Antequera, Gravina, Jorge Juan, and Escaño participated in the Battle of Cape Cherchell. Lepanto, Sánchez Barcaiztegui, Almirante Miranda and Grafina were engaged in the Battle of Cape Palos, where Lepanto sank the Nationalist cruiser Baleares with torpedoes. Ciscar was sunk by aircraft in Gijón harbour, refloated by the rebels, and used by them in the final phases of the war.

Sánchez Barcaiztegui was bombed and sunk in shallow water at Cartagena in March 1939, but later raised and returned to service following the war. José Luis Díez was severely damaged in an encounter with Canarias and was beached in Catalan Bay. The ship was raised and towed to Gibraltar where the vessel was interned until the end of the war. When the Spanish Civil War ended, the class was turned over to the Nationalists. Spain remained neutral during World War II Ciscar ran aground in fog off Ferrol in October 1957. Salvage of the ship was abandoned in 1958 and the vessel was stricken.

Construction of what became the third group was delayed due to the Spanish Civil War and began again in 1939. However, construction was stopped in 1940 due to World War II. They were finished only after the war. The remaining ships of the first and second groups underwent modernisation in the 1950s and further updates were planned but later cancelled in the 1960s. The third group were modernised in the early 1960s and rerated as "fast frigates". Liniers was used for midshipman training at the Naval Academy until 1982. Liniers, the last of the class, was stricken in 1982.

=== Argentinian Navy service ===
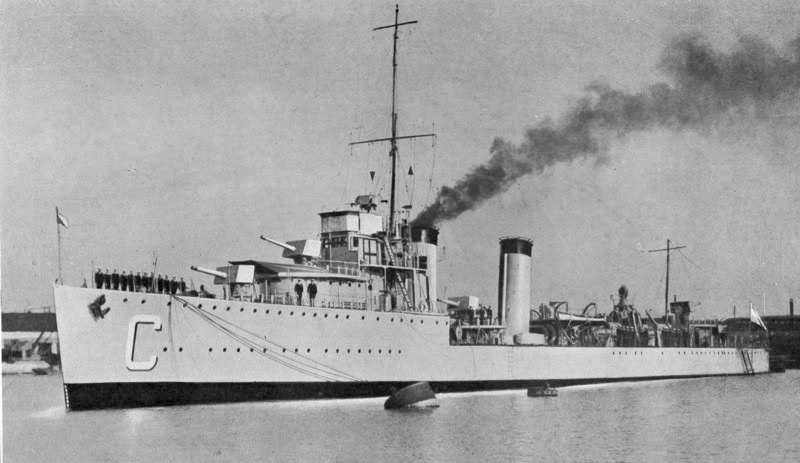
The initial Churruca (1925), sold to Argentina in 1927 and renamed ARA Cervantes

Churruca and Alcalá Galiano were sold to the Argentine Navy while under construction on 10 June 1926. They were renamed ARA Cervantes (E1) and ARA Juan de Garay (E2) respectively. Cervantes reached 39.76 knots (73.64 km/h; 45.75 mph) while on sea trials. The ships were commissioned on 3 September 1927 and modernised after World War II. In 1952, the two vessels were reclassified as destroyer escorts (torpederos).

Cervantes was severely damaged by Gloster Meteor fighters loyal to Juan Domingo Perón while evacuating personnel from the rebel naval base of Río Santiago during the 1955 Revolución Libertadora. She was placed in reserve in May 1961. Juan de Garay was used as a training vessel from 1952 to 1959. Cervantes was stricken on 24 June 1961 and Juan de Garay on 25 March 1960.

== Sources ==
- Chesneau, Roger, ed. (1980). Conway's All the World's Fighting Ships 1922–1946. Greenwich, UK: Conway Maritime Press. ISBN 0-85177-146-7.
- Flórez, Dionisio García (2002). Buques de la Guerra Civil Española. Destructores (in Spanish). Madrid: Almena. ISBN 84-932284-7-8.
- Gardiner, Robert; Chumbley, Stephen & Budzbon, Przemysław, eds. (1995). Conway's All the World's Fighting Ships 1947–1995. Annapolis, Maryland: Naval Institute Press. ISBN 1-55750-132-7.
- Whitley, M. J. (2000) [1988]. Destroyers of World War Two: An International Encyclopedia. Annapolis, Maryland: Naval Institute Press. ISBN 0-87021-326-1.
