= Hispano-Suiza E-30 =

E-30
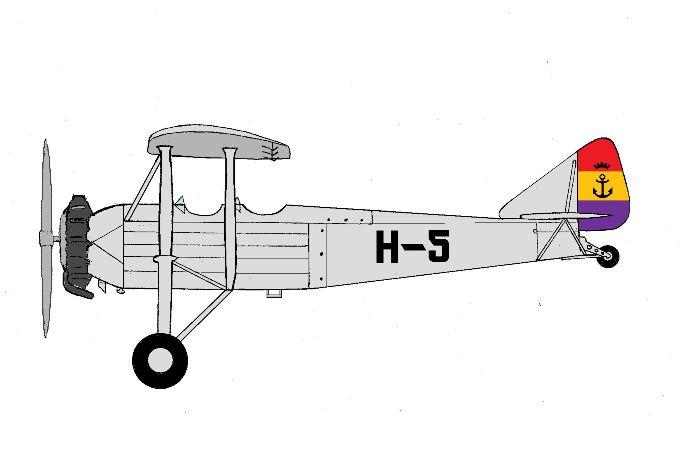
- Hispano Suiza E-30 of the Aeronáutica Naval

General information
- Type: Tandem seat trainer
- National origin: Spain
- Manufacturer: Hispano-Suiza
- Designer: André Bédoiseau
- Primary users: Aeronáutica Militar Aeronáutica Naval
- Number built: c.28

History
- Manufactured: 1931-1935
- Introduction date: 1932
- First flight: 1930

The Hispano Suiza E-30, later renamed Hispano E-30, was designed in Spain in 1930 as a multi-purpose intermediate trainer. It was a single engine, parasol wing monoplane. About 25 served with the Spanish armed forces until 1945.

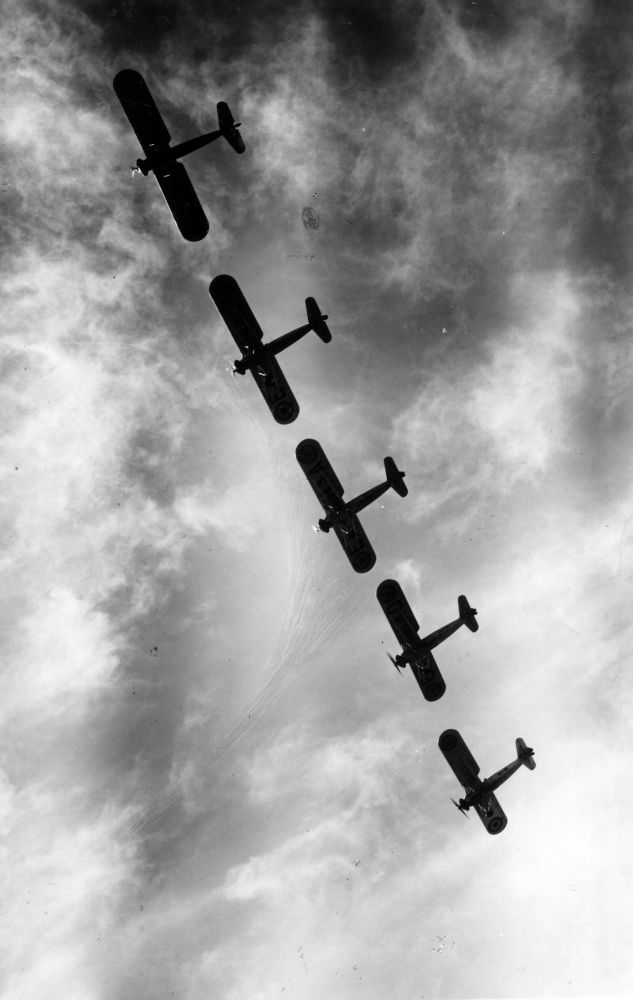
Hispano E-30s of Aeronáutica Naval in formation

== Design and development ==
Before 1930, Hispano-Suiza had built aircraft designed elsewhere and from 1928 had produced metal framed Nieuport-Delage 52 fighters for the Aviación Militar. This contract encouraged them to design an intermediate military trainer to prepare Spanish pilots for the Nieuport and also to provide advanced training for blind flying, gunnery, bombing, photo-reconnaissance and wireless operation. It was also to be suitable for liaison duties. The resulting aircraft was called the E-30, where E stood for Escuela (in English, training) and the 30 was from the design year of 1930. It was a single engine, parasol wing monoplane, seating two in tandem.

The wing of the E-30 was straight edged and of constant chord, with rounded wing tips and a large, rounded cut-out in the trailing edge above the fuselage to improve visibility from the rear cockpit. It was fabric covered over a wooden structure, with Spanish pine box spars and ribs. Its centre section contained an integral fuel tank and was mounted on the fuselage with three duraluminum cabane struts on each side to the fuselage top and sides. Each wing was braced with a pair of lift struts from the fuselage bottom to about mid-span. The wings could be easily folded.

The fuselage was in three sections. Behind the engine compartment there was a simple duraluminum section containing the open, tandem cockpits, the forward one being below mid-chord. The rear fuselage was a fabric covered tube steel structure, with the wood and fabric in-flight adjustable strut braced tailplane mounted on top. The fin, of similar construction, was broad and round edged, carrying the rudder which extended between the elevators to the fuselage bottom. Production machines had a new, triangular fin. The undercarriage was fixed and wide track (2.60 m or 8 ft 6 in), with near vertical main legs mounted on the forward lift struts. The tops of the legs were further braced to the upper fuselage. Split axles were fixed at the bottoms of the forward lift struts; single wheels were fitted with balloon tyres and had differential brakes for ground steering. The first prototype had a steerable tailskid, replaced by a tailwheel in later aircraft.

The first prototype, which first flew in 1930 and was designated E-30 H, was powered by an upright V-8 180 hp (134 kW) Hispano-Suiza 8Ab engine. It had a maximum speed of 180 km/h (112 mph) and a takeoff weight of 1,150 kg (2535 lb). A second prototype flew the following year, powered by a 220 hp (164 kW) Hispano-Wright 9Qa, an early licence-built version of the 9-cylinder radial Wright Whirlwind. The third prototype had a modified wing fitted with flaps and Handley Page slots for low speed flight. Production aircraft used a slightly developed version of this radial, the 250 hp (186 kW) Hispano-Wright 9 Qd.

The E-30 could be armed, according to its training rôle. Possibilities included a fixed, forward firing 7.7 mm (0.303 in) Vickers machine gun or a similar gun in the rear cockpit. Up to six 12 kg (23 lb) bombs could be attached to under fuselage and fuselage side racks.

== Operational history ==
The Aeronáutica Militar purchased ten E-30s in 1932-3 and another five in 1935. The Aeronáutica Naval ordered seven between 1933-4, though they were later reported as having eight. The Aeronáutica Militar aircraft had their radial engines cowled with Townend rings and driving a metal propeller; their wings carried Hadley Page slots. the Naval machines had uncowled engines, wooden propellers and folding wings.

E-30s were involved in the Spanish Civil War, all but one initially were part of the Spanish Republican Air Force. At first the Republican aircraft were used for bombing and reconnaissance but reverted to the training rôle as more suitable front line aircraft became available. As the war ended, thirteen were captured by the Nationalists, serving briefly with the Aviación Nacional and then, in 1939, with the newly formed Ejercito del Aire until 1945. One remained with the Acedemia de Aviación at León in 1950.

Since 1945 Spanish military air force aircraft have had designations describing their rôle. Under this system the E-30 became first the EE.2, as a basic trainer then the E.2 trainer.

== Variants ==
Data from Lage

E-30 H
1st prototype, powered by an upright V-8 180 hp (134 kW) Hispano-Suiza 8Ab engine.

E30
2nd prototype and production aircraft, powered by a 9-cylinder Hispano-Wright 9Qa radial engine.

E-303
Proposed combat version, heavily modified, armed and with a 1,000 hp (745 kW) Hispano-Suiza 14AA twin row radial. Not built.

== Operators ==
Data from Lage

Spain

- Aeronáutica Militar - 18 aircraft
- Spanish Republican Navy
  - Aeronáutica Naval - 7 or 8 aircraft
- Spanish Republican Air Force

Spain (Spanish State)

- Spanish Air Force

== Specifications (E-30, production version) ==
Data from Lage, Aviones Militares Españoles

General characteristics

- Crew: 2
- Length: 7.95 m (26 ft 1 in)
- Wingspan: 12.0 m (39 ft 4 in)
- Height: 3.53 m (11 ft 7 in)
- Wing area: 22.47 m^{2} (241.9 sq ft)
- Empty weight: 916 kg (2,019 lb)
- Gross weight: 1,350 kg (2,976 lb)
- Powerplant: 1 × Hispano-Wright 9 Qd 9-cylinder air-cooled radial piston, 190 kW (250 hp)
- Propellers: 2-bladed wooden fixed pitch propeller

Performance

- Maximum speed: 225 km/h (140 mph, 121 kn)
- Stall speed: 90 km/h (56 mph, 49 kn)
- Service ceiling: 6,500 m (21,300 ft) practical
- Time to altitude: 5,200 m (17,000 ft) in 24 minutes

== See also ==
Related lists

- List of Interwar military aircraft
- List of aircraft of the Spanish Republican Air Force
