= Spanish B-class submarine =

Spanish Navy submarine class

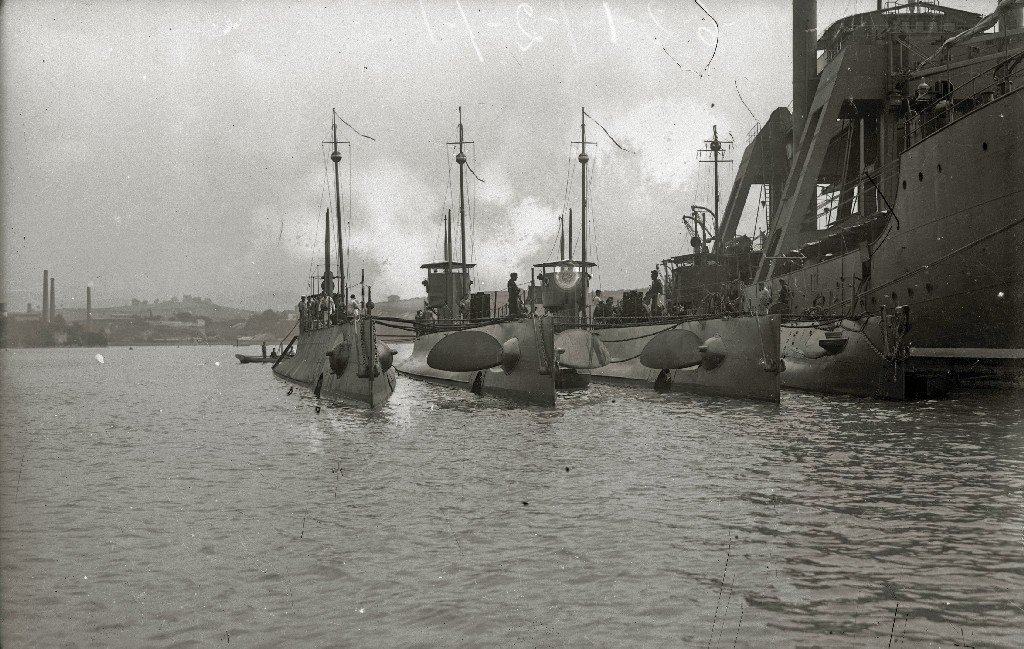
- B-class submarines alongside the submarine rescue ship Kanguro in Pasaia Bay in 1922.

Class overview
- Name: C class
- Builders: SECN, Cartagena, Spain
- Operators: Spanish Navy (1922–1931, 1939–1951); Spanish Republican Navy (1931–1939)
- Preceded by: A class
- Succeeded by: C class
- Built: 1917–1926
- In commission: 1922–1951
- Completed: 6
- Lost: 3

General characteristics (per Conway's 1906–1921)
- Class & type: B-class submarine
- Displacement: 491 long tons (499 t) surfaced; 715 long tons (726 t) submerged
- Length: 62.5 m (205 ft) pp; 64.1 m (210 ft 4 in) oa
- Beam: 5.6 m (17 ft 4 in)
- Draft: 3.4 m (11 ft 3 in)
- Installed power: 1,400 bhp (1,044 kW) diesel; 850 hp (634 kW) electric
- Propulsion: 2 × NELSECO diesel engines; 2 × electric motors; 2 × screws
- Speed: 16 knots (30 km/h; 18 mph) surfaced; 10 knots (19 km/h; 12 mph) submerged
- Range: 8,000 nmi (15,000 km; 9,200 mi) at 10.5 knots (19.4 km/h; 12.1 mph) surfaced; 125 nmi (232 km; 144 mi) at 4.5 knots (8.3 km/h; 5.2 mph) submerged
- Complement: 28
- Armament: 4 × 457 mm (18 in) torpedo tubes (2 bow, 2 stern); 1 × 3 in (76 mm) deck gun

General characteristics (per Todoavante))
- Class & type: B-class submarine
- Displacement: 564 long tons (573 t) surfaced; 716 long tons (727 t) submerged
- Length: 64.18 m (210 ft 7 in)
- Beam: 5.6 m (18 ft 4 in)
- Draft: 3.44 m (11 ft 3 in) (mean)
- Depth: 5.1 m (16 ft 9 in)
- Installed power: 1,400 bhp (1,044 kW) diesel; 420 hp (313 kW) electric
- Propulsion: 2 × 700 hp (522 kW) diesel engines; 2 × 210 hp (157 kW) electric motors; 2 × screws
- Speed: 16.22 knots (30.04 km/h; 18.67 mph) surfaced; 10.5 knots (19.4 km/h; 12.1 mph) submerged
- Range: 2,600 nmi (3,000 mi; 4,800 km) at 16 knots (30 km/h; 18 mph) surfaced; 4,900 nmi (5,600 mi; 9,100 km) at 10.5 knots (19.4 km/h; 12.1 mph) surfaced; 10 nmi (12 mi; 19 km) at 10.5 knots (19.4 km/h; 12.1 mph) submerged; 90 nmi (100 mi; 170 km) at 4.5 knots (8.3 km/h; 5.2 mph) submerged
- Test depth: 60 m (197 ft)
- Complement: As built: 28; From 1934: 34
- Armament: 4 × 450 mm (17.7 in) torpedo tubes (2 bow, 2 stern); 8 × Whitehead X-150 torpedoes; 1 × 76 mm (3 in) antiaircraft gun

The B-class submarines were a class of six submarines built for the Spanish Navy between 1917 and 1926, the first submarines built in Spain during the 20th century. They entered service between 1922 and 1926. All six served in the Spanish Republican Navy in the Spanish Civil War (1936–1939), during which two were lost. Francoist Spain took control of the survivors after the war, but none saw postwar operational service.

== Description ==
The Sociedad Española de Construcción Naval (SECN) built the B-class submarines to a Holland design under license from the Electric Boat Company between 1917 and 1926. One source describes their design as the Holland F105 design, a derivative of the successful Holland 903-L series, while another describes their design as the Holland F17 design. They were an enlarged and improved version of the Spanish submarine Isaac Peral (A-0). Originally, the Spanish Navy planned to name them A-4 through A-9.

Sources disagree on the dimensions of the B-class submarines. One source states that they were 64.1 metres (210 ft 4 in) long overall and 62.5 metres (205 ft) long between perpendiculars, with a beam of 5.6 metres (18 ft 4 in), and a draft of 3.4 metres (11 ft 2 in),, while another cites their length as 64.18 metres (210 ft 7 in), their beam as 5.6 metres (18 ft 4 in), and their draft as 3.44 metres (11 ft 3 in). Sources describe their displacement differently, one claiming it was 491 long tons (499 t) on the surface and 715 long tons (726 t) submerged while another asserts that it was 564 long tons (573 t) on the surface and 716 long tons (727 t) submerged.

Two New London Ship and Engine Company (NELSECO) 700 bhp (522 kW) diesel engines driving two screws gave the B-class submarines a top speed on the surface of 16 knots (30 km/h; 18 mph) or 16.22 knots (30.04 km/h; 18.67 mph), according to different sources. Their two 210 hp (157 kW) or 425 hp (317 kW) electric motors (according to different sources) gave them a maximum submerged speed of either 10 knots (18.5 km/h; 11.5 mph). or 10.5 knots (19.4 km/h; 12.1 mph), also according to different sources. One source states that on the surface the submarines had a range of 2,600 nmi (3,000 mi; 4,800 km) at 16 knots (30 km/h; 18 mph) and 4,900 nmi (5,600 mi; 9,100 km) at 10.5 knots (19.4 km/h; 12.1 mph), while according to another their surface range was 8,000 nmi (9,200 mi; 15,000 km) at 10.5 knots (19.4 km/h; 12.1 mph). Submerged, their range was 10 nmi (12 mi; 19 km) at 10.5 knots (19.4 km/h; 12.1 mph) and 90 nmi (100 mi; 170 km) at 4.5 knots (8.3 km/h; 5.2 mph) according to once source, or 125 nmi (144 mi; 232 km) at 4.5 knots (8.3 km/h; 5.2 mph) according to another.

Each B-class submarine had four torpedo tubes — two in the bow and two in the stern — and carried eight Whitehead torpedoes. One source states that they had 450 mm (17.7 in) torpedo tubes, another that they had 457 mm (18 in) torpedo tubes. They also had a 76 mm (3 in) deck gun.

When commissioned, the B-class submarines had a crew of 28. By order of the Ministry of the Navy on 15 August 1934, their crew size increased to 34. They had a diving depth of 60 metres (197 feet).

== Service ==
The B-class submarines entered service in the Spanish Navy between 1922 and 1926. They served under the Kingdom of Spain until 1931, with the first two seeing action in the Rif War in 1922. From 1931 they served under the Second Spanish Republic in the Spanish Republican Navy.

The Spanish Civil War broke out on 17 July 1936, and all six of the submarines remained under the control of the Republican faction during the conflict. B-6 was lost in action with Nationalist warships in 1936, and B-3 sustained serious damage in a collision that year and was decommissioned. B-5 disappeared during a patrol in 1937. Francoist Spain took control of B-1, B-2, B-3, and B-4 at the end of the war in 1939. Only B-1 and B-2 were ever in commission in the postwar Spanish Navy; and apparently none ever were seaworthy again after the war. All of the surviving B-class submarines were disposed of during the 1940s except B-2, which survived until 1951.

== Submarines of the class ==
The six submarines of the B class were:

| Ship name | Builder | Laid down | Launched | Commissioned | Decommissioned | Fate |
|---|---|---|---|---|---|---|
| B-1 | SECN, Cartagena, Spain | 1 February 1917 | 2 June 1921 | 11 January 1922 | 21 October 1941 | Sunk as target 1949 |
| B-2 | SECN, Cartagena, Spain | 24 August 1917 | 10 October 1921 | 1 June 1922 | 5 April 1951 | Hulked June 1940; Sank under tow 28 November 1951 |
| B-3 | SECN, Cartagena, Spain | 21 January 1920 | 17 March 1922 | 24 August 1922 | 8 June 1940 | Scrapped 1940 |
| B-4 | SECN, Cartagena, Spain | 9 May 1920 | 31 October 1922 | 28 May 1923 | 31 July 1941 | Scrapped |
| B-5 | SECN, Cartagena, Spain | 13 January 1921 | 4 April 1925 | 31 December 1925 | —N/a | Missing mid-October 1936 |
| B-6 | SECN, Cartagena, Spain | 5 September 1921 | 13 January 1923 | 21 January 1926 | —N/a | Sunk 19 September 1936 |

== See also ==
- List of historic Spanish Navy ships
- List of submarines of the Spanish Navy
