= Spanish submarine B-5 =

Spanish Navy submarine of 1925–1936

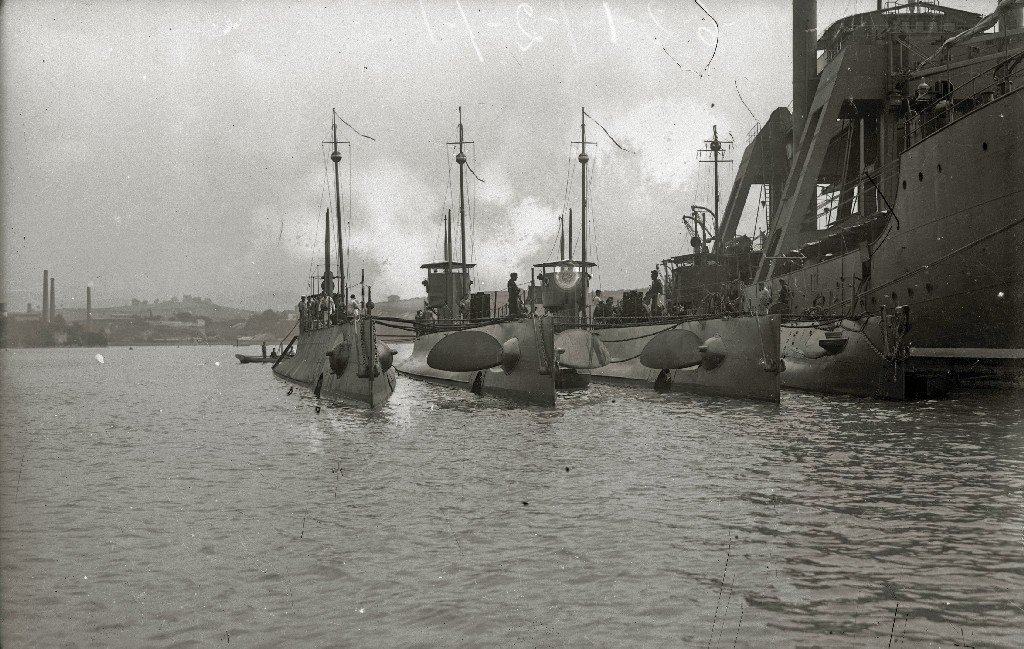
- B-class submarines alongside the submarine rescue ship Kanguro in Pasaia Bay in 1922.

History

Spain
- Name: B-5
- Builder: SECN, Cartagena, Spain
- Laid down: 13 January 1921
- Launched: 4 April 1925
- Commissioned: 31 December 1925
- Identification: Pennant number B-5
- Fate: Missing mid-October 1936

General characteristics (per Conway's 1906–1921)
- Class & type: B-class submarine
- Displacement: 491 long tons (499 t) surfaced; 715 long tons (726 t) submerged
- Length: 62.5 m (205 ft) pp; 64.1 m (210 ft 4 in) oa
- Beam: 5.6 m (17 ft 4 in)
- Draft: 3.4 m (11 ft 3 in)
- Installed power: 1,400 bhp (1,044 kW) diesel; 850 hp (634 kW) electric
- Propulsion: 2 × NELSECO diesel engines; 2 × electric motors; 2 × screws
- Speed: 16 knots (30 km/h; 18 mph) surfaced; 10 knots (19 km/h; 12 mph) submerged
- Range: 8,000 nmi (15,000 km; 9,200 mi) at 10.5 knots (19.4 km/h; 12.1 mph) surfaced; 125 nmi (232 km; 144 mi) at 4.5 knots (8.3 km/h; 5.2 mph) submerged
- Complement: 28
- Armament: 4 × 457 mm (18 in) torpedo tubes (2 bow, 2 stern); 1 × 3 in (76 mm) deck gun

General characteristics (per Todoavante))
- Class & type: B-class submarine
- Displacement: 564 long tons (573 t) surfaced; 716 long tons (727 t) submerged
- Length: 64.18 m (210 ft 7 in)
- Beam: 5.6 m (18 ft 4 in)
- Draft: 3.44 m (11 ft 3 in) (mean)
- Depth: 5.1 m (16 ft 9 in)
- Installed power: 1,400 bhp (1,044 kW) diesel; 420 hp (313 kW) electric
- Propulsion: 2 × 700 hp (522 kW) diesel engines; 2 × 210 hp (157 kW) electric motors; 2 × screws
- Speed: 16.22 knots (30.04 km/h; 18.67 mph) surfaced; 10.5 knots (19.4 km/h; 12.1 mph) submerged
- Range: 2,600 nmi (3,000 mi; 4,800 km) at 16 knots (30 km/h; 18 mph) surfaced; 4,900 nmi (5,600 mi; 9,100 km) at 10.5 knots (19.4 km/h; 12.1 mph) surfaced; 10 nmi (12 mi; 19 km) at 10.5 knots (19.4 km/h; 12.1 mph) submerged; 90 nmi (100 mi; 170 km) at 4.5 knots (8.3 km/h; 5.2 mph) submerged
- Test depth: 60 m (197 ft)
- Complement: As built: 28; From 1934: 34
- Armament: 4 × 450 mm (17.7 in) torpedo tubes (2 bow, 2 stern); 8 × Whitehead X-150 torpedoes; 1 × 76 mm (3 in) antiaircraft gun

B-5 was a Spanish Navy B-class submarine in commissioned in 1925. She served initially under the Kingdom of Spain, then was a unit of the Spanish Republican Navy under the Second Spanish Republic. She took part in the Spanish Civil War on the side of the Republican faction loyal to the government of the Second Spanish Republic. She was lost in 1936.

== Construction and commissioning ==
On 15 February 1915, the Spanish Cortes Generales passed the Miranda Law, a naval construction program which called for a Spanish Navy force that included 28 submarines. Shortages during World War I (1914–1918) and budgetary limitations led to delays in the program, and none of the B-class submarines entered service until the 1920s. The Sociedad Española de Construcción Naval (SECN) built all six of the submarines at Cartagena, Spain. Originally, the Spanish Navy planned to name them A-4 through A-9.

B-5 was the fifth submarine of the class. SECN laid her keel on 13 January 1921 and launched her on 4 April 1925. She was commissioned on 31 December 1925.

== Service history ==
=== Kingdom of Spain, 1925–1931 ===
In August and September 1928, B-5, her sister ships B-1, B-2, B-3, B-4, and B-6, and the submarines C-1 and C-2 carried out maneuvers in the Cantabrian Sea along the northern coast of Spain. In October and November 1928, all eight of the submarines conducted maneuvers in the Mediterranean Sea under the overall command of Capitán de navío (Ship-of-the-Line Captain) Mateo García de los Reyes, a future contralmirante (counter admiral) and minister of the navy. During the maneuvers, García de los Reyes's flagship, the troopship Almirante Lobo, arrived at Palma de Mallorca on Mallorca in the Balearic Islands at midnight on 2 November 1928, and the eight submarines, as well as the submarine Isaac Peral, subsequently anchored there as well. With Isaac Peral as its flagship, the submarine squadron called at Barcelona from 11 November until the morning of 20 November 1928 for a crew rest period.

In May 1929, all six B-class submarines as well as C-1, C-2, and their sister ship C-3 attended the 1929 Barcelona International Exposition, arriving in Barcelona a few days before the exposition officially opened on 19 May. They remained at Barcelona until the last week of May. B-5 took part in the annual squadron maneuvers in the Mediterranean Sea between mid-September and mid-October 1929, arriving in Barcelona in mid-October 1929 for a crew rest period. After stopping at Lisbon, Portugal, to refuel, B-2, B-3, B-4, and B-5 arrived at Vigo on the morning of 7 November 1929.

Luis Carrero Blanco was the commanding officer of B-5 from January 1930 to October 1931. He later rose to the rank of almirante (admiral) and went on to serve as Prime Minister of Spain from June to December 1973.

=== Second Spanish Republic, 1931–1936 ===
On 14 April 1931, the Second Spanish Republic was proclaimed, replacing the Kingdom of Spain. The Spanish Navy came under the republic's control as the Spanish Republican Navy. In January 1932, President of the Republic Niceto Alcalá Zamora visited Alicante aboard the destroyer Alcalá Galiano, and B-5 and B-6 accompanied him on the visit.

From June 1933 until 6 July 1933, B-5 participated in maneuvers along with B-6, C-2, C-3, the submarines C-4, C-5, and C-6, four light cruisers, nine destroyers, and several smaller and auxiliary vessels. B-5 also took part in the spring maneuvers of 1934 in the Mediterranean Sea, then participated in a naval review off Alcudia presided over by Zamora. An order of the Ministry of the Navy of 15 August 1934 mandated that the crew size of all six B-class submarines increase from 28 to 34 men.

In April and May 1936, B-5 was among several submarines that took part in maneuvers in the Canary Islands. After they concluded, B-5 returned to Cartagena and entered the shipyard there for repairs.

=== Spanish Civil War ===
On 17 July 1936, the Spanish Civil War began, with Nationalist forces under Francisco Franco opposing Republican forces which remained loyal to the Second Spanish Republic. At the time, B-5 was part of the submarine flotilla based at Cartagena, along with B-6 and all six C-class submarines. She still was under repair in the shipyard at Cartagena. Her executive officer, suspected of Nationalist sympathies, was arrested, and later was killed aboard the prison ship España No. 3 on 15 August 1936.

Meanwhile, upon completion of her repairs, B-5 got underway from Cartagena on 24 July 1936 bound for Málaga. From Málaga, she carried out patrols in the Strait of Gibraltar. During September and October 1936, B-5, C-2, and five destroyers patrolled the Strait of Gibraltar and in the Mediterranean Sea.

In mid-October 1936, B-5 departed Málaga and was never seen or heard from again, disappearing somewhere off Estepona with her entire crew of 37. The cause of her loss remains unknown. One hypothesis is that a Nationalist seaplane bombed and sank B-5 while she was on the surface sometime between 12 and 15 October 1936. B-5′s commanding officer was under surveillance by her ship's political committee for suspected Nationalist sympathies, and another possibility is that he committed an act of sabotage that resulted in her loss.
