= Spanish Republican Navy =

Naval Arm of Spanish Republic

- Marina de Guerra de la República Española
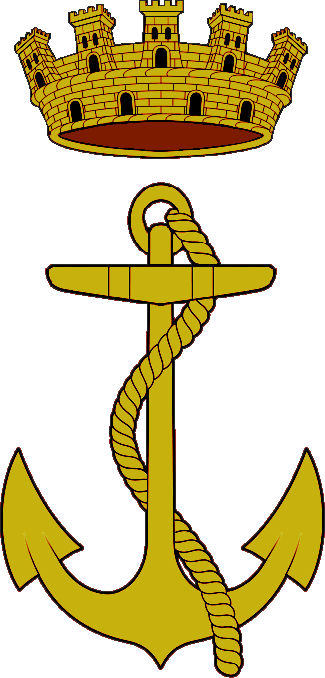
- Emblem of the Spanish Republican Navy
- Active: 1931–1939
- Country: Spanish Republic
- Branch: Spanish Republican Armed Forces
- Type: Navy
- Role: Maritime and coastal defence
- Engagements: Insurrection in Asturias Spanish Civil War

Commanders
- Notable commanders: Miguel Buiza Fdez.-Palacios, Luis González de Ubieta, Eduardo Armada Sabau, Tomás de Azcárate, Antonio Azarola y Gresillón, Camilo Molins Carreras, Fernando Barreto Palacios, Joaquín de Eguía y Unzueta, José García Barreiro, Diego de Marón Jordán, Fernando Navarro Capdevila, Luis Núñez de Castro Márquez, José Núñez Rodríguez, Manuel Núñez Rodríguez, Pedro Prado Mendizábal, José María Sánchez Ferragut, Juan Sandalio Sánchez Ferragut, Luis Sánchez Pinzón, Carlos Soto Romero

Insignia
- Naval ensign and Jack

- Rank flag of the Captain General of the Fleet

- Rank flag of the Admiral of the Fleet

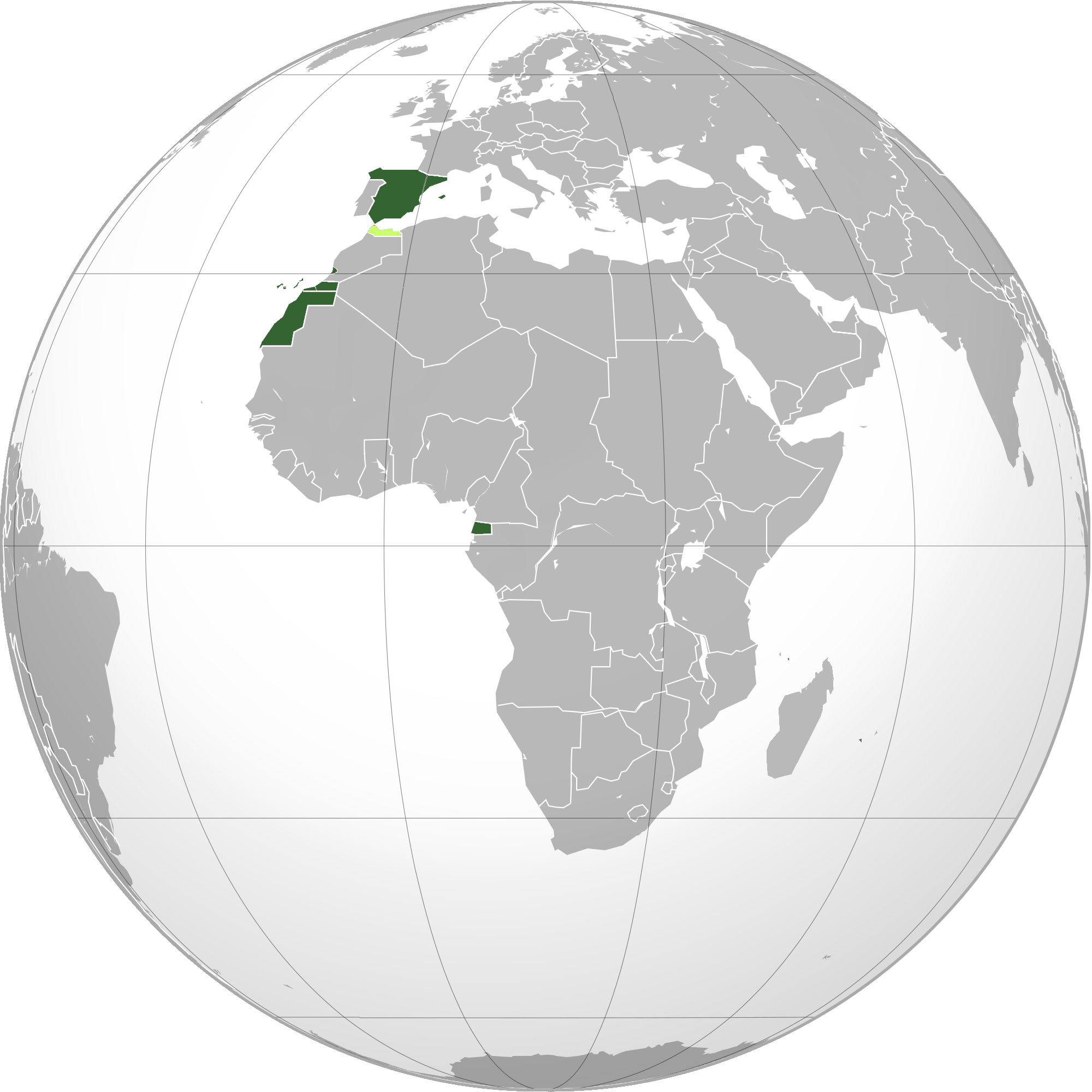
Spain and its colonies during the Spanish Republic (1931-1939)

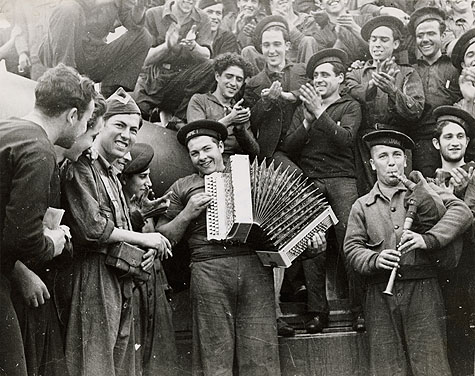
Republican sailors playing musical instruments on board battleship Jaime I, Almería, February 1937.

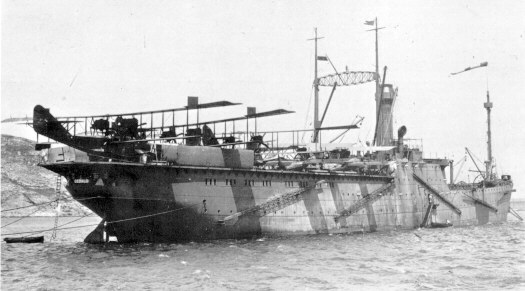
The seaplane carrier Dédalo

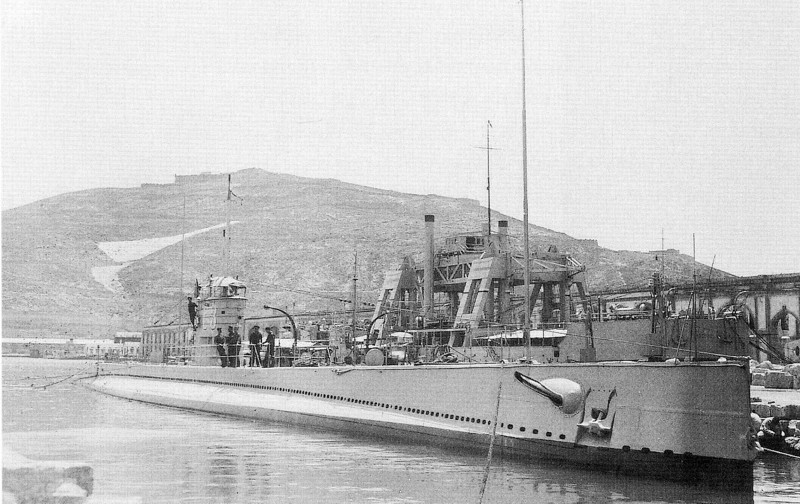
Submarine rescue ship Kanguro and submarine C-3 at Cartagena Naval Base before the submarine was sunk by German submarine U-34

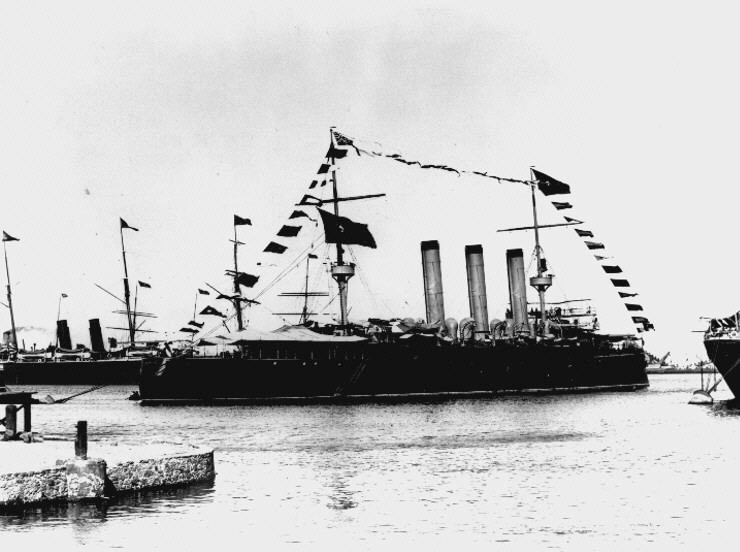
Cruiser Emperador Carlos V was no longer in active service during the Republic. It was used as a pontoon for exercises

The Spanish Republican Navy was the naval arm of the Armed Forces of the Second Spanish Republic, the legally established government of Spain between 1931 and 1939.

== History ==
In the same manner as the other two branches of the Spanish Republican Armed Forces, the Spanish Republican Navy went through two clear phases during its existence:

- The pre-Civil War phase, before the coup of July 1936 that would fracture the Spanish military institution
- The situation after the pro-fascist coup, when most of the fleet remained loyal to the republican government after the crews had overrun their officers and formed committees. Faced with the coup, many officers joined it and others hesitated; only about 5% of the top officers stood steadfastly for the Spanish Republic. The officer corps was later partially reinstated with the aim of improving coordination in the course of the Spanish Civil War.

=== First years of the Republic (1931–1936) ===
Spain had inherited a large navy from colonial times. A sizeable military fleet had been deemed necessary when the Spanish crown ruled over such far-flung places as the Philippines and Cuba, but by the early 1930s young military officers saw the institution as too large, old-fashioned and ineffective. They balked at the costs and at the lack of results of the Spanish military during the Rif Wars in Morocco and their vision was to have a smaller and more modern Spanish Navy that would meet the needs of the country. Ramón Franco, who was in the Air Force at the time of the proclamation of the Second Spanish Republic, said: "Our little colonies —referring to the small outposts in the Moroccan shores, the Western Sahara and Equatorial Guinea— don't need a strong navy made up of large and numerous units. The policing of our harbors, the implementing of fishery laws and the prevention of smuggling are nowadays the only missions that our Navy has to do."

Most top Navy officers, however, were comfortable with the old system, enjoying the perks and the prestige the Navy provided. Life in the high echelons of the Spanish Navy was more glamorous than among Army and Air Force officers, for it often included Yacht Club membership, with regattas, gala dinners and balls. They cast a dim eye on the reforms of the armed forces introduced by newly nominated Republican Minister of War Manuel Azaña within the first few months of the new government. Azaña's aim was to modernize the Spanish Military and cut down the expenses of the state in the aftermath of the Great Depression, but the naming of Santiago Casares Quiroga, a civilian without a Navy background, as Minister of the Navy was unwelcome by the traditional Spanish Navy officers who despised Casares Quiroga and privately mocked him.

In order to ingratiate itself with key officers in the Navy, the Republican Government promoted to high posts men such as Lieutenant Commander Ángel Rizo Bayona who was given the post of representing the state in the Trasmediterránea Shipping Company and Navy engineer Alfredo Cal Díaz who was promoted to the post of Navigation Director. But Azaña's lack of finesse in his dealings with the more conservative officers of the Spanish Navy established a deep mistrust between the majority of those having high posts in the Navy and the new government. Military reform measures were implemented already within the first month of the Republic, such as the repeal of the 1906 "Law of Jurisdictions" (Ley de Jurisdicciones) on 17 April, reform of the military rank rise system; reduction of the armed forces by scrapping ineffective units, reduction of the number of high military officers and the replacement of the War and Navy Military Tribunal (Consejo Supremo de Guerra y de Marina) whose functions were taken over by a Military department at the High Court, among other measures.

The Spanish Republic was proclaimed in the wake of the rise of Fascism in Europe and this ideology became very attractive for certain sectors of the Spanish military at the time. By 1935 the Unión Militar Española (UME), a secret military organization of pro-fascist officers of the Spanish Republican Armed Forces extended its influence among Spanish officers and began displaying open hostility towards the Spanish Republic. In order to oppose and neutralize this movement, Eugenio Rodríguez Sierra, an officer of the Spanish Republican Navy was instrumental in the foundation of the Military Antifascist Union Unión Militar Antifascista (UMA). The Unión Militar Antifascista was later merged with the Republican Military Union, Unión Militar Republicana (UMR), another clandestine group of similar goals that had been founded in 1929 within the Army, in order to create the Unión Militar Republicana Antifascista (UMRA). This organization would have a great influence among the ranks that were lower in command in the Spanish Republican Navy, opposing them to the conservative ideology of their top officers.

=== The Civil War (1936–1939) ===
The Spanish coup of July 1936 dealt a severe blow to the structure of the Spanish Republican Armed Forces, which ended up fragmented on the basis of joining the rebels or remaining loyal to the established government. The failure of the coup, especially in the main cities, Madrid, Barcelona, Bilbao and Valencia, along with the collapse of authority and the lack of agreement in the first brief negotiations, were only some of the factors that made the conflict drift towards open war. José Giral's government tried to put together a Volunteer Army based on the units that had remained loyal, but the urgency of the moment played in favor of the formation of popular militias that were armed by parties and trade unions.

The main naval bases of the Spanish Republican Navy were Ferrol (Northern Coast), Cádiz (Southern Coast) and Cartagena (Eastern Coast). The takeover of the Navy by coup leaders failed mainly because the messages calling for a rebellion against the Spanish Republic were not sent in code, as would have been the norm, from Ciudad Lineal to the senior officers commanding the ships. A young Navy radiotelegrapher, Benjamín Balboa, later took credit for the news leak.

As a result, most crews in naval ships were alerted and took over the command, overwhelming their officers. Thus, most of the ships of the Spanish Navy remained loyal to the republic, but many of the experienced top officers had been imprisoned and some were killed during the countermutinies, a fact that hampered the efficiency of the loyalist navy.

The rebellion, however, was successful in wide areas of Northern and Southern Spain and the important bases of Ferrol and Cádiz would fall into rebel hands. Warships that were in the dockyard, including heavy cruiser Canarias that was under construction at Ferrol, were seized and hastily put into use. Cádiz was taken for the rebels with the help of the first troops from the Army of Africa.

Despite the fact that the greater part of the Spanish coast was on the republican side and despite the great number of naval units belonging to the Spanish Republican Navy, there was a lack of effective action in the first, decisive weeks of the war. Some of the most experienced commanders, such as Francisco Bastarreche, Pedro Nieto Antúnez, Francisco Núñez Rodríguez, Gabriel Pita da Veiga y Sanz, Francisco Regalado Rodríguez, Manuel Vierna Belando and the brothers Francisco and Salvador Moreno Fernández, had defected to the rebels. In addition the crew committees (Comités de Buque) that had taken over the command of the ships were not able to deal with the high coordination that was required at the time. Later in 1936, Republican Defence Minister Indalecio Prieto terminated the Comités de Buque as part of his sweeping reorganization of the Republican Armed Forces.

The Third Reich and Italian Fascist military provided decisive support for General Franco's fraction of the army, so that the Spanish Republican Navy was unable to keep the blockade of the Strait of Gibraltar. Thus, on 5 August 1936, the so-called Convoy de la victoria was able to bring at least 2,500 men of the Army of Africa from Spanish Morocco to Peninsular Spain breaking the republican blockade. From August 6 rebel transport ships crossed the Strait of Gibraltar, with the cover of Italian bombers and republican Churruca-class destroyer Alcalá Galiano was attacked and hit by Fascist aircraft while steaming back to Málaga. Pro-Franco sources claim that she suffered 18 seamen killed and 28 wounded.

On August 7, the Jaime I and the cruiser Libertad shelled Algeciras and severely damaged rebel gunboat Eduardo Dato and armed trawler Uad Kert (ex-Castle-class naval trawler HMT Rother; ex-HMT Anthony Aslete) . Shortly thereafter a Nazi German Junkers Ju 52 struck the Republican battleship Jaime I and Italian bombers began to harass the Republican fleet so that it could not longer prevent the passage of transport ships. Furthermore, two German cruisers, Deutschland and Admiral Scheer patrolled the Strait on so-called non-intervention missions.

In addition, the United Kingdom authorities in Gibraltar and Tangier were openly hostile to the Spanish Republic. British oil companies at Gibraltar, refused to sell fuel to Republican ships and the Tangier International Commission denied the use of the harbor to the Spanish Republican Navy, claiming that "it was contrary to the city's neutrality". Nevertheless, the same British governing bodies authorized the passage of food, goods and gasoline for the Nazi German transport planes and their crews in Spanish Morocco. By the end of September, the Republic had lost the control of the waters between Morocco and the mainland.

Thenceforward the Republican Armada was forced to operate from its bases in Málaga and Cartagena without being allowed to use the harbor facilities at Gibraltar and Tangiers. Moreover, the Navy's Aeronáutica Naval planes were unable to hinder the massive airlift of troops from Spanish Morocco undertaken by the rebel side. This was the world's first long-range combat airlift and it was achieved using mostly Ju 52 planes provided by Hitler during the German re-armament phase. Following the Expedición al Mar Cantábrico, a naval operation that entered the Bay of Biscay in September and October 1936, the Republican Navy became mainly confined to the Mediterranean Sea, its operations in the Bay of Biscay were taken over by the Basque Auxiliary Navy. By late 1937, however, the whole northern coast was lost following the fall of Asturias and many ships were seized by the rebels, including destroyer Císcar, which after being refurbished was made part of the Nationalist Navy.

Following the defeat of the Spanish Republican fleet on 7 September 1937 at the Battle of Cape Cherchell, when a series of tactical errors on the part of the republican command allowed rebel cruiser Baleares to escape, Luis González de Ubieta became the Captain general of the fleet and hitherto commander Miguel Buiza Fernández-Palacios was relieved of his duties. President Manuel Azaña could not hide his disappointment, acknowledging in his memories the indecisiveness of the former commander of the Spanish Republican Navy despite having a greater number of ships. The fact, however was that both commanders of the fleet were only in their thirties and had been hurriedly promoted by Defence Minister Indalecio Prieto owing to the lack of loyal top officers.

Destroyer Proserpina.

Under Luis González de Ubieta's command the Republican Navy concentrated in the protection of maritime convoys that were supplying the internationally isolated Spanish Republic, as well as in the training of naval officers and their ships' crews.

In March 1938, however, Baleares, accompanied by five rebel destroyers, was engaged again by the Republican Navy off in the Battle of Cape Palos, off Cartagena's shores. During the gunnery duel, Republican destroyers Sánchez Barcáiztegui, Lepanto and Almirante Antequera, all fired their torpedoes. Two or three of Lepanto's torpedoes hit Baleares, detonating her forward magazine and sinking her. Out of her crew of 1,206, she had 765 seamen killed or missing, among them rebel vice admiral Manuel Vierna Belando, commander of the Nationalist cruiser division.

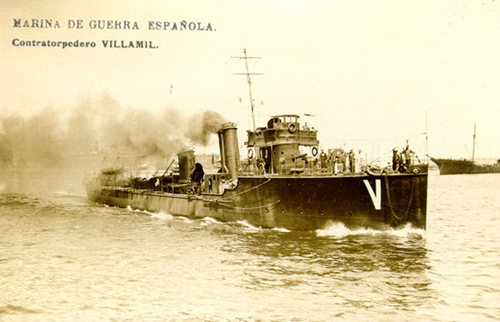
Destroyer Villaamil, second unit of the Bustamante class, during maneuvers

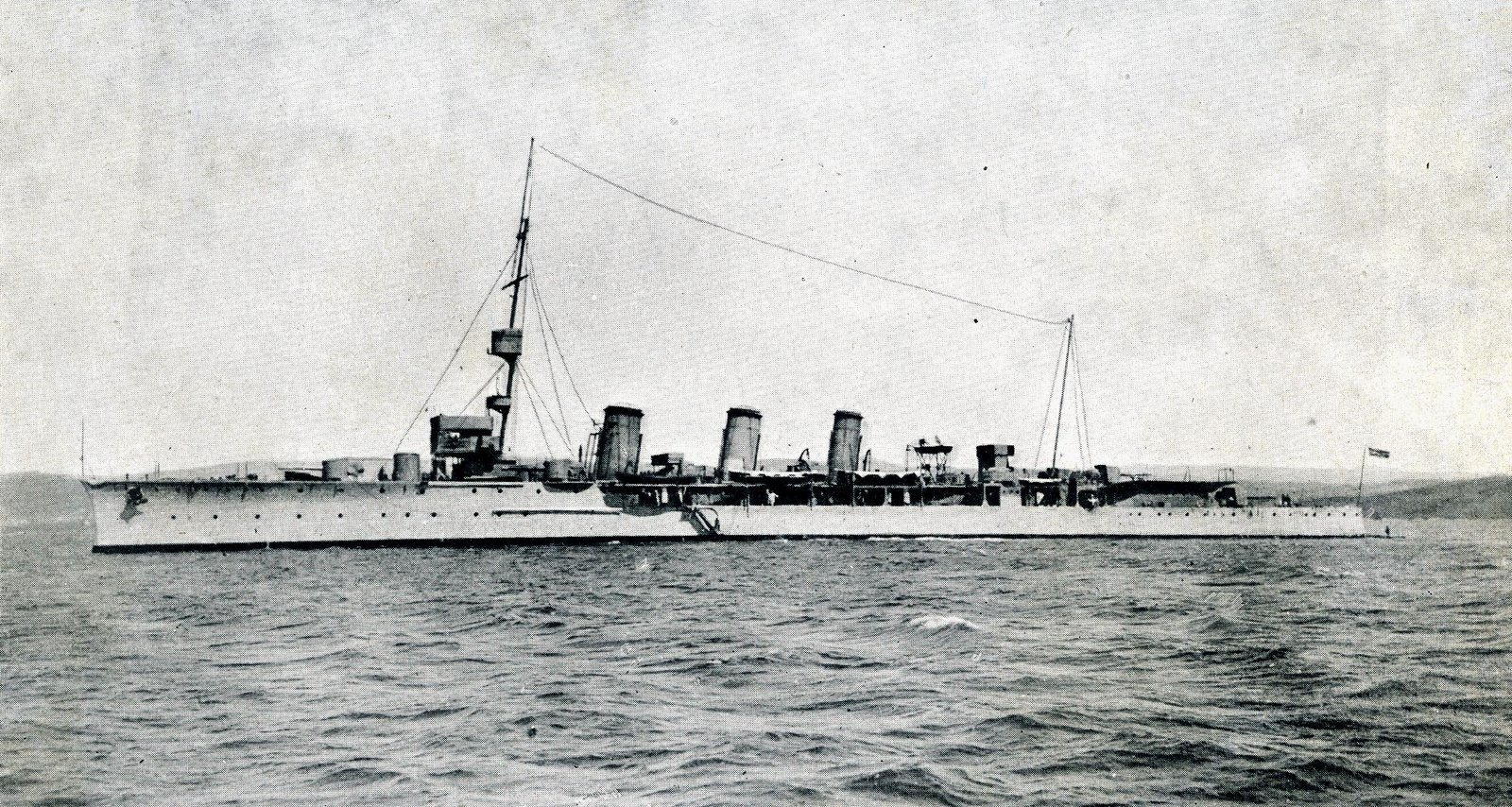
Light cruiser Blas de Lezo, sunk in an accident in 1932

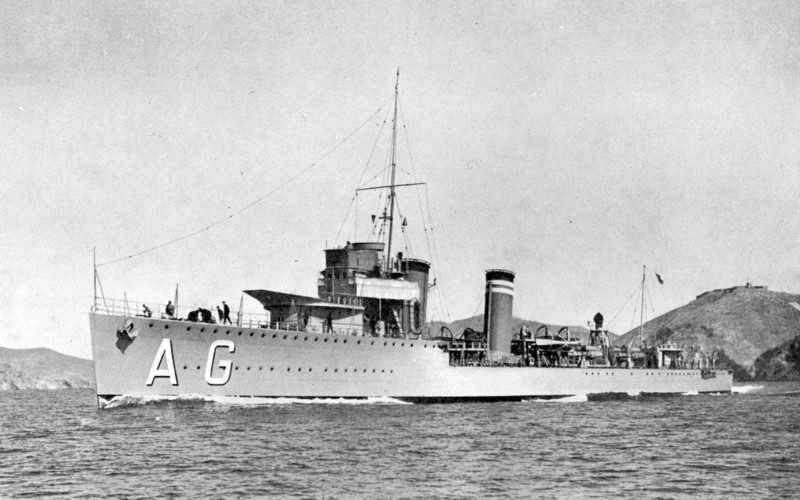
Churruca-class destroyer Alcalá Galiano

The sinking of rebel heavy cruiser Baleares was hailed as a great victory by the republican government. Following this victory, commander of the republican fleet Luis González de Ubieta was awarded the Laureate Plate of Madrid (Placa Laureada de Madrid), the highest military award for gallantry of the Second Spanish Republic. The Distintivo de Madrid, which had been established by the Spanish Republic in order to reward courage, was given to cruisers Libertad and Méndez Núñez, and destroyers Lepanto, Almirante Antequera and Sánchez Barcáiztegui, as well as to their crew members. This entitled these ships to fly a special pennant and their crews to wear a special badge on their uniforms with the old Coat of arms of Madrid. Despite the propaganda value of this victory for the Republic it had little noticeable effect on the war as a whole.

==== Twilight and end of the Civil War ====
On 5 March 1939, Spanish Republican Army Colonel Segismundo Casado made an anticommunist coup and proclaimed a (Consejo Nacional de Defensa). On the same day the Nationalist Air Force bombed the harbour of Cartagena, the main base of the Republican Navy, sinking destroyer Sanchez Barcaiztegui. Following the bombing and the unrest in the city where a rebellion was under way, Commander Miguel Buiza, who had shortly been reinstated as commander of the republican fleet, ultimately ordered the evacuation of the bulk of the seagoing Republican Armada. As soon as night fell cruisers Miguel de Cervantes, Libertad and Mendez Nuñez, destroyers Lepanto, Almirante Valdés, Almirante Antequera, Almirante Miranda, Escaño, Gravina, Jorge Juan and Ulloa as well as submarines C-2 and C-4, left Cartagena harbor speeding eastwards towards the Algerian coast. Off Oran Miguel Buiza asked for permission to anchor, but the permission was denied by the naval authorities of French Algeria. These directed him towards Bizerte in the French protectorate of Tunisia where the fleet was impounded by the French authorities. Except for a few crewmen who were put on guard duty on the ships, the Spanish Republican seamen and their officers were interned in a concentration camp at Meheri Zabbens.

In the last months of the war some of the steamers belonging to the Compañía Transatlántica Española and Trasmediterránea companies were requisitioned by the Republican Navy and were used for evacuating refugees from coastal cities besieged by the Francoist armies.

By the end of the conflict eight major Republican warships, totaling 5,676 tons, had been sunk by the enemy; the surviving ships of the Republican fleet became part of the Navy of Francoist Spain. Most of the documents relating to the Spanish Republican Navy are currently kept at the Archivo General de la Marina "Álvaro de Bazán".

== Naval Battles of the Civil War ==
- Battle of Majorca
- Battle of Cape Espartel
- Battle of Cape Cherchell
- Battle of Cape Machichaco
- Battle of Cape Palos
- Bombardment of Almería
- Convoy de la victoria

== Naval units of the Spanish Republican Navy ==
=== April 1931 – July 1936 ===
These are the main naval units between 14 April 1931 and 16 July 1936. Tankers, troop transports, tugboats, coast guard ships and torpedo boats are not included.

==== Dreadnoughts ====
- España-class battleships (16.400 t, 8 x 305 mm)
  - Alfonso XIII (1915), second España class unit. Its name was changed to España.
  - Jaime I (1921), third España class unit.

==== Cruisers ====
- Canarias-class heavy cruisers (13.000 t, 8 x 203 mm)
  - Canarias, first ship of the Canarias class; building began in 1928 at the Ferrol shipyard of the Sociedad Española de Construcción Naval (SECN).
  - Baleares. Second unit of the Canarias class, built at the same shipyard as Canarias.
- Reina Victoria Eugenia class cruiser (light cruiser, 6.500 t, 9 x 152,4 mm)
  - Republica (1923). Formerly Reina Victoria Eugenia, renamed Republica in 1931; the only vessel of her class.
- Blas de Lezo-class cruisers (light cruisers, 6,000, 6 x 152,4 mm)
  - Méndez Núñez (1924), first vessel of its class, laid down as Blas de Lezo in 1915, renamed Méndez Núñez in 1924. Commissioned in 1924.
  - Blas de Lezo (1925), second unit of the Blas de Lezo class, laid down as Méndez Núñez in 1920, renamed Blas de Lezo in 1924. Commissioned in 1925. Sank in 1932 after striking an uncharted rock.
- Almirante Cervera-class light cruisers (9.000 t 8 x 152,4 mm)
  - Libertad (1927). Formerly Príncipe Alfonso, renamed Libertad in 1931; first vessel of the Almirante Cervera class. Flagship of the Spanish Republican Navy.
  - Almirante Cervera (1928), second unit of the class.
  - Miguel de Cervantes (1930), third unit of the Almirante Cervera class.
- Río de la Plata (1900), the only vessel of its class. Since 1921 it had been used to house and train Aeronáutica Naval personnel of the Barcelona seaplane base.
- Emperador Carlos V (1898), the only vessel of her class. Armored cruiser used as a pontoon for exercises until it was scrapped in 1933.

==== Destroyers ====
- Furor-class destroyers (380 t, 2 x 75 mm)
  - Proserpina (P) (1898), sixth unit of the Furor class. Scrapped in 1931.
- Bustamante-class destroyers (370 t, 5 x 57 mm)
  - Bustamante (B) (1917), third unit of the Bustamante class. Scrapped in 1931.
  - Villaamil (V) (1916), second unit of the class. Scrapped in 1932.
- Alsedo-class destroyers (1.160 t, 3 x 101,6 mm)
  - Alsedo (A) (1924), first unit of its class
  - Velasco (V) (1925), second unit of the class.
  - Lazaga (L) (1924), third unit of the class.
- Churruca-class destroyers (1600 t, 5 x 120 mm)
  - First series
    - Sánchez Barcáiztegui (SB) (1928), third unit.
    - José Luis Díez (JD) (1929), fourth unit.
    - Almirante Ferrándiz (AF) (1929), fifth unit.
    - Lepanto (L) (1930), sixth unit.
    - Churruca (CH) (1931), seventh unit.
    - Alcalá Galiano (AG) (1931), eight unit.
    - Almirante Valdés (VS), ninth unit, under construction at the Sociedad Española de Construcción Naval (SECN) in Cartagena.
  - Second series (All built at SECN Cartagena)
    - Almirante Antequera (AA)
    - Almirante Miranda (AM)
    - Císcar (CR)
    - Escaño (E)
    - Gravina (G)
    - Jorge Juan (JJ)
    - Ulloa (UA)

==== Other vessels ====
- Seaplane carrier Dédalo (1922). Decommissioned in 1934 and struck in April 1936
- Submarine rescue ship Kanguro (1920)
- Transport Almirante Lobo (1909)
- Training ship Galatea (1922)
- Training ship Juan Sebastián Elcano (1927)

==== Submarines ====
- Isaac Peral (1917), United States-built, similar to Holland Type M-1. Named after submarine pioneer Isaac Peral. Decomisionated in 1932, scrapped.
- A-class submarines, Italian made
  - Narciso Monturiol (A-1) (1917), named after submarine pioneer Narcís Monturiol. Decomisionated in 1934, scrapped.
  - Cosme García (A-2) (1917), named after submarine pioneer Cosme García Saez. Decomisionated in 1931, scrapped.
  - A-3 (1917), decomissionned in 1932, scrapped.
- B-class submarines. Built in Spain similar to the Cachalot class
  - B-1 (1922), B-class first unit.
  - B-2 (1922), B-class second unit.
  - B-3 (1922), B-class third unit.
  - B-4 (1923), B-class fourth unit.
  - B-5 (1925), B-class fifth unit.
  - B-6 (1926), B-class sixth unit.
- C-class submarines
  - Isaac Peral (C-1) (1928), C-class first unit, originally named C-1, renamed after submarine pioneer Isaac Peral in 1932.
  - C-2 (1928), C-class second unit.
  - C-3 (1929), C-class third unit. Sunk by Nazi German submarine U-34 on 12 December 1936 near Malaga
  - C-4 (1929), C-class fourth unit.
  - C-5 (1930), C-class fifth unit.
  - C-6 (1930), C-class sixth unit.

=== July 1936 – early 1939 ===
Profile of the Jaime I with its appearance in 1937

These are the main naval units of the Spanish Republican Navy between the July coup against the Spanish Republic and the defeat of the Republican Armed Forces in the Civil War. All surviving ships became part of the Navy of Francoist Spain.

==== Dreadnoughts ====
- Jaime I (1921–1937), sunk on 17 June 1937 after an explosion during repair works. Some authors believe the explosion was the result of sabotage by Fifth columnist organization Socorro Blanco members in Cartagena.

==== Cruisers ====
- Blas de Lezo class
  - Méndez Núñez, (1924–1963), fled to Bizerte after the March 1939 events in Cartagena
- Almirante Cervera class
  - Libertad, (1927–1965), ex-Príncipe Alfonso, fled to Bizerte after the March 1939 events in Cartagena
  - Almirante Cervera, (1928–1965)
  - Miguel de Cervantes, (1930–1964), damaged by a torpedo fired by a Fascist Italian submarine at the beginning of the Civil War. It was fully repaired almost at the end of the war and fled to Bizerte after the March 1939 events in Cartagena

==== Destroyers ====
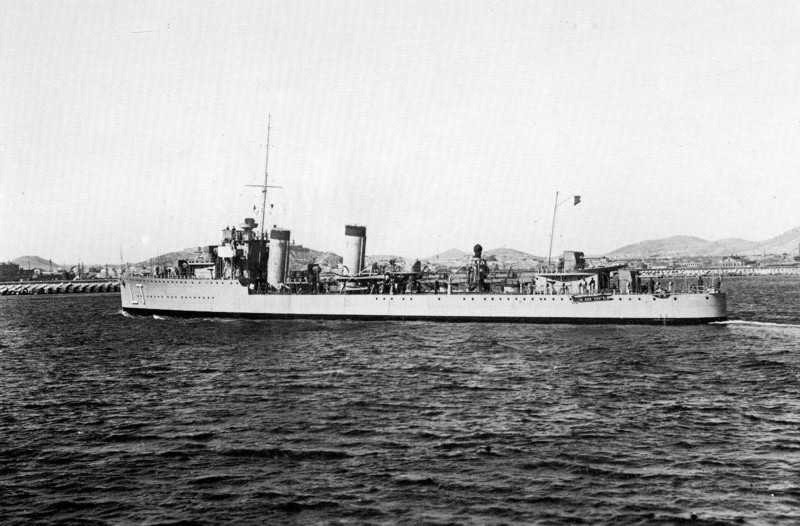
Destroyer Lepanto, one of the Republican Navy ships that left Cartagena for Bizerte in March 1939.

- Alsedo class
  - Alsedo (A), (1924–1957), seized by the rebels at Cartagena harbor at the end of the Civil War
  - Lazaga (L), (1925–1961), at the dockyard in Cartagena at the end of the Civil War
- Churruca class
  - First series
    - Sánchez Barcáiztegui (SB), (1928–1964), sunk during the March 1939 events in Cartagena, refloated and still at the dockyard in Cartagena by the end of the Civil War
    - José Luis Díez (JD), (1929–1965), became part of the Basque Auxiliary Navy in 1936. Grounded in Gibraltar after a naval battle with the Nationalist fleet in late 1938.
    - Almirante Ferrándiz (AF), (1929–1936), sunk by cruiser Canarias on 21 September 1936 in the Battle of Cape Espartel
    - Lepanto (LE), (1930–1957), probably fired the torpedo that sank the Nattionalist cruiser Baleares; fled to Bizerte after the March 1939 events in Cartagena.
    - Churruca (CH) (1931–1963), seized by the rebels at Cartagena harbor at the end of the Civil War
    - Alcalá Galiano (AG), (1931–1957), at the dockyard in Cartagena by the end of the Civil War
    - Almirante Valdés (AV), (1933–1957), fled to Bizerte after the March 1939 events in Cartagena
  - Second series
    - Almirante Antequera (AA), (1935–1965), fled to Bizerte after the March 1939 events in Cartagena
    - Almirante Miranda (AM), (1936–1970), fled to Bizerte after the March 1939 events in Cartagena
    - Císcar (CR), (1936–1957), became part of the Basque Auxiliary Navy in 1936. She was bombed and sunk in 1937 at El Musel, Asturias. Refloated and used by the rebel navy in 1938
    - Escaño (E), (1936–1963), fled to Bizerte after the March 1939 events in Cartagena
    - Gravina (G), (1936–1963), fled to Bizerte after the March 1939 events in Cartagena
    - Jorge Juan (JJ), (1937–1959), fled to Bizerte after the March 1939 events in Cartagena
    - Ulloa (UA), (1937–1963), fled to Bizerte after the March 1939 events in Cartagena
  - Third series
    - Liniers, under construction in Cartagena
    - General Álava, under construction in Cartagena

==== Submarines ====
- B-class submarines
  - B-1, (1922–1940), wrecked in Cartagena in 1937
  - B-2, (1922–1952), beached in Cartagena
  - B-3, (1922–1940), beached in Cartagena
  - B-4, (1923–1941), beached in Cartagena
  - B-5, (1925–1936), sunk off Estepona
  - B-6, (1926–1936), sunk by Nationalist destroyer Velasco
- C-class submarines
  - Isaac Peral (C-1), (1928–1950), sunk in 1938 and repaired after the Civil War
  - C-2, (1928–1951), fled to Bizerte after the March 1939 events in Cartagena
  - C-3, (1928–1936), sunk off Málaga by German submarine U-34 of the Nazi Kriegsmarine during Operation Ursula
  - C-4, (1928–1946), fled to Bizerte after the March 1939 events in Cartagena
  - C-5, (1928–1937), fate unknown
  - C-6, (1928–1937), sunk
- D-class submarines
  - D-1, under construction in Cartagena
  - D-2, under construction in Cartagena
  - D-3, under construction in Cartagena

== Aeronáutica Naval ==
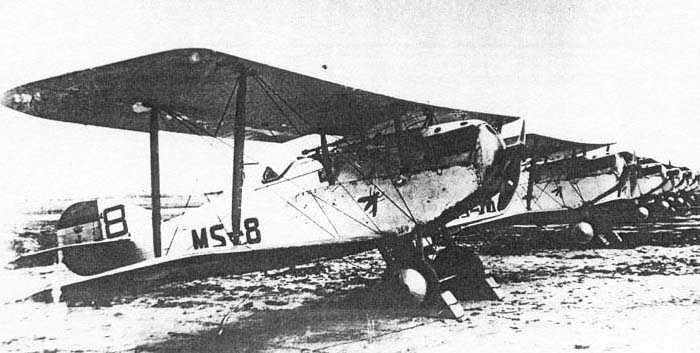
Aeronáutica Naval Martinsyde F.4 Buzzard

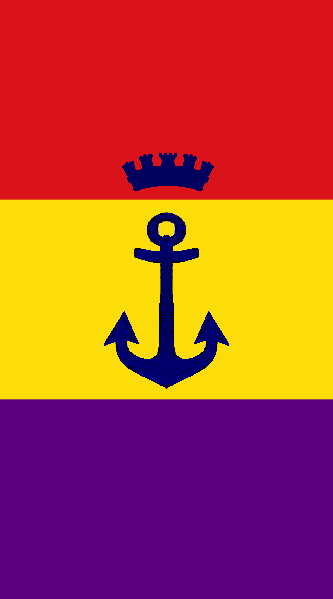
Fin flash of the Aeronáutica Naval (1931-1936)

The Aeronáutica Naval was the naval aviation of the Spanish Republican Navy. In 1920 the air arm of the navy, already established through a Royal decree four years earlier, became functional in El Prat, in the same location as present-day Barcelona Airport. It was merged with the air arm of the Spanish Republican Army in September 1936, after the reorganization of the armed forces following the July 1936 coup, becoming part of the Spanish Republican Air Force.

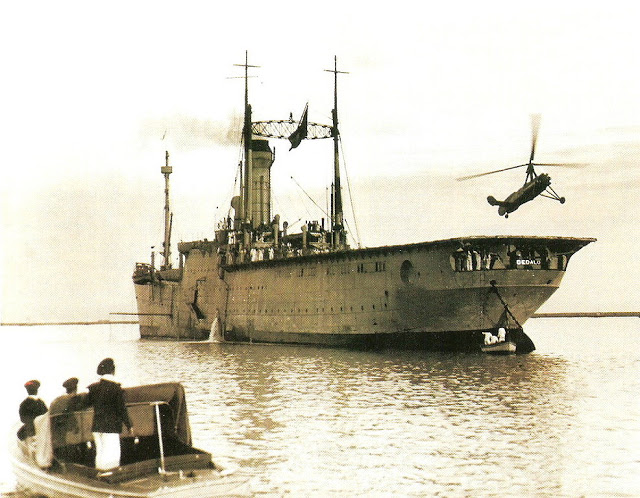
The first rotorcraft to take off and land on the deck of a ship, 7 March 1934

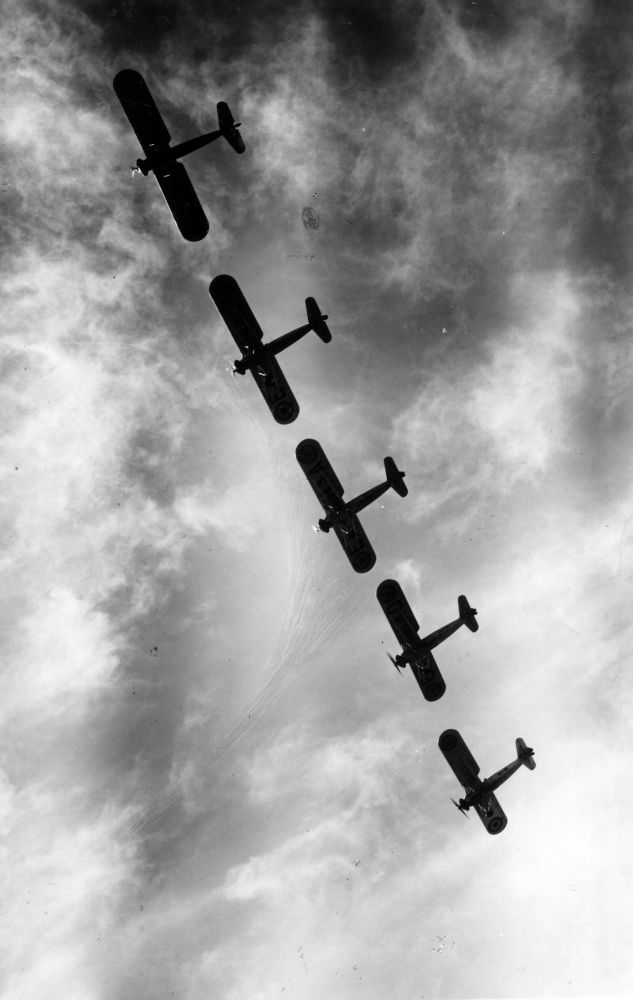
Hispano E-30s of Aeronáutica Naval in formation

By 1931 the planes used by the Aeronáutica Naval were becoming obsolete. Commander (later Admiral) Francisco Moreno Fernández made a survey between 1932 and 1933 and concluded that the old Dornier and Savoia seaplanes were not fit to carry aerial torpedoes or bombs and were only fit for reconnaissance missions. Some Vickers Vildebeest were being built under license by CASA for the Aeronáutica Naval, but they had not been ordered with weapon-carrying systems, therefore many officers had doubts about their usefulness. Those officers concerned about the modernization of the Republican Armada also pointed out the fact that none of the newest vessels at that time were equipped to carry planes. The seaplane carrier Dédalo, although it had very useful and efficient aircraft-repair workshops on it, was a slow and old steamer that could not last much longer, in the words of Moreno.

On 7 March 1934 aviation history was made when Juan de la Cierva, the inventor of the autogyro, performed a perfect landing onto Dédalo with a model C. 30 autogyro registered G-ACIO, near the port of Valencia; half an hour later it took off from her deck, after a short run of just 24 metres (79 feet). This was the first rotorcraft to take off and land on the deck of a ship.

The two Canarias-class heavy cruisers that had been under construction since 1928 had been planned to carry at least a seaplane, but no decision had been yet made concerning the type of aircraft catapult or the model of plane that would be carried. Finally in 1934 the Spanish Republican Navy contacted Hawker Aircraft regarding the purchase of four Hawker Osprey seaplanes for the Canarias-class heavy cruisers under construction. In the end only one aircraft, known as 'Spanish Osprey' and fitted with a Hispano-Suiza 12Xbrs engine, would be delivered.

In 1932 the old Avro 504K trainers were replaced by the more modern Hispano Aviación E-30. Between 1934 and 1935 the Republican Navy tried to modernize its ageing seaplane fleet and contemplated replacing the Dornier Do J Wal seaplanes with Breguet 521 Bizerte and the Macchi M.18 with Potez 452.

Until 1936 the Aeronáutica Naval had an airship section as well. In 1934, when the seaplane carrier Dédalo was decommissioned the Aeronáutica Naval lost most of its officers, who were transferred to other branches of the Spanish Republican Navy.

== The Infantería de Marina ==
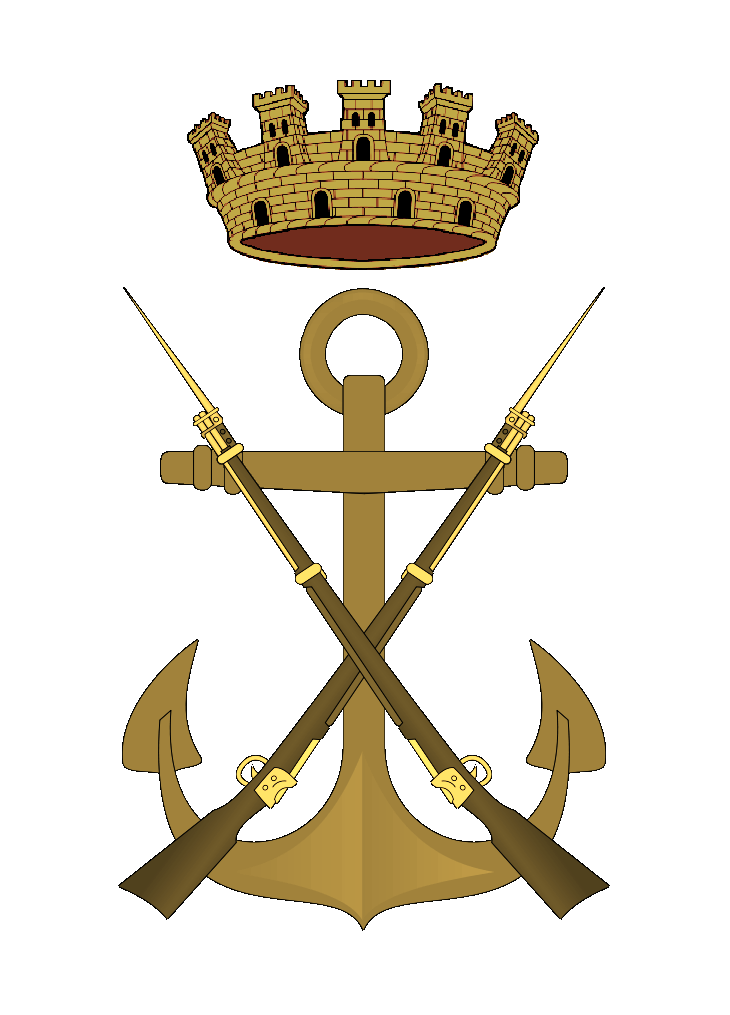
Insignia of the Spanish Republican Navy Marine Corps (1931-1939)

The Spanish Navy Marines (Infantería de Marina) was labelled as a "colonial force" in the early days of the Spanish Republic because of the high-profile role it had had in the unpopular 1920–1926 wars in North Africa. Newly nominated Minister of War Manuel Azaña planned eventually to disband the marine corps as part of his hasty reforms of the Spanish armed forces.

However the Civil war began before the Infantería de Marina was officially disbanded and in October 1936 the War Ministry was replaced by the 'National Defence Ministry' (Ministerio de la Defensa Nacional), led by the prime minister, Largo Caballero. Thus the Spanish Republican Navy Marines of the areas of Spain that had remained loyal to the government were not disbanded and became part of the new military structure of the republic. At the republican naval base of Cartagena the Tercio de Levante Marine corps was garrisoned and used mainly for guarding moored ships and naval facilities, as well as for manning anti-aircraft guns.

Some republican Infantería de Marina units also saw frontline combat action; the 151 Brigada Mixta, was a mixed brigade composed of Spanish Republican Navy Marines led by Commander Pedro Muñoz Caro. Its landing operations activity was limited, however, by the lack of offensive actions and the general ineffectiveness of the Spanish Republican Navy. Therefore, these Republican Marines saw action mostly inland supporting the Army in such battles as the Battle of Alfambra, Battle of Brunete, Battle of the Ebro and the Battle of the Segre, far away from the sea. Photographer Robert Capa took pictures of the Spanish Republican Navy Marines in one of these inland battles.

Republican Infantería de Marina Lieutenant Colonel Ambrosio Ristori de la Cuadra, killed in action during the Siege of Madrid, was posthumously awarded the Laureate Plate of Madrid.

== Ranks ==
The Spanish Republican Navy introduced a few changes in the flags, ensigns and pennants, as well as in the Navy officer rank insignia. The executive curl (La coca) was replaced by a golden five-pointed star and the royal crown of the brass buttons and of the officers' peaked caps and gorgets (golas) became a mural crown. The officer ranks of the Spanish Republican Navy were as follows below.

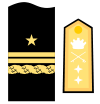
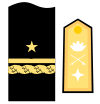
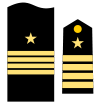
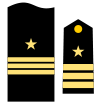
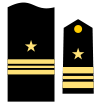
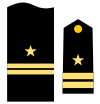
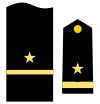
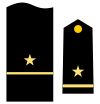
Rank group	General / flag officers		Senior officers			Junior officers
Spanish Republican Navy (1931–1936)
Spanish Republican Navy (1931–1936)	Vicealmirante	Contraalmirante	Capitán de navío	Capitán de fragata	Capitán de corbeta	Teniente de navío	Alférez de navío	Alférez de fragata
Aeronáutica Naval (1931–1936)
Aeronáutica Naval (1931–1936)			Capitán de navío	Capitán de fragata	Capitán de corbeta	Teniente de navío	Alférez de navío	Alférez de fragata
Spanish Republican Navy (1936–1939)
Spanish Republican Navy (1936–1939)	Capitán de navío acting as Vicealmirante	Capitán de navío acting as Contraalmirante	Capitán de navío	Capitán de fragata	Capitán de corbeta	Teniente de navío	Alférez de navío	Alférez de fragata

=== Ranks of Non-commissioned officers and Enlisted ===
Rank group	Senior NCOs				Junior NCOs	Enlisted
Spanish Republican Navy (1931–1939)
Spanish Republican Navy (1931–1939)	Subteniente	Subayudante (1931–1935)	Brigada	Sargento	Cabo	Marinero de primera	Marinero

=== Rank flags and pennants ===
The rank flags and pennants of the Spanish Republican Navy followed the same pattern that had been established for the Spanish Navy in 1914. The only changes were the stripes of equal width and the replacing of the red color of the lower stripe with the morado of the Republican Tricolor.

Rank flag of the Minister of the Navy (Ministro de Marina)

Viceadmiral rank flag

Viceadmiral rank flag (subordinate)

Rear Admiral rank flag

Rear Admiral rank flag (subordinate)

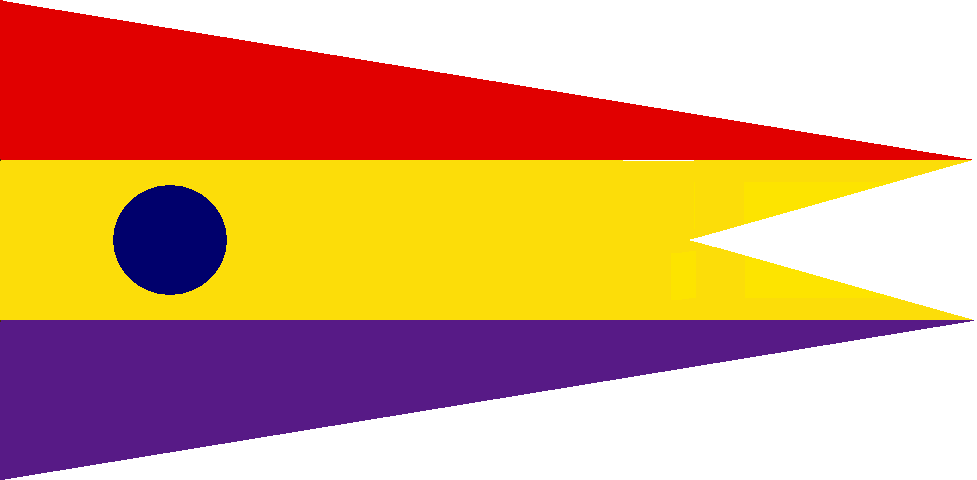
Gallardetón. Captain at Sea Pennant (in command of a naval squadron).

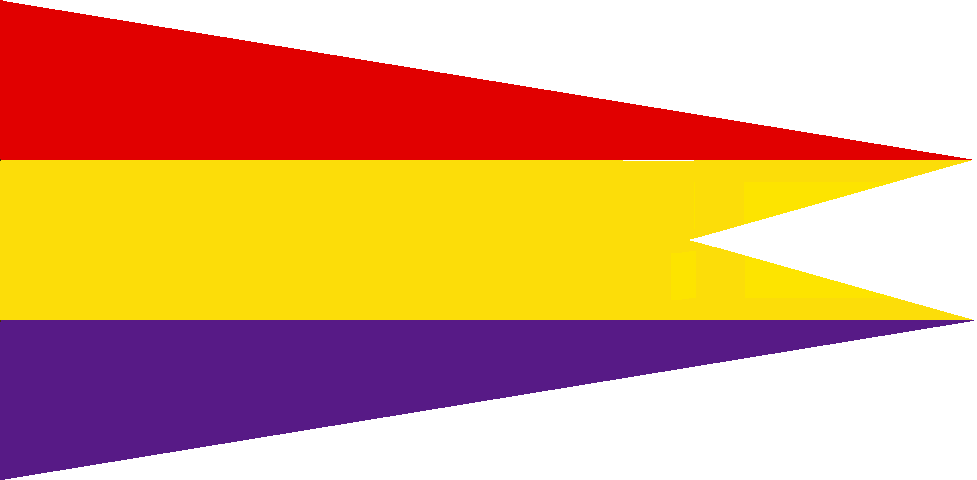
Gallardetón. Captain at Sea Pennant (in command of a naval division).

Gallardete. Commissioning pennant

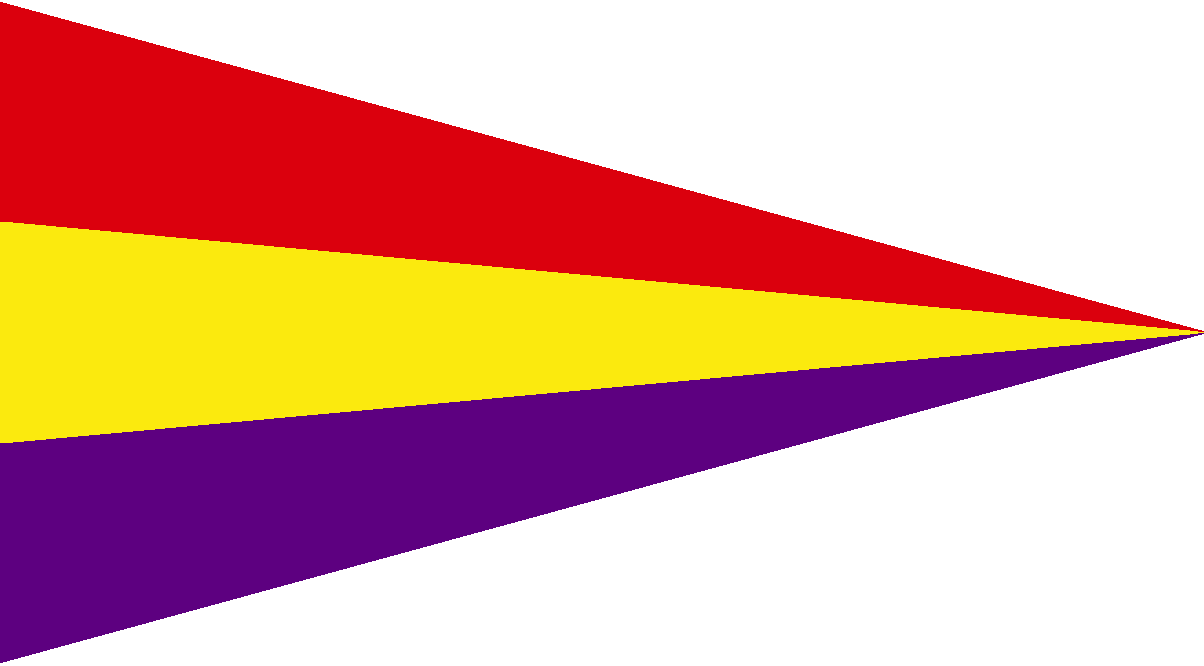
Grímpola. Senior Officer Pennant

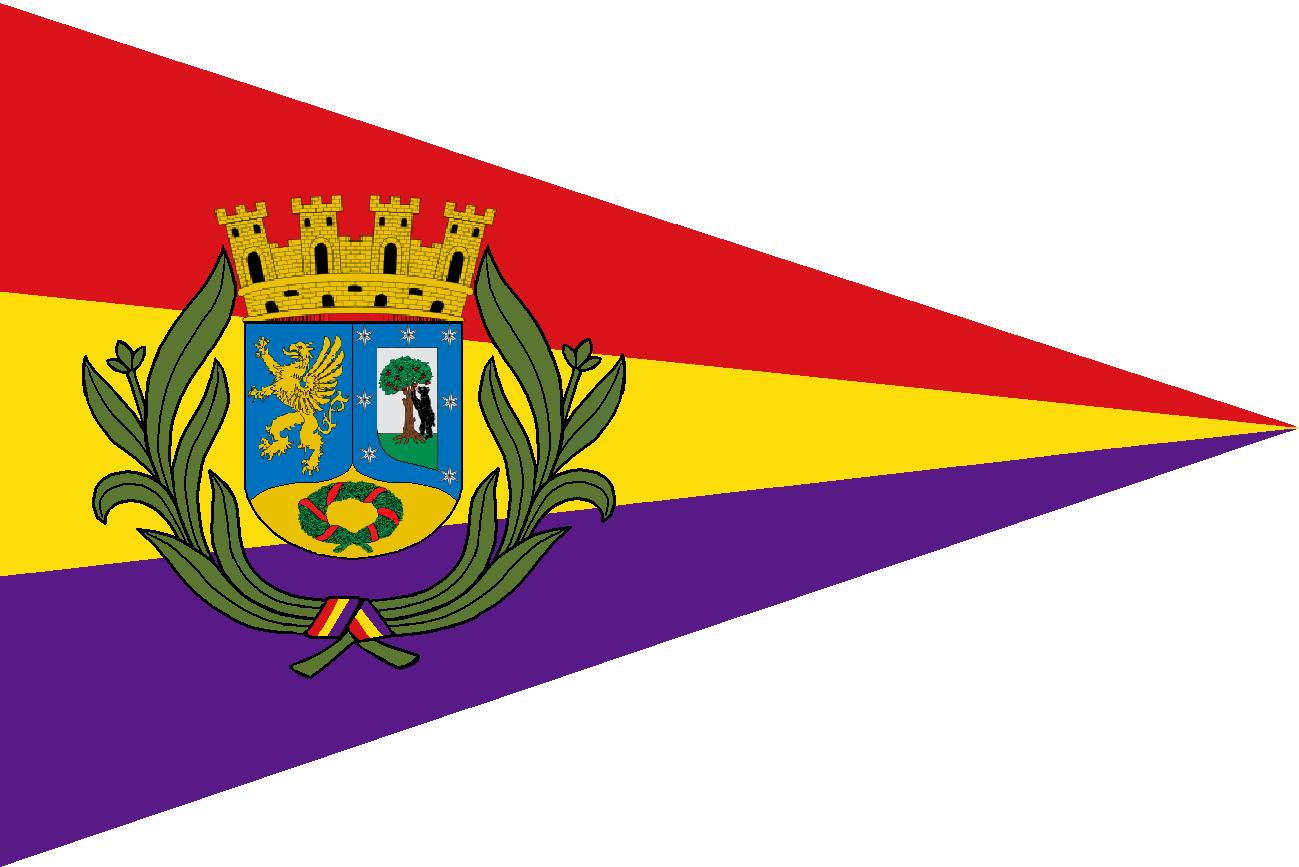
Distintivo de Madrid pennant awarded in 1938 to the vessels that took part in the Battle of Cape Palos

== See also ==
- Spanish Navy
- Basque Auxiliary Navy
- German involvement in the Spanish Civil War
- List of foreign ships wrecked or lost in the Spanish Civil War
- List of retired Spanish Navy ships

== Bibliography ==
- Bruno Alonso González, La flota republicana y la guerra civil de España, Ed. Renacimiento, México 1944 ISBN 84-96133-75-3
- Michael Alpert, La Guerra Civil española en el mar, Editorial Critica, ISBN 978-84-8432-975-6
- José Cervera, Avatares de la guerra española en el mar, Editorial Noray, 2011, ISBN 978-84-7486-237-9
