= Spanish destroyer Almirante Miranda =

History

Spain
- Name: Almirante Miranda
- Namesake: Augusto Miranda y Godoy
- Builder: S.E.C.N in Cartagena
- Launched: 20 June 1931
- Commissioned: 1936
- Fate: Scrapped 23 March 1970

General characteristics
- Class & type: Churruca class
- Displacement: 1536 tons
- Length: 101 m (331.36 ft)
- Beam: 39 ft 8 in (12.1 m)
- Draft: 3.3 m (10.83 ft)
- Installed power: 42,000 shp (31,000 kW)
- Propulsion: 2 × Parsons turbines; 4 × Yarrow boilers; 2 × screws
- Speed: 36 knots (67 km/h; 41 mph)
- Range: 4,500 nmi (5,200 mi; 8,300 km) @ 14 kn (16 mph; 26 km/h)
- Armament: 4 × 120 mm L.45 Vickers cannon; 1 × 76.2 mm A.A cannon; 4 × machine guns; 6 × 533 mm torpedo tubes; 2 × depth charge racks

Almirante Miranda (AM) was a Churruca-class destroyer that fought in the Spanish Civil War on the Republican side and, after the war, joined the post-war Spanish Navy. She was named after Admiral Augusto Miranda y Godoy, a Spanish Minister of the Navy.

== Spanish Civil War ==
During the Spanish Civil War Almirante Miranda operated in the Mediterranean, where she took part in the failed invasion of Majorca, as well as in the Battle of Cape Cherchell, under the command of Captain Alberto Bayo.

On 12 July 1937, she engaged the Nationalist heavy cruiser Baleares, along with Lepanto, Churruca, Almirante Valdés, Gravina and Sánchez Baircáztegui, while the ships were escorting the oiler Campillo. Both sides retreated after exchanging salvos for an hour, Baleares deciding to do so after her crew discovered that her guns overheated after 50 shots.

On 5 March 1939, she left Cartagena along with most of the Republican Navy following the uprising in the city, reaching Bizerta on 11 March. The next day, the crews solicited political asylum in Tunisia. Most of the ship's crews were interned, with a few Spaniards left to guard the ships. The rest were transported to a concentration camp in Meheri Zabbens.

On 31 March 1939, the ships Mallorca and Marqués de Comillas arrived in Bizerta, carrying the personnel tasked with taking over the interned ships.

== After the Civil War ==
On 2 April, merely 24 hours after the war concluded, Almirante Miranda and the other ships that left Cartagena sailed to Cádiz, arriving in the last hours of 5 April.

On 7 December 1957, during the Ifni War, a fleet composed of the heavy cruiser Canarias, the light cruiser Méndez Núñez and the destroyers Churruca, Almirante Miranda, Escaño, Gravina and José Luis Díez took part in a show of force off the port of Agadir, aiming their guns at different targets in the port.

She was retired from service in 1970, being the last Churruca-class destroyer to do so.
