= Miguel Buiza Fernández-Palacios =

Miguel Buiza
- Born: Miguel Buiza Fernández-Palacios; 25 January 1898; Sevilla, Andalusia, Spain
- Died: 23 June 1963 (aged 65); Marseille, France
- Burial place: Hyères graveyard, Var
- Military career
- Allegiance: Spanish Republic; France
- Branch: Spanish Republican Navy; French Foreign Legion
- Rank: Commander of the Fleet
- Conflicts: Spanish Civil War: Battle of Majorca; Battle of Cape Cherchell; Tunisia Campaign
- Awards: War Cross

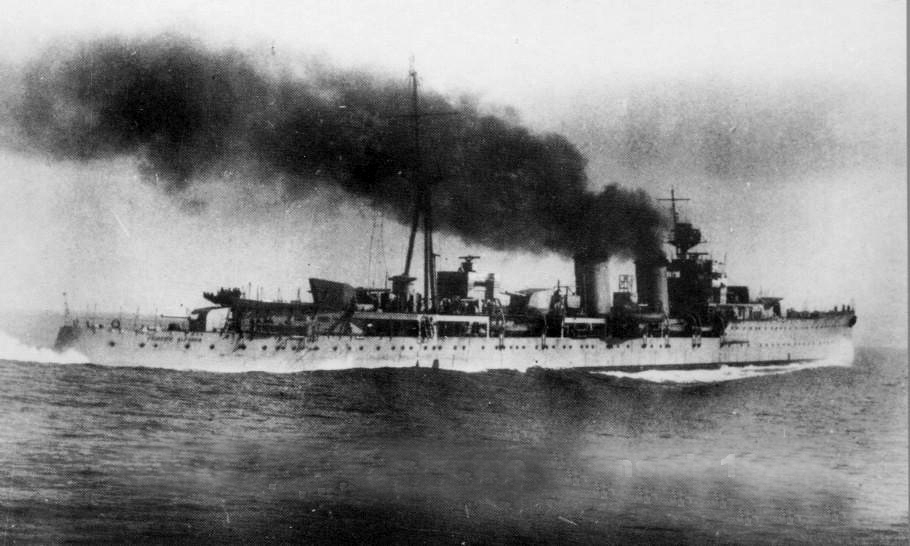
Light cruiser Libertad. Miguel Buiza was commander of this Republican Navy ship when he became Captain General of the Spanish Republican Fleet.

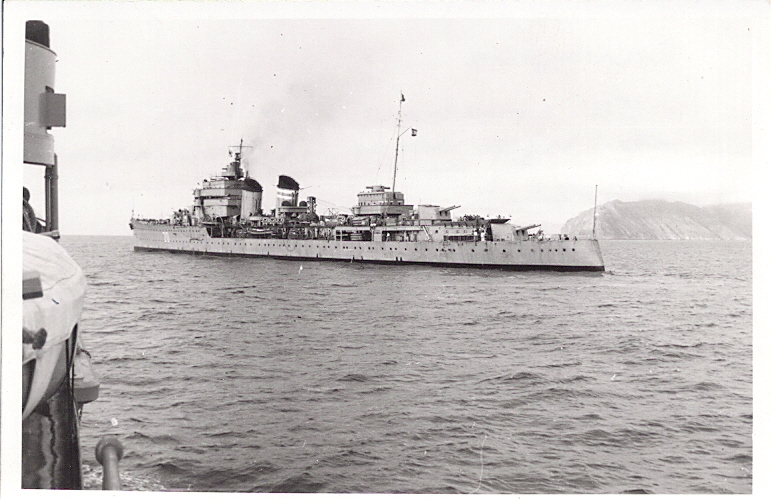
Cruiser Miguel de Cervantes, the ship on which Miguel Buiza left Cartagena for Bizerte leading the remnant of the Spanish Republican Armada in March 1939.

Miguel Buiza Fernández-Palacios (25 January 1898 – 23 June 1963) was a Spanish Navy officer best known for being the commander of the Spanish Republican Navy during the Spanish Civil War. He died in exile in Marseille in 1963.

Miguel Buiza is often referred to as an admiral, owing to his high-profile role leading the Spanish Republican Armada, but there are sources that claim that he never rose above the rank of captain (Capitán de Navío)

== Early life ==
Miguel Buiza was born in a wealthy family of factory owners in Seville. In 1915, Buiza entered the Naval Academy at San Fernando. By 1932, he had reached the rank of lieutenant commander (Spanish: Capitán de Corbeta) of the Spanish Republican Navy. Four years later, when the Spanish Civil War started, he was in command of the military tugboat Cíclope (RA-1) and refused to join the July 1936 pro-Fascist coup, remaining loyal to the republic. His brother Francisco, a commander of the Spanish Republican Army, joined the rebel faction after the coup and was killed in action in the front near Madrid early in the Civil War.

== Civil war ==
In early August 1936, at the beginning of the war, Miguel Buiza took part in the blockade of the Strait of Gibraltar as commander of the light cruiser Libertad. Later in the same month, he saw action in the Battle of Majorca in support of the failed Republican landing operation at Porto Cristo.

On 2 September, Miguel Buiza was named Captain General of the republican fleet by Indalecio Prieto, the Navy and Air Minister (Ministro de Marina y Aire), while keeping the command of the Libertad. Buiza was only 38 years old at the time. In the dire 1936 post-coup reorganization of the Spanish Republican Armed Forces, Prieto did away with the Navy 'ship committees' and sought to create a structure that would reimpose discipline after the bulk of the top commanders had defected to the rebels.

Following the disappointing defeat of the Spanish Republican fleet on 27 September 1938 at the Battle of Cape Cherchell, when a series of tactical mistakes on the part of the Republican command resulted in the loss of two cargo ships, Miguel Buiza was relieved of his duties as commander of the Navy and replaced by Captain Luis González de Ubieta who was promoted to admiral. President Manuel Azaña acknowledged in his memoirs his disappointment in the indecisiveness of the commander of the Spanish Republican Navy, despite having a greater number of ships. After being demoted, Buiza was transferred from one post to another, such as Inspector of naval bases, Chief of staff of the Navy and then also secondary posts such as naval personnel director, until he was reinstated to Captain General of the Republican Armada in February 1939.

Shortly thereafter, on 5 March 1939, Spanish Republican Army Colonel Segismundo Casado launched an anticommunist coup and proclaimed a National Defence Council (Consejo Nacional de Defensa) in order to seek an armistice with the rebels and end the fratricidal war, a measure that Miguel Buiza favored. On the same day, the Nationalist Air Force bombed the harbour of Cartagena, the main base of the Republican Navy, sinking the destroyer Sanchez Barcaiztegui. Following the bombing and the unrest in the city, where a rebellion was under way between adversaries and supporters of the continuation of the civil war, Miguel Buiza decided to evacuate the seaworthy units of the Republican fleet. As soon as night fell, at least three cruisers, eight destroyers and two submarines left Cartagena harbor, speeding for the high seas.

The fleet took an eastward course, led by Miguel Buiza aboard the cruiser Miguel de Cervantes, and reached Algerian waters. Off Oran, Buiza asked for permission to anchor, but the naval authorities of French Algeria would not allow him to lead the Spanish Republican ships into their main base. They directed him to Bizerte in the French protectorate of Tunisia, where the fleet arrived on 7 March. Not long after anchoring, the fleet was impounded by the French authorities. Except for a few crewmen who were put on guard duty on the ships, the Spanish Republican seamen and their officers were interned in a concentration camp at Meheri Zabbens, near Meknassy, in an abandoned phosphate mine. Miguel Buiza refused any special treatment and asked to be interned together with the other sailors.

== Exile ==
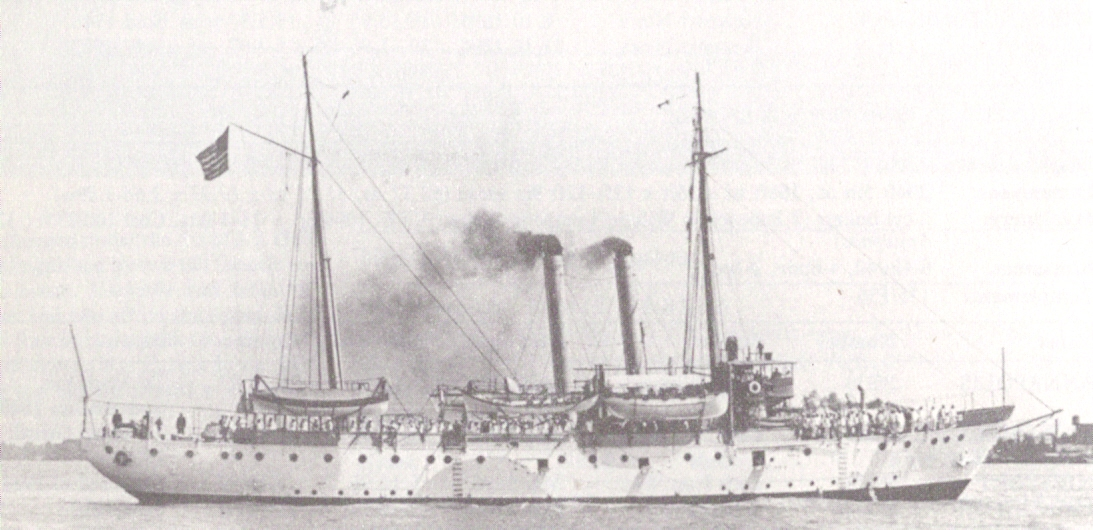
USS Paducah, the vessel that was renamed Geula, meaning "Redemption," when led by Miguel Buiza to bring Jewish survivors of Nazi concentration camps to Palestine.

In May 1939, after the Spanish Republic had already lost the civil war, Miguel Buiza asked the French government for permission to join the French Foreign Legion (Légion étrangère), where he was admitted as foreign officer with the rank of captain. At the beginning of World War II, Buiza had been promoted to commander, but in mid 1940, he resigned following the Second Armistice at Compiègne between Nazi Germany and the Third French Republic. Certain sources claim though that he was forced out of the French Foreign Legion by the new authorities of Vichy France because of his antifascist past.

Miguel Buiza settled in Oran, where he worked as an accountant in a hotel. In 1947, he was recruited by Zeev Hadari, one of the representatives in France of the Hamossad Le'aliyah Bet, the Haganah branch in the British Mandate of Palestine that facilitated Jewish immigration to Palestine in violation of British restrictions.

Under the name "Moshé Blum", Buiza became the commander of the merchant vessel Geula, the former USS Paducah. On 2 October 1947, the ship was intercepted while trying to run the British blockade and bring Jewish refugees to Palestine. Buiza was arrested by the British authorities and interned in a concentration camp near Haifa.

After regaining his freedom, Miguel Buiza returned to Oran. In 1962, following the Évian Accords and the independence of Algeria, he joined the exodus of the Pieds-Noirs and went to France as a refugee.

Miguel Buiza died from lung cancer while in exile in Marseille, on 23 June 1963, barely a year after his arrival from Algeria, without having been able to return to Seville, the city of his birth. He is buried at the graveyard in Hyères, in the Var department. Less than two months after Miguel Buiza's death his widow published a short obituary in the Spanish ABC newspaper.

== See also ==
- Cartagena Uprising
- Spanish Republican Navy
- Aliyah Bet

== Bibliography ==
- Graham, Helen. The Spanish Civil War. Oxford University Press. 2005. ISBN 978-0-19-280377-1
- Jackson, Gabriel. The Spanish Republic and the Civil War, 1931-1939. Princeton. Princeton University Press. 1967. ISBN 0-691-00757-8
- Preston, Paul. The Spanish Civil War. Reaction, revolution & revenge. Harper Perennial. London. 2006. ISBN 978-0-00-723207-9 ISBN 0-00-723207-1
- Thomas, Hugh. The Spanish Civil War. Penguin Books. London. 2003. ISBN 978-0-14-101161-5
