= Alsedo-class destroyer =

Spanish destroyer class

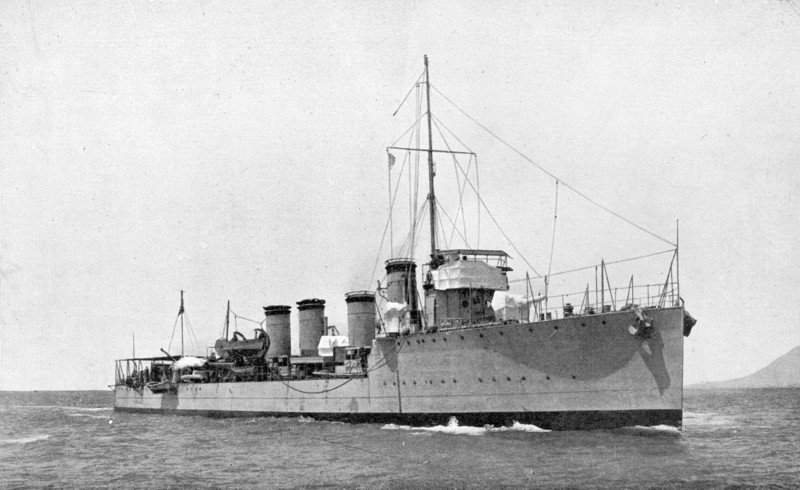
- Alsedo in about 1925

Class overview
- Name: Alsedo class
- Builders: SECN, Naval Dockyard, Cartagena
- Operators: Spanish Navy
- Preceded by: Bustamante class
- Succeeded by: Churruca class
- Built: 1920–1925
- In commission: 1924–1961
- Completed: 3
- Scrapped: 3

General characteristics
- Type: Destroyer
- Displacement: 1,044 long tons (1,061 t) standard; 1,315 long tons (1,336 t) full load
- Length: 83.82 m (275 ft) pp; 86.25 m (283 ft) oa
- Beam: 8.23 m (27 ft)
- Draught: 4.57 m (15 ft)
- Installed power: 4 × Yarrow boilers; 33,000 shp (25,000 kW)
- Propulsion: 2 shafts; 2 geared steam turbines
- Speed: 34 knots (63 km/h; 39 mph)
- Range: 2,500 nmi (4,630 km; 2,877 mi) at 15 knots (28 km/h; 17 mph)
- Complement: 86
- Armament: 3 × 102 mm (4 in)/45 guns; 2 × 47 mm (2 in) anti-aircraft guns; 4 × 533 mm (21 in) torpedo tubes (2×2)

The Alsedo class was a Spanish class of destroyer. Three ships were built, based on a British design, entering service between 1924 and 1925. They all served through and survived the Spanish Civil War, two on the Republican side and one with the Nationalists. The class was retired between 1957 and 1961.

== Design and construction ==
On 17 February 1915, the Spanish Cortes (Parliament) passed a navy law authorising a large programme of construction for the Spanish Navy, including three destroyers of British design, the Alsedo class, to be built in Spain at the Sociedad Española de Construcción Naval (SECN) dockyard at Cartagena.

The design chosen, a joint effort by Vickers and John Brown, (Note: SECN was managed and part owned by a British consortium including Vickers and John Brown.) was of similar layout to the Hawthorn Leslie variant of the M-class destroyer. The British Director of Naval Construction objected to current British destroyer designs being sold to a foreign nation, but could not stop the sale.

The ships were 86.25 metres (283 ft) long overall and 83.82 metres (275 ft), with a beam of 8.23 metres (27 ft) and a draught of 4.57 metres (15 ft). Displacement was 1,060 tonnes (1,043 long tons) standard and 1,336 tonnes (1,315 long tons) full load. The ships were propelled by two geared steam turbines driving two shafts, and fed by four Yarrow water-tube boilerss, giving a distinctive four-funneled silhouette. This machinery gave the ships a design speed of 34 knots (63 km/h; 39 mph), although Alsedo did reach a speed of 37.2 knots (68.9 km/h; 42.8 mph) during trials before its armament was fitted. 276 tonnes (272 long tons) of oil was carried, giving a range of 1,500 nautical miles (2,800 km; 1,700 mi) at 15 knots (28 km/h; 17 mph). The ships had a crew of 86.

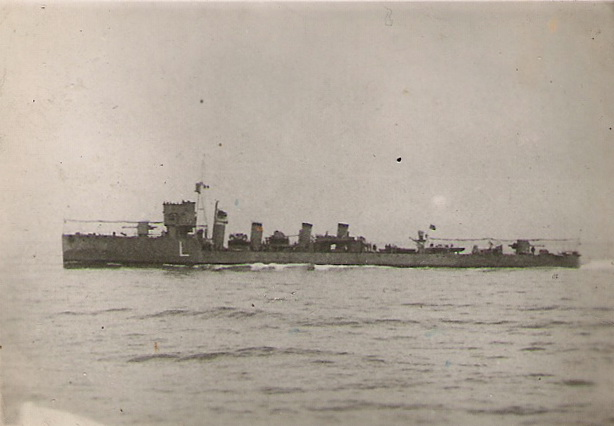
Lazaga

The ship's main gun armament consisted of three Vickers 4-inch (102 mm) guns (license-built in Spain) in three single mounts, with one forward, one aft the third gun between the second and third funnels, while two 47 mm anti-aircraft guns protected against air attack. (Note: While Whitley says that the anti-aircraft guns were 47 mm guns, Gardiner and Gray and Parkes says that they were 2-pounder (40 mm) guns.) The anti-aircraft guns were later replaced by four 20 mm cannon. Four 21-inch (533 mm) torpedo tubes were mounted in twin banks, with the class being the first Spanish destroyers to carry torpedoes of this size. Two depth charge throwers were fitted in about 1945. A rangefinder was mounted on the ship's bridge.

The First World War caused shortages of materials and equipment sourced from Britain, so the ships were not laid down until 1920. By this time, destroyer design had advanced, making the Alsedo class obsolete. Plans to build three more ships of the class were reconsidered; eventually, a modern and much larger design was selected, which became the Churruca class.

== History ==
The three destroyers were launched between 1922 and 1923, and commissioned between 1924 and 1925. In early 1926, Alsedo supported the transatlantic flight from Spain to Buenos Aires, Argentina, of a four-man Spanish Air Force crew led by pilot Major Ramón Franco—the brother of future Spanish caudillo Francisco Franco—and including copilot/navigator Captain Julio Ruiz de Alda Miqueleiz in the Dornier Do J Wal ("Whale") flying boat Plus Ultra ("Farther Still"). The seven-stage journey covered 1,429 miles (2,300 km) nonstop on 30 January 1926 from the Cape Verde Islands to Fernando de Noronha. To lighten the plane for the third and longest leg of their seven-stage flight, Alsedo transported one of the aviators along the route so that he could meet Plus Ultra when it arrived at Fernando de Noronha.

When the Spanish Civil War broke out in July 1936, Alsedo and Lazaga's crews sided with the Republican faction. Velasco, however, alongside at Ferrol, declared for the Nationalists and was damaged by Republican shelling before Ferrol fell to the Nationalists on 21 July.

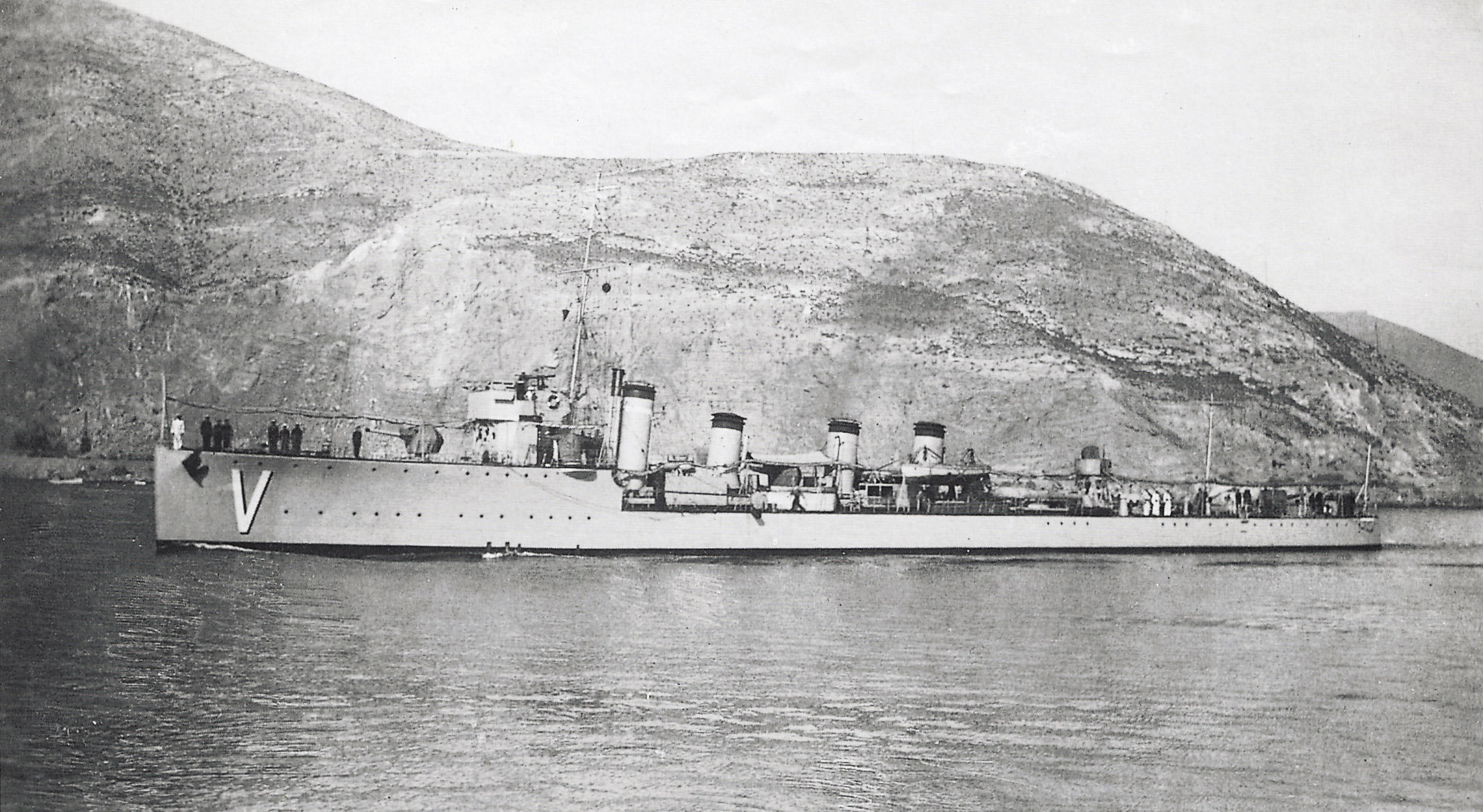
Velasco

Velasco was the only operational destroyer that sided with the Nationalists, until Italy transferred four old destroyers in 1937. This resulted in Velasco seeing heavy service, helping to sink the Republican submarine B6 on 19 September 1936, and taking part in the Battle of Cape Palos. The two Republican destroyers were mainly occupied by escort duties, with Lazaga towing the British destroyer HMS Hunter to safety when Hunter struck a mine off Almería in May 1937.

Following the end of the Spanish Civil War, all three destroyers served with the Spanish State. On 17 May 1943 Alsedo and Lazaga were damaged by a large fire at the naval base at Ferrol. The three destroyers continued to serve with the Spanish Navy until well into the 1950s, with Alsedo and Velasco being stricken in 1957 and Lazaga in 1961.

== Ships ==
Name	Laid down	Launched	Commissioned	Fate
Alsedo	1920	26 October 1922	1924	Stricken 1957
Lazaga (Originally Juan Lazaga)	June 1920	March 1924	1925	Stricken 1961
Velasco	1920	June 1923	1925	Stricken 1957

== Citations ==
=== Sources ===
- Beevor, Antony (1999). The Spanish Civil War. London: Cassell. ISBN 0-304-35281-0.
- Blackman, Raymond V. B., ed. (1960). Jane's Fighting Ships 1960–61. London: Sampson Low, Marston & Co Ltd.
- Friedman, Norman (2009). British Destroyers: From Earliest Days to the Second World War. Barnsley, UK: Seaforth Publishing. ISBN 978-1-84832-049-9.
- Gardiner, Robert; Gray, Randal (1985). Conway's All the World's Fighting Ships 1906–1921. London: Conway Maritime Press. ISBN 0-85177-245-5.
- Parkes, Oscar (1973) [Originally published 1931 by Sampson Low, Marston & Co.: London]. Jane's Fighting Ships. Newton Abbot, UK: David & Charles (Publishers). ISBN 0-7153-5849-9.
- Rohwer, Jürgen; Hümmelchen, Gerhard (1992). Chronology of the War at Sea 1939–1945. London: Greenhill Books. ISBN 1-85367-117-7.
- Whitley, M. J. (2000). Destroyers of World War Two: An International Encyclopedia. London: Cassell. ISBN 1-85409-521-8.
