= Spanish destroyer Bustamante =

Spanish destroyer of 1914–1931

History

Spain
- Name: Bustamante
- Namesake: José de Bustamante y Guerra (1759–1825), Spanish naval officer
- Operator: Spanish Navy
- Builder: Sociedad Española de Construcción Naval (SECN), Cartagena Spain
- Laid down: 25 August 1911
- Launched: 3 January 1913
- Commissioned: 23 March 1914
- Out of service: June 1931 (in reserve)
- Decommissioned: 20 October 1931
- Fate: Scrapped 1931

General characteristics
- Class & type: Bustamante-class destroyer
- Displacement: 530 long tons (540 t) normal
- Length: 64.7 m (212 ft 3 in)
- Beam: 6.7 m (22 ft 0 in)
- Draft: 1.7 m (5 ft 7 in)
- Propulsion: 3-shaft steam turbines, 6,250 shp (4,661 kW)
- Speed: 28 knots (52 km/h; 32 mph)
- Range: 900 nmi (1,700 km; 1,000 mi) at 15 knots (28 km/h; 17 mph)
- Complement: 70
- Armament: 5 × 57 mm (2.2 in) guns; 4 × 450 mm (17.7 in) torpedo tubes (2×2)

Bustamante was the lead ship of the Spanish Navy Bustamante-class destroyers. In commission from 1914 to 1931, she spent almost her entire service life under the Kingdom of Spain, seeing action in the Rif War. She briefly was part of the Spanish Republican Navy under the Second Spanish Republic before she was decommissioned.

The Spanish Navy named Bustamante in honor of José de Bustamante y Guerra (1759–1825), a Spanish naval officer who governed Guatemala and partnered with Alejandro Malaspina (1754–1810) to lead the Malaspina Expedition, an exploration of the Pacific Ocean of 1789–1794. For identification, she had a large white "B" painted on her bow.

== Construction and commissioning ==
The Spanish Minister of the Navy, Admiral José Ferrándiz y Niño, approved the Fleet Law of 1908 on 7 January 1908. It authorized the construction of the three Bustamante-class destroyers, as well as the three España-class battleships, six gunboats, and 22 torpedo boats.

The lead ship of the Bustamante class, Bustamante was laid down at the Sociedad Española de Construcción Naval (SECN; Spanish Shipbuilding Society) at Cartagena, Spain, on 25 August 1911. She was launched on 3 January 1913 and commissioned on 23 March 1914.

== Service history ==
=== 1914–1920 ===
Bustamante received her battle flag — paid for by subscription by the women of Cartagena — at Cartagena on 16 April 1914. From 1914 to 1916 she deployed on numerous occasions to the coast of Morocco and also conducted operations with the Training Squadron. On 8 November 1916, Bustamante, her sister ship Villaamil, and the destroyer Terror left either Ferrol or La Coruña, according to different sources, to join the squadron at Muros for maneuvers but were caught in a severe storm during the voyage. Villaamil reached Muros, but Bustamante was forced to put in at Ferrol. Terror did not reach port, and a number of ships, including the battleships España and Alfonso XIII, put to sea to search for her. Terror was found adrift in the Atlantic Ocean, disabled by an engine breakdown, and was towed to Ferrol.

On 27 July 1917, Bustamante, Villaamil, and the torpedo boats T-2 and T-8 rendezvoused off San Sebastián with the Spanish royal yacht Giralda as Giralda began a voyage to Santander with members of the Spanish royal family aboard. The warships escorted Giralda to Santander, which they reached the same day.

On 16 July 1919, Bustamente arrived at Santander. She subsequently steamed to San Sebastián, where King Alfonso XIII, Infante Alfonso, Prince Ferdinand of Bavaria, and other dignitaries came aboard. She then transported them to Santander, where she arrived on the afternoon of 25 July 1919.

The submarines Isaac Peral (A-0), Narcíso Monturiol (A-1), Cosme García (A-2), and A-3 and the protected cruiser Extremadura — operating as their submarine tender — arrived at Santander on 18 August 1919. While at Santander, the submarines put to sea under escort by Bustamante and the destroyer Proserpina on 22 August to conduct maneuvers off Cabo Mayor during the day with King Alfonso XIII aboard Narciso Monturiol.

During the annual regattas in the Cantabrian Sea along Spain's northern coast at the end of August 1920, Bustamante got underway from Bilbao to escort Queen Victoria Eugenie and the sloops participating in the regattas.

=== Rif War, 1921–1922 ===
The Rif War broke out in Spanish Morocco in 1921, pitting Spanish forces against Berber tribes in the Rif region. Bustamante deployed to the coast of North Africa in 1921 and carried out a number of operations before returning to Spain at the beginning of 1922, arriving at San Fernando to have her bottom cleaned at the Arsenal de La Carraca.

After the completion of the work at the shipyard, Bustamente returned to North Africa, arriving at Melilla on 15 February 1922. She departed Melilla on the afternoon of 30 March 1922 towing three motorboats carrying supplies, provisions, and ammunition and set course for Peñón de Alhucemas, an islet in the Alhucemas Islands where Riffian forces had besieged the Spanish garrison. Bustamante anchored near Peñón de Alhucemas shortly after midnight on 31 March 1922 and launched two eight-oared boats and one twelve-oared boat to expedite the disembarkation of the motorboats' cargo. Riffian forces ashore opened fire, but the Spaniards suffered no casualties during the operation. Bustamante got back underway to return to Melilla before dawn.

Bustamente escorted a supply convoy from Melilla to Peñón de Alhucemas in mid-April 1922, and during the same month she transported supplies to the besieged Spanish garrison of Peñón de Vélez de la Gomera, which at the time was an islet just off the North African coast, although a storm in 1930 created a peninsula that connected it to the mainland. In May 1922, Bustamante, the torpedo boat T-5, and other vessels attempted to escort a supply convoy from Melilla to Peñón de Alhucemas but had to return to Melilla due to bad weather. On 1 July 1922, Bustamante departed Melilla to transport Spanish Army General de brigada Brigadier General Federico Berenguer and members of his staff to Málaga. She had returned to Melilla by the second week of July 1922.

In mid-August 1922, Bustamante departed Melilla with the coastal patrol vessel Alcázar to escort a supply convoy to Peñón de Vélez de la Gomera. On the morning of 25 August 1922, she again got underway from Melilla to take up a station off Punta Afrau, where she was part of a squadron that also included Alfonso XIII, Alcázar, the armored cruiser Cataluña, the seaplane carrier Dédalo, the destroyer Audaz, the gunboats Recalde and Laya, and the coastal patrol vessel Martín. At the end of September 1922, Bustamante departed Melilla to transport the High Commissioner of Spain in Morocco, Ricardo Burguete, to Málaga. She returned to North Africa a few days later with her arrival at Ceuta.

At midnight on 7 October 1922, Bustamante, Cataluña, Audaz, Dédalo, the troopships Mediterráneo and Santa Teresa, and two fishing boats got underway from Ceuta bound for the M'Ter River, 5 nautical miles (9.3 km; 5.8 mi) east of Punta de Pescadores. At 05:00 on 8 October, the ships reached the river, where they rendezvoused with Coronel (Colonel) Alberto Castro Girona embarked aboard the gunboat Bonifaz. The ships then disembarked troops of the Spanish Foreign Legion and the Serrallo Regiment as well as engineers, pontooneers (engineers specializing in the construction of floating platforms and temporary bridges for amphibious landings and river crossings), and others onto the beach. By midday, all of the troops had disembarked and taken the Riffian positions. The ships remained anchored off the landing beach overnight and during the next day.

On 10 October 1922, Bustamante returned to Melilla after she, Alcázar, and the transport España No. 5 escorted a supply convoy to Peñón de Alhucemas and Peñón de Vélez de la Gomera. On the night of 20 October 1922, Bustamante and Dédalo departed Melilla as part of a squadron under the overall command of Vicealmirante (Vice Admiral) Juan Bautista Aznar-Cabañas. The rest of Aznar's squadron — Alfonso XIII, Audaz, Villaamil, Alcázar, and the destroyer Cadarso — got underway from Melilla shortly thereafter. Also taking part in the operation were the steamers Lázaro, carrying three companies and a platoon of infantry, and España No. 5, carrying a battalion of troops from Ceuta and a group of regulars from Tétouan. The squadron conducted a simulated amphibious landing off Cala Iris — a beach at Alhucemas — and left indigenous Moroccan troops to take up positions at M'Ter.

On the night of 25 October 1922, a squadron under Aznar's overall command consisting of 19 ships — Bustamante, Alfonso XIII, Cataluña, Cadarso, Villaamil, Bonifaz, Laya, Dédalo, two torpedo boats, the coastal patrol vessels Larache and Tetuán, the fuel tankers H-2 and H-3, and five smaller vessels — departed Melilla. The squadron simulated amphibious landings along the North African coast in the Bocoya inlet between Punta Bebazun and Cabo Quilates, at Sidi Dris, and at Afrau. The squadron bombarded Riffian positions at Sidi Dris and Afrau from 26 October 1922 onward.

A convoy scheduled to resupply the garrison on Peñón de Alhucemas was canceled because its escort vessels, which were to have included Bustamante, were engaged in the operations of Aznar's squadron. Late in October 1922, the convoy was reorganized and — composed of Bustamante, España No. 5, Alcázar, the water tanker Progreso, and three motorboats of the Compañía de Mar (Sea Company) — set out from Melilla for Peñón de Alhucemas, but it had to return to Melilla on the afternoon of 30 October because of bad weather. At the end of the first week of November 1922, Bustamante got underway from Melilla with Alcázar to escort a convoy composed of España No. 5 and four motor launches carrying a four-day supply of supplies and provisions to Peñón de Alhucemas and Peñón de Vélez de la Gomera. On 11 November 1922, Bustamante and Alcázar again departed Melilla to escort a supply convoy conisisting of España No. 5 and two tugs to Peñón de Alhucemas.

Accompanied by Dédalo, Bustamente left Melilla on 16 November 1922 and headed to the Arsenal de La Carraca at San Fernando to have her hull cleaned. Her sister ship Cadarso replaced her on convoy escort duty between Melilla, Peñón de Alhucemas, and Peñón de Vélez de la Gomera.

=== 1924–1931 ===
In Spain, Bustamante was assigned to duty with the Training Squadron. On the morning of 22 May 1924, the squadron — consisting of Bustamante, Alfonso XIII, Cadarso, Villaamil, and the battleship Jaime I — got underway from Cartagena to conduct gunnery exercises off Santa Pola. After completing the exercises, the squadron called at Valencia before arriving on 8 June 1924 in company with the light cruiser Reina Victoria Eugenia at Barcelona, where they rendezvoused with an Italian Regia Marina (Royal Navy) squadron visiting the port. The two battleships and three destroyers then visited the Balearic Islands before returning to Cartagena on 25 June 1924.

At 09:00 on 5 July 1924, the two battleships and three destroyers departed Barcelona to conduct maneuvers in the Gulf of Roses. After completing them, the ships proceeded to the Balearic Islands, where they visited Mahón on Menorca and Palma de Mallorca on Mallorca. They then stopped at Alicante before returning to Cartagena.

By 1925, Bustamante again had deployed to North Africa for operations in the Rif War. After departing the operations zone in the Alhucemas Islands, she arrived at Melilla on 21 October 1925. At the end of October 1925, she moved from Melilla to Tangier to patrol the North African coast from there. She returned to Spain at Cádiz on 5 December 1925. The Rif War came to an end in 1926.

Bustamante, the torpedo boats T-15 and T-16, and the gunboats Delfín and Vasco Núñez de Balboa arrrived at Sanlúcar de Barrameda on the afternoon of 12 August 1926. In 1929, Bustamente was part of a squadron that conducted maneuvers in the Mediterranean Sea, and when part of the squadron visited Barcelona for a crew rest period, she was the first to arrive, leading several torpedo boats into port on 16 October 1929.

On 14 April 1931, the Second Spanish Republic was proclaimed, replacing the Kingdom of Spain. The Spanish Navy came under the republic's control as the Spanish Republican Navy.

== Disposal ==
Bustamente was placed in reserve at Ferrol in mid-June 1931 with only half her crew aboard. She remained inactive thereafter, and was decommissioned on 20 October 1931. She was scrapped later that year.
