= Spanish destroyer Villaamil =

Spanish destroyer of 1916–1932

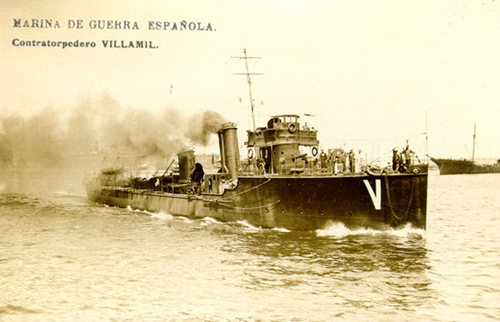
- Villaamil during her sea trials in 1916.

History

Spain
- Name: Villaamil
- Namesake: Fernando Villaamil Fernández-Cueto (1845–1898), Spanish naval officer
- Operator: Spanish Navy
- Builder: Sociedad Española de Construcción Naval (SECN), Cartagena Spain
- Laid down: 25 November 1912
- Launched: 10 December 1913
- Commissioned: 16 August 1916
- Decommissioned: Late 1932
- Fate: Scrapped 1932

General characteristics
- Class & type: Bustamante-class destroyer
- Displacement: 530 long tons (540 t) normal
- Length: 64.7 m (212 ft 3 in)
- Beam: 6.7 m (22 ft 0 in)
- Draft: 1.7 m (5 ft 7 in)
- Propulsion: 3-shaft steam turbines, 6,250 shp (4,661 kW)
- Speed: 28 knots (52 km/h; 32 mph)
- Range: 900 nmi (1,700 km; 1,000 mi) at 15 knots (28 km/h; 17 mph)
- Complement: 70
- Armament: 5 × 57 mm (2.2 in) guns; 4 × 450 mm (17.7 in) torpedo tubes (2×2)

Villaamil was a Spanish Navy Bustamante-class destroyer in commission from 1916 to 1932. She spent almost her entire service life under the Kingdom of Spain, seeing action in the Rif War of 1921–1926. She briefly was part of the Spanish Republican Navy under the Second Spanish Republic before her decommissioning.

The Spanish Navy named Villaamil in honor of Capitán de navio (Ship-of-the-Line Captain) Fernando Villaamil Fernández-Cueto (1845–1898), a Spanish naval officer who invented the modern destroyer concept. During the Spanish–American War he was killed in action aboard the destroyer Furor during the Battle of Santiago de Cuba on 3 July 1898, one of the highest-ranking Spanish officers to die in the conflict. For identification, she had a large white "V" painted on her bow.

== Construction and commissioning ==
The Spanish Minister of the Navy, Admiral José Ferrándiz y Niño, approved the Fleet Law of 1908 on 7 January 1908. It authorized the construction of the three Bustamante-class destroyers, as well as the three España-class battleships, six gunboats, and 22 torpedo boats.

The second ship of the Bustamante class, Villaamil was laid down at the Sociedad Española de Construcción Naval (SECN; Spanish Shipbuilding Society) at Cartagena, Spain, on 25 November 1912. She was launched on 10 December 1913 and commissioned on 16 August 1916.

== Service history ==
=== 1916–1920 ===
World War I had begun in the summer of 1914, and upon joining the Spanish fleet, Villaamil began patrols in Spanish waters to enforce Spain's neutrality during the conflict. On 8 November 1916, Villaamil, her sister ship Bustamante, and the destroyer Terror left either Ferrol or La Coruña, according to different sources, to join the squadron at Muros for maneuvers but were caught in a severe storm during the voyage. Villaamil reached Muros, but Bustamante was forced to turn back and put in at Ferrol. Terror did not reach port, and a number of ships, including the battleships España and Alfonso XIII, put to sea to search for her. Terror was found adrift in the Atlantic Ocean, disabled by an engine breakdown, and was towed to Ferrol.

On 27 July 1917, Villaamil, Bustamante, and the torpedo boats T-2 and T-8 rendezvoused off San Sebastián with the Spanish royal yacht Giralda as Giralda began a voyage to Santander with members of the Spanish royal family aboard. The warships escorted Giralda to Santander, which they reached the same day. By 28 July 1917, Villaamil had spent 100 days on neutrality enforcement patrols in Spanish waters since joining the fleet.

=== Rif War, 1921–1922 ===
The Rif War broke out in Spanish Morocco in 1921, pitting Spanish forces against Berber tribes in the Rif region. Villaamil deployed to the war zone on the coast of North Africa, and on 8 December 1921 arrived at the beach at Axdir, where she unloaded provisions, correspondence, and mattresses for prisoners of war. She returned to Spain at Cádiz on 9 December.

On the night of 20 October 1922, Bustamante and the seaplane carrier Dédalo departed Melilla as part of a squadron under the overall command of Vicealmirante (Vice Admiral) Juan Bautista Aznar-Cabañas. The rest of Aznar's squadron — Alfonso XIII, Villaamil, the destroyers Audaz and Cadarso, and the coastal patrol vessel Alcázar — got underway from Melilla shortly thereafter. Also taking part in the operation were the steamers Lázaro, carrying three companies and a platoon of infantry, and España No. 5, carrying a battalion of troops from Ceuta and a group of Regulares from Tétouan. The squadron conducted a simulated amphibious landing off Cala Iris — a beach at Alhucemas — and left indigenous Moroccan troops to take up positions at M'Ter.

On the night of 25 October 1922, a squadron under Aznar's overall command consisting of 19 ships — Villaamil, Alfonso XIII, Bustamante, Cadarso, Dédalo, the armored cruiser Cataluña, the gunboats Bonifaz and Laya, two torpedo boats, the coastal patrol vessels Larache and Tetuán, the fuel tankers H-2 and H-3, and five smaller vessels — departed Melilla. The squadron simulated amphibious landings along the North African coast in the Bocoya inlet between Punta Bebazun and Cabo Quilates, at Sidi Dris, and at Afrau. The squadron bombarded Riffian positions at Sidi Dris and Afrau from 26 October 1922 onward.

=== 1923–1932 ===
With King Alfonso XIII observing from aboard Villaamil, the Spanish Navy's submarine flotilla conducted maneuvers in the Mediterranean Sea off Cartagena in March 1923. To mark the feast day of the papal coronation of the statue of the Virgen de los Desamparados (Our Lady of the Forsaken) on 12 May 1923, festivities took place in Valencia with Alfonso XIII, Queen Victoria Eugenie, and numerous dignitaries in attendance. Villaamil, the battleship España, the gunboat Álvaro de Bazán, the torpedo boats No. 21 and No. 22, and the submarine B-3 were in port for the event.

King Alfonso XIII, Queen Victoria Eugenie, and Prime Minister Miguel Primo de Rivera embarked on the battleship Jaime I on 15 November 1923 and departed for Italy on 16 November accompanied by the Trasmediterránea mail steamer Rey Jaime I — which was carrying the royal entourage — and escorted by Villaamil, Cadarso, the battleship Alfonso XIII, the light cruiser Reina Victoria Eugenia, and the submarines B-1, B-2, B-3, and B-4. The royal family disembarked at La Spezia, Italy. The squadron anchored at Naples, Italy, on 21 November. After the completion of the royal visit, the squadron returned to Spain, arriving at Barcelona on 1 December and at Cartagena on 14 December 1923.

In Spain, Villaamil was assigned to duty with the Training Squadron. On the morning of 22 May 1924, the squadron — consisting of Villaamil, Alfonso XIII, Jaime I, Bustamante, and Cadarso — got underway from Cartagena to conduct gunnery exercises off Santa Pola. After completing the exercises, the squadron called at Valencia before arriving on 8 June 1924 at Barcelona, where they rendezvoused with Reina Victoria Eugenia, the troopship Contramaestre Casado, and an Italian Regia Marina (Royal Navy) squadron visiting the port. Sources provide conflicting accounts of the squadron's subsequent activities. According to one, the two battleships and three destroyers departed Barcelona and visited the Balearic Islands before returning to Cartagena on 25 June 1924. According to another, the ships remained at Barcelona until 29 June and then proceeded to Cartagena.

At 09:00 on 5 July 1924, Villaamil, Alfonso XIII, Jaime I, Bustamante, and Cadarso departed Barcelona to conduct maneuvers in the Gulf of Roses. After completing them, the ships proceeded to the Balearic Islands, where they visited Mahón on Menorca and Palma de Mallorca on Mallorca. They then stopped at Alicante before returning to Cartagena.

Capitán de corbeta (Lieutenant Commander) Salvador Moreno Fernández — a future almirante (admiral) and minister of the navy — became the commanding officer of Villaamil on 11 January 1925. Under his command, Villaamil arrived at Palma de Mallorca on 19 March 1925, which a British Royal Navy squadron was visiting at the time. Cadarso also was at Palma de Mallorca during the British visit. Villaamil later returned to Cartagena. Moreno Fernández relinquished command on 10 November 1925.

Villaamil arrived at Ferrol in early October 1927. Several officers were aboard to conduct gunnery training at the naval firing range.

At the end of March 1929, the Spanish Navy formed a squadron to serve at the Janer gunnery range at Marín. It consisted of Villaamil, the torpedo boats T-1 and T-3, the coastal patrol vessel Uad Martín, and the tug Ferrolano. Villaamil spent the rest of her active service life providing services at the gunnery range.

On 14 April 1931, the Second Spanish Republic was proclaimed, replacing the Kingdom of Spain. The Spanish Navy came under the republic's control as the Spanish Republican Navy.

== Disposal ==
The last of the Bustamente-class destroyers in service, Villaamil was decommissioned and stricken from the naval register in the latter part of 1932. She was scrapped that year.
