= Spanish destroyer Cadarso =

Spanish destroyer of 1916–1932

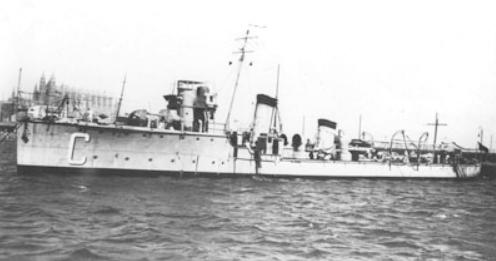

History

Spain
- Name: Requesens
- Namesake: Luis de Requesens y Zúñiga (1528–1576), victorious naval leader at the Battle of Lepanto in 1571
- Renamed: Cadarso
- Namesake: Luis Cadarso y Rey de Andrade (1843–1898), Spanish naval officer
- Operator: Spanish Navy
- Builder: Sociedad Española de Construcción Naval (SECN), Cartagena Spain
- Laid down: 24 September 1913
- Launched: 24 September 1914
- Commissioned: 25 August 1917
- Decommissioned: September 1930
- Fate: Scrapped 1930

General characteristics
- Class & type: Bustamante-class destroyer
- Displacement: 530 long tons (540 t) normal
- Length: 64.7 m (212 ft 3 in)
- Beam: 6.7 m (22 ft 0 in)
- Draft: 1.7 m (5 ft 7 in)
- Propulsion: 3-shaft steam turbines, 6,250 shp (4,661 kW)
- Speed: 28 knots (52 km/h; 32 mph)
- Range: 900 nmi (1,700 km; 1,000 mi) at 15 knots (28 km/h; 17 mph)
- Complement: 70
- Armament: 5 × 57 mm (2.2 in) guns; 4 × 450 mm (17.7 in) torpedo tubes (2×2)

Cadarso was a Spanish Navy Bustamante-class destroyer in commission from 1917 to 1930. She served under the Kingdom of Spain, seeing action in the Rif War of 1921–1926.

The Spanish Navy originally intended to name the ship Requesens, after Luis de Requesens y Zúñiga (1528–1576), a Spanish general, sailor, diplomat, and politician who as the lieutenant-general and chief adviser to John of Austria effectively was in command of the Holy League fleet in its victory at the Battle of Lepanto in 1571. He later was governor of the Duchy of Milan from 1572 to 1573 and governor of the Spanish Netherlands from 1573 to 1576).

At some point prior to her commissioning, however, the ship was renamed Cadarso in honor of Capitán de navio (Ship-of-the-Line Captain) Luis Cadarso y Rey de Andrade (1843–1898), a Spanish naval officer killed in action during the Spanish–American War while in command of the unprotected cruiser Reina Cristina during the Battle of Manila Bay on 1 May 1898. For identification, she had a large white "C" painted on her bow.

== Construction and commissioning ==
The Spanish Minister of the Navy, Admiral José Ferrándiz y Niño, approved the Fleet Law of 1908 on 7 January 1908. It authorized the construction of the three Bustamante-class destroyers, as well as the three España-class battleships, six gunboats, and 22 torpedo boats.

The third and final ship of the Bustamante class, Cadarso was laid down at the Sociedad Española de Construcción Naval (SECN; Spanish Shipbuilding Society) at Cartagena, Spain, on 24 September 1913. She was launched on 24 September 1914 and commissioned on 25 August 1917.

== Service history ==
=== 1917–1920 ===
World War I had begun in the summer of 1914, and upon joining the Spanish fleet, Cadarso patrolled extensively in Spanish waters to enforce Spain's neutrality during the conflict, which ended in November 1918. On 4 August 1920, Cadarso made a voyage from Ferrol to Santander, where she remained for several days while King Alfonso XIII and Queen Victoria Eugenie visited the city.

=== Rif War, 1921–1923 ===
The Rif War broke out in Spanish Morocco in 1921, pitting Spanish forces against Berber tribes in the Rif region. Carrying a cargo of ammunition for Spanish naval vessels operating in the conflict, Cadarso arrived at Melilla on the coast of North Africa on 1 September 1921. After departing Melilla, she arrived at the Arsenal de La Carraca in San Fernando on the morning of 20 September 1921. She loaded more ammunition and transported it to the war zone for transfer to the steamer Jorge Juan. Cadarso got underway from Melilla on 22 September 1921 bound for Cádiz. On 17 June 1922, she departed Cádiz bound for Larache and Alcazarquivir in Spanish Morocco with the chief of the Spanish Marine Infantry, General de división (Division General) José Ignacio de Carranza y Fernández Reguera, aboard. After arriving in North Africa, he inspected the personnel of the Marine Infantry expeditionary regiment.

On the night of 20 October 1922, the destroyer Bustamante and the seaplane carrier Dédalo departed Melilla as part of a squadron under the overall command of Vicealmirante (Vice Admiral) Juan Bautista Aznar-Cabañas. The rest of Aznar's squadron — Cadarso, the battleship Alfonso XIII, the destroyers Audaz and Villaamil, and the coastal patrol vessel Alcázar — got underway from Melilla shortly thereafter. Also taking part in the operation were the steamers Lázaro, carrying three companies and a platoon of infantry, and España No. 5, carrying a battalion of troops from Ceuta and a group of Regulares from Tétouan. The squadron conducted a simulated amphibious landing off Cala Iris — a beach at Alhucemas — and left indigenous Moroccan troops to take up positions at M'Ter.

On the night of 25 October 1922, a squadron under Aznar's overall command consisting of 19 ships — Cadarso, Alfonso XIII, Bustamante, Villaamil, Dédalo, the armored cruiser Cataluña, the gunboats Bonifaz and Laya, two torpedo boats, the coastal patrol vessels Larache and Tetuán, the fuel tankers H-2 and H-3, and five smaller vessels — departed Melilla. The squadron simulated amphibious landings along the North African coast in the Bocoya inlet between Punta Bebazun and Cabo Quilates, at Sidi Dris, and at Afrau. The squadron bombarded Riffian positions at Sidi Dris and Afrau from 26 October 1922 onward.

On 16 November 1922, Bustamante, accompanied by Dédalo, departed Melilla and headed to the Arsenal de La Carraca at San Fernando to have her hull cleaned and Cadarso replaced her on convoy escort duty along the North African coast between Melilla, Peñón de Alhucemas in the Alhucemas Islands, and Peñón de Vélez de la Gomera. That day, Cadarso steamed from Melilla to Punta Mayorga before returning to Melilla. On 18 November, she received orders to escort a convoy made up of Larache, the steamer España No. 5, and several tugs to Peñón de Alhucemas. On the night of 19 November 1922 she departed Melilla with a convoy bound for Peñón de Alhucemas with the patrol vessel Arcila and two tugs.

On the morning of 21 August 1923, a squadron under the command of Vicealmirate (Vice Admiral) José Rivera y Álvarez de Canero consisting of Cadarso, Alfonso XIII (Rivera's flagship), Alcázar, Bonifaz, the battleship España, the protected cruiser Reina Regente, the gunboat Lauria, and other, smaller vessels arrived off Alhucemas. Five thousand Moorish troops who had boarded the troopship España No. 5 early that morning made an amphibious landing at Afrau, while Alcázar and Lauria bombarded several Riffian positions near the landing site and Alfonso XIII and España shelled Riffian forces at Alhucemas. Once ashore, the troops advanced in three columns to relieve Spanish forces besieged by the Riffians at Tifaruin. More troops arrived on 23 August, and that day Cadarso, with 48 wounded men aboard, returned to Melilla accompanied by Lauria.

=== 1923–1930 ===
King Alfonso XIII, Queen Victoria Eugenie, and Prime Minister Miguel Primo de Rivera embarked on the battleship Jaime I on 15 November 1923 and departed for Italy on 16 November accompanied by the Trasmediterránea mail steamer Rey Jaime I — which was carrying the royal entourage — and escorted by Cadarso, Villaamil, the battleship Alfonso XIII, the light cruiser Reina Victoria Eugenia, and the submarines B-1, B-2, B-3, and B-4. The royal family disembarked at La Spezia, Italy. The squadron anchored at Naples, Italy, on 21 November. After the completion of the royal visit, the squadron returned to Spain, arriving at Barcelona on 1 December and at Cartagena on 14 December 1923.

In Spain, Cadarso was assigned to duty with the Training Squadron. On the morning of 22 May 1924, the squadron — consisting of Cadarso, Alfonso XIII, Jaime I, Bustamante, and Villaamil — got underway from Cartagena to conduct gunnery exercises off Santa Pola. After completing the exercises, the squadron called at Valencia before arriving on 8 June 1924 at Barcelona, where they rendezvoused with Reina Victoria Eugenia, the troopship Contramaestre Casado, and an Italian Regia Marina (Royal Navy) squadron visiting the port. Sources provide conflicting accounts of the squadron's subsequent activities. According to one, the two battleships and three destroyers departed Barcelona and visited the Balearic Islands before returning to Cartagena on 25 June 1924. According to another, the ships remained at Barcelona until 29 June and then proceeded to Cartagena.

At 09:00 on 5 July 1924, Cadarso, Alfonso XIII, Jaime I, Bustamante, and Villaamil departed Barcelona to conduct maneuvers in the Gulf of Roses. After completing them, the ships proceeded to the Balearic Islands, where they visited Mahón on Menorca and Palma de Mallorca on Mallorca. They then stopped at Alicante before returning to Cartagena.

Cadarso arrived at Palma de Mallorca on 19 March 1925, which a British Royal Navy squadron was visiting at the time. Villaamil also was at Palma de Mallorca during the British visit. Cadarso returned to Cartagena on 12 April 1925. With the Rif War dragging on, she arrived at Algeciras on 31 August 1925 and joined the squadron which conducted the Alhucemas landing on the North African coast on 8 September 1925. The Rif War ended in 1926.

Cadarso participated in squadron maneuvers in the Mediterranean Sea in 1929 that began in mid-September and concluded in October. During the maneuivers, she provided communications and navigation support to torpedo boats and seaplanes.

== Disposal ==
Decommissioned in September 1930, Cadarso was the first of the Bustamente-class destroyers to be retired. She was scrapped later that year and officially stricken from the navy list by the end of the year.
