= Cadarso =

Cadarso may refer to:

- Luis Cadarso y Rey de Andrade (1843–1898), Spanish naval officer
- Spanish ship Cadarso, more than one Spanish Navy ship
