= Audaz =

Audaz may refer to:

- Audaz (wrestler) (born 1997), Mexican wrestler
- Spanish ship Audaz, several Spanish Navy ships
- Audaz-class destroyer, a class of Spanish Navy destroyers
- C.D. Audaz, Salvadoran association football club

== See also ==
- C.D. Atlético Audaz, Ecuadoran association football club
- C.D. Audaz Octubrino, Ecuadoran association football club
