= Spanish ship Cadarso =

Two ships of the Spanish Navy have been named Cadarso, for Luis Cadarso y Rey de Andrade (1843–1898), a Spanish naval officer killed in the Battle of Manila Bay in 1898:

- Cadarso, a Bustamante-class destroyer in commission from 1917 to 1930.
- Cadarso, a Lazaga-class patrol vessel in commission from 1976 to 1993.
