= Spanish ship Ariete =

Various Spanish Navy ships

Two ships of the Spanish Navy have borne the name Ariete, meaning Battering Ram:

- Ariete, an Ariete-class torpedo boat commissioned in 1887 and destroyed by fire in 1905.
- Ariete (D-36), an Audaz-class destroyer commissioned in 1961 and wrecked in 1966.
