= Lobo =

Lobo may refer to:

== Places ==
- Lobo, Batangas, a municipality in the Philippines
- Lobo, Texas, a ghost town
- Lobo, Indonesia
- Lobo, Cameroon, a town in Cameroon
- Lobo Hill, near Belchite, Aragon, Spain
- Lobo, Ontario, near London, Ontario, Canada

== People ==
- Lobo (surname), a family name
- Lobo (Dutch singer), Imrich Lobo (1955–2025), Dutch pop and calypso singer
- Lobo (musician) (born 1943), Roland Kent LaVoie, American singer-songwriter
- Lobo (wrestler) (born 1975), Joseph Eubanks, American professional wrestler
- Lobo Ismail (born 1974), Jordanian singer
- Mikel Lejarza (born 1947), code name "El Lobo", Spanish intelligence service operative
- Mr. Lobo (born 1970), American horror host
- Ranjit Singh Lobo and Manjit Singh Lobo, fictional characters in the 1981 Indian film Bulundi

== Arts and entertainment ==
=== Films ===
- Lobo, an alternative name for the 1932 film Trailing the Killer
- El Lobo, the original Spanish title of the 2004 film The Wolf

=== Music ===
- Los Lobos, an American rock band

Also see "Lobo" in the People section.

=== Television ===
- The Misadventures of Sheriff Lobo (later just Lobo), a 1979–1981 series on NBC
- Lobo (TV series), a 2008 Filipino series
- Lobo, a 2000 adult animated black comedy web series based on the DC Comics antihero of the same name

=== Literature ===
- Lobo, a 1972 book of poetry by William Childress

=== Fictional characters ===
- Lobo (character), a superhuman anti-hero published by DC Comics
- Lobo (Dell Comics), a Western comic book character considered the first African-American to star in his own book
- The title character of 1962 Disney film The Legend of Lobo
- The title character of "Lobo the King of Currumpaw", a story by Ernest Thompson Seton
- Lobo the Big Bad Wolf/Grim Reaper a character from "DreamWorks The Last Wish 2"

== College sports ==
- New Mexico Lobos, the athletics team of University of New Mexico
  - Lobo (mascot), a University of New Mexico mascot
- Sul Ross State Lobos, the athletics team of Sul Ross State University

== Other uses ==
- Lobo, Mexican wolf (Canis lupus baileyi)
- LOBO, a common acronym for lender option borrower option, a long-term financial product available in the UK
- Lobo, a cultivar of apple from Canada
- Lobo, an alternative name for Zambo in the racial classification of colonial Mexico
- Ford Lobo, an alternative name for the Ford F-150 marketed in Mexico
- Hafei Lobo, a hatchback sold in China
- Lobo Systems, manufacturer of the Max-80 personal computer
- Lobo, the word for wolf in Brazilian Portuguese and Spanish
- Spanish ship Almirante Lobo, more than one Spanish Navy ship
