= Ariete (disambiguation) =

The Ariete is an Italian main battle tank.

Ariete may also refer to:

- Ariete (singer) (born 2002), Italian singer and songwriter
- 132nd Armored Division "Ariete", a disbanded Italian Army unit
- Armored Brigade "Ariete", an active Italian Army unit
- Aerfer Ariete, a prototype fighter aircraft from the 1950s
- Ariete-class torpedo boat, destroyer escorts of the Italian Navy during World War II
- Reggiane Re.2002 Ariete, World War II Italian fighter aircraft
- Spanish ship Ariete, several ships

== See also ==
- Arriete-Ciego Montero, a Cuban village
