= Spanish transport Almirante Lobo (A-41) =

Spanish Navy transport of 1954–1977

History

Spain
- Name: Torrelaguna
- Namesake: Torrelaguna, a municipality of Spain
- Builder: Echevarrieta y Larrinaga/Astilleros de Cádiz, Cádiz, Spain
- Yard number: 40
- Laid down: 19 October 1948
- Acquired: June 1952 (by Spanish Navy)
- Cost: 50,500,000 pesetas
- Renamed: Almirante Lobo, 26 May 1953
- Namesake: Miguel Lobo y Malagamba (1821–1875), Spanish admiral
- Launched: 23 September 1953
- Commissioned: 16 September 1954
- Decommissioned: 30 April 1977
- Identification: Pennant number A-41
- Fate: Scrapped

General characteristics
- Type: Transport
- Tonnage: 3,701 gross register tons
- Displacement: 6,897 tons (standard); 8,039 tons (full load)
- Length: 111.38 m (365 ft 5 in) (loa); 105 m (344 ft 6 in) (lbp)
- Beam: 14.36 m (47 ft 1 in)
- Draft: 6.90 m (22 ft 8 in) (maximum)
- Depth: 7.82 m (25 ft 8 in)
- Installed power: 1,800 hp (1,342 kW)
- Propulsion: One Lentz 4-cylinder double compound steam engine, two LaMont boilers, one shaft
- Speed: 12 knots (22 km/h; 14 mph)
- Range: 7,000 nmi (13,000 km; 8,100 mi) at 10 knots (19 km/h; 12 mph)
- Complement: 100 to 112

Almirante Lobo (A-41) was a transport of the Spanish Navy in commission from 1954 to 1977. The second Spanish Navy ship to bear the name, she was named for Contralmirante (Counter Admiral) Miguel Lobo y Malagamba (1821-1876), a prominent naval figure in 19th-century Spain who participated in the Battle of Callao in 1866 during the Chincha Islands War and commanded the central government fleet in the Battle of Portmán in 1873 during the Cantonal Rebellion.

== Design ==
Almirante Lobo was 111.38 metres (365 ft 5 in) long and had a beam of 14.36 metres (47 ft 1 in), a draft of 6.90 metres (22 ft 8 in), and a depth of hull of 7.82 metres (25 ft 8 in). Her standard displacement was 6,897 tons, and at full load she displaced 8,039 tons. Her two LaMont water-tube boilers fed her Lentz double compound steam engine, which generated 1,800 horsepower (1,342 kilowatts) and drove her single screw, giving her a maximum speed of 12 knots (22 km/h; 14 mph). She had a range of 7,000 nautical miles (13,000 km; 8,100 mi) at 10 knots (19 km/h; 12 mph). Her crew ranged in size from 100 to 112 men. The Francoist regime's policy of economic autarky resulted in Spain relying on coal for energy in the mid-20th century, and many Spanish ships of the era used coal as fuel — an anachronism elsewhere by the mid-20th century. Almirante Lobo′s propulsion system thus was designed to burn coal.

== Construction and commissioning ==
During the 1940s, Spain's state-owned shipping corporation, the Empresa Nacional Elcano de la Marina Mercante (National Elcano Merchant Marine Company) launched its Plan de Nuevas Construcciones (New Construction Plan), intended to rebuild and modernize Spain's merchant marine after the destruction wrought by the Spanish Civil War of 1936–1939. As part of this plan, Empresa Nacional Elcano created a number of standardized blueprints for merchant ships based on their intended design, cargo capacity, and trade routes. Among these was the "Type B" ship, a standardized passenger-cargo ship with a crew of 41 and accommodation for six passengers. In July 1945, the Compañía Ibero-Americana de Navegación (Ibero-American Navigation Company) took delivery of the prototype Type B ship, SS Santo Domingo, from the Echevarrieta y Larrinaga shipyard at Cádiz, Spain.

The Empresa Nacional Elcano ordered the construction of two more Type B ships from Echevarrieta y Larrinaga, to be named Torremolinos and Torrelaguna. Echevarrieta y Larrinaga laid down Torremolinos in April 1945, but the devastating Cádiz explosion, which occurred at an adjacent submarine base on the evening of 18 August 1947, almost completely destroyed the shipyard, badly damaging the unfinished Torremolinos and the materials assembled for the construction of Torrelaguna and delaying the construction of both ships.

The Compañía Chilena de Navegación Interoceánica (Chilean Interoceanic Navigation Company) purchased Torremolinos while she was still on the slipway, renamed her SS Ancud, and took delivery of her in February 1953. Meanwhile, Echevarrieta y Larrinaga laid the keel of Torrelaguna on 19 October 1948, assigning her the yard number 40. The shipyard struggled to reestablish itself after the 1947 explosion, and in June 1952 the Spanish state-owned financing and industrial holding company Instituto Nacional de Industria (National Institute of Industry, or INI) bought the shipyard from Horacio Echevarrieta and established a new company, Astilleros de Cádiz (Cádiz Shipyards), to carry on its work.

In June 1952, while Torrelaguna was still on the slipway, the Minister of the Navy, Almirante (Admiral) Salvador Moreno Fernández, authorized the acquisition of Torrelaguna by the Spanish Navy and her modification into a collier to support ships of the Spanish fleet that used coal as fuel. By a decree of 7 November 1952, the Spanish government approved and formalized the purchase of the ship for the price of 50.5 million pesetas. On 26 May 1953 the ship was renamed Almirante Lobo. Almirante Lobo was launched on 23 September 1953. While she was fitting out, a government decree authorized that her boilers be converted to burn fuel oil rather than coal, a modification that cost an additional 2.8 million pesetas. The Spanish Navy then ordered additional changes that converted her from a collier into a multipurpose transport. She finally was delivered to the Spanish Navy on 16 September 1954.

== Service history ==
Soon after Almirante Lobo entered service, her crew began to experience problems with her propulsion system. In 1955, inspections revealed — and technical reports prepared by Spanish Navy personnel described — steam leaks and frequent engine breakdowns, leading to the ship often undergoing repairs. The Spanish Navy considered replacing Almirante Lobo′s steam propulsion system with a diesel engine — a modification eventually made to her sister ship Ancud in 1969 — but rejected the idea. Instead, the Spanish Navy opted to retain her boilers and steam engine, and in October 1956 began to study modifications to her propulsion system that might improve its reliability and performance. However, problems with her boilers and steam engine would continue to plague Almirante Lobo throughout her service life, limiting her availability for operations.

On 20 September 1955, a Spanish Navy squadron under the command of Vicealmirante (Vice Admiral) Felipe José Abárzuza y Oliva began maneuvers in the Mediterranean Sea. The squadron included Almirante Lobo, the heavy cruiser Canarias (Abárzuza's flagship), the light cruisers Almirante Cervera, Miguel de Cervantes, and Galicia, the anti-aircraft cruiser Méndez Núñez, the destroyers Audaz and Osado, twelve older destroyers, the corvettes Atrevida and Descubierta, the minesweepers Llobregat and Nalón, the net tender CR-1, and the ocean-going tug RA-1. The squadron arrived at Barcelona on the morning of 4 October for a visit by the Spanish head of state, Generale (General) Francisco Franco. Franco boarded Canarias on 8 October to observe the squadron's maneuvers. The squadron departed Barcelona on the night of 8 October and proceeded to the Balearic Islands.

In late April 1963, Almirante Lobo was one of several ships from the Northern Naval Group that arrived at Vigo to conduct maneuvers. The maneuvers, which began in May and also included the frigate Legazpi, the minelayers Júpiter, Neptuno and Vulcano, and the minesweepers Almanzora, Miño, Odiel, Sil, and Turia, involved the amphibious warfare exercise "Pato I" in the Cíes Islands off Pontevedra, conducted to train midshipmen from the Naval Military Academy.

Almirante Lobo got underway from Cádiz on 22 April 1964 to conduct maneuvers south of the city as part of an amphibious warfare force. Galicia, Audaz, Atrevida, Legazpi, the destroyers Álava and Meteoro, the frigate Vicente Yáñez Pinzón, the corvettes Diana, Nautilus, Princesa, and Villa de Bilbao, the minelayer Marte, three medium landing ships, the oiler Teide, the tug RA-5, and the motor vessel Ciudad de Sevilla also took part.

On 20 April 1971, Spanish warships began to concentrate at Las Palmas on Gran Canaria in the Canary Islands to carry out maneuvers called "Operation Trinca-71." Almirante Lobo participated in the maneuvers, which took place off Fuerteventura from 23 to 26 April 1971. Atrevida, Nautilus, Princesa, Villa de Bilbao, the destroyers Almirante Valdés, Almirante Ferrándiz, and Jorge Juan, the frigate Hernán Cortés, the attack transports Aragón and Castilla, the medium landing ships LSM-1 and LSM-2, and the landing craft BDK-1, BDK-3, BDK-4, BDK-5, BDK-6, BDK-7, and BDK-8 also took part.

== Disposal ==
A disappointment because of her chronic propulsion problems, Almirante Lobo was decommissioned on 30 April 1977. She subsequently was sold and scrapped.
