= Steam gun boat =

1941 class of British steam gunboats

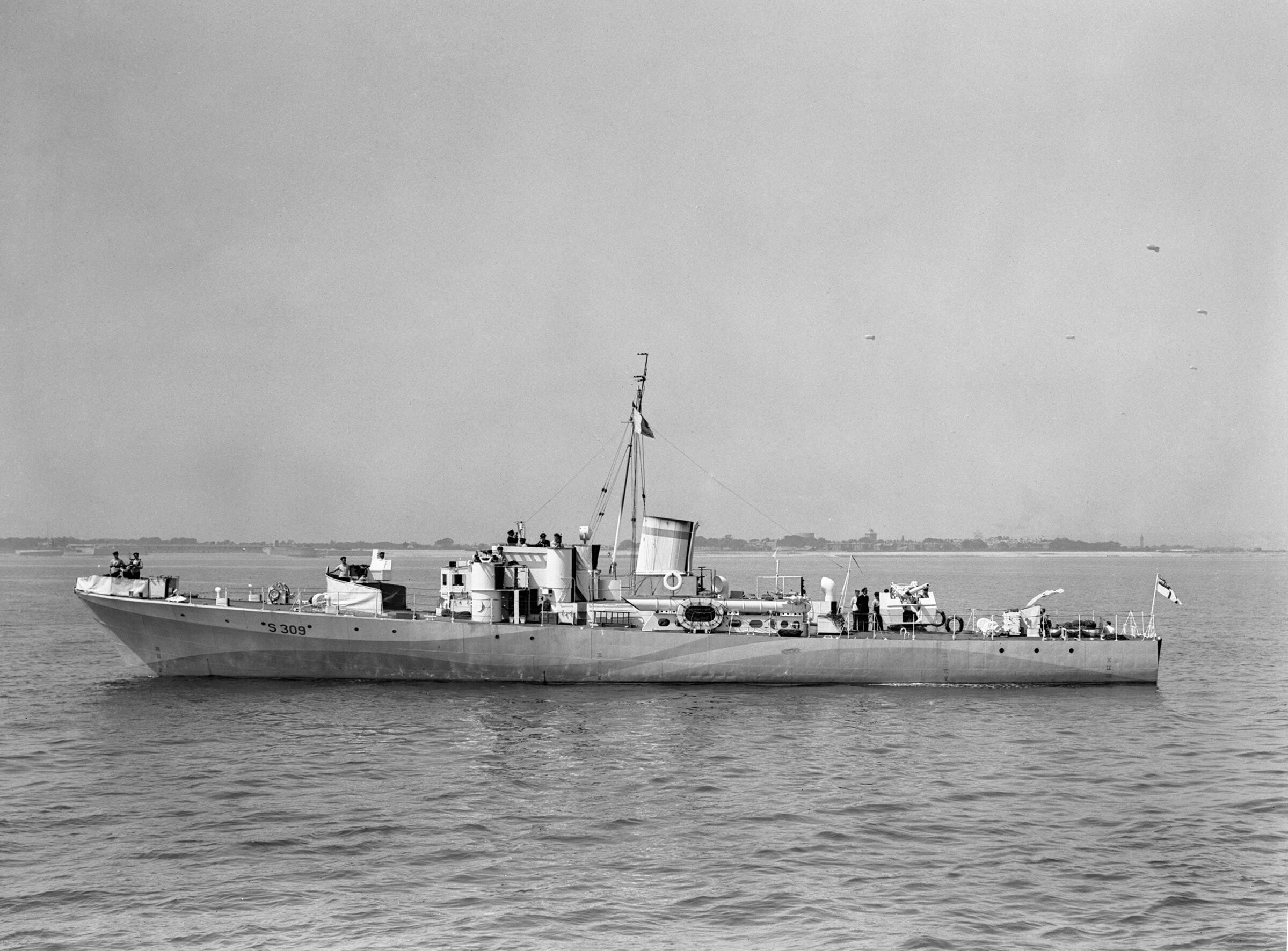
- Grey Goose

Class overview
- Name: Steam gun boat (SGB)
- Operators: RN
- Built: 1940–1942
- In service: Nov 1941- post-war
- Planned: 52
- Completed: 7
- Canceled: 2
- Lost: 1

General characteristics
- Displacement: 175 tons (standard), 255 tons (deep load)
- Length: 44.3 m (145 ft 8 in) overall
- Beam: 6.1 m (20 ft)
- Draught: 1.68 m (5 ft 6 in)
- Installed power: 8,000 shp (5,965 kW)
- Propulsion: 1 × LaMont boiler; 2 × Metropolitan-Vickers geared Steam turbines; 2 × shafts
- Speed: 35 kn (65 km/h) maximum
- Range: 200 NM (370 km) at full speed; 900 NM (1,700 km) at 12 knots
- Complement: Initially: 27 (3 officers and 24 men); Later: 34 (as a result of changes in armament)
- Armament: Final arrangement: 1 × 3-in (76.2 mm) gun; 2 × single 6-pdr guns; 2 × twin 20-mm Oerlikon cannon; 2 × 21-inch torpedo tubes

Steam gun boats (SGBs) were small Royal Navy vessels built from 1940 to 1942 for Coastal Forces during World War II. The class consisted of nine steam-powered torpedo boats combining aspects of both motor torpedo boats and motor gun boats while being twice as large vessels.

They were developed in parallel with the 35-metre long Fairmile D motor torpedo boats ("dog boats"), specifically due to the need to hunt down German E-boats at a time of scarcity of suitable diesel engines. While sixty were planned, only an initial batch of nine were ordered on 8 November 1940, of which seven were completed.

== Design ==
The steam gun boats were conceived to answer the seeming need for a craft which was large enough to put to sea in rough weather and which could operate both as a "super-gunboat" and a torpedo carrier, combining the functions of the motor gunboat (MGB) and motor torpedo boat (MTB) in the same fashion as did the German E-boats. The Admiralty wanted Denny to produce a design that was suitable for pre-fabrication construction to enable large numbers to be built.

They were the largest of the Coastal Forces vessels, and were the only ones to be built of steel (to meet the fast production requirement – all other Coastal Forces craft were of wood). They resembled a miniature destroyer, and were perhaps the most graceful of all the craft produced during the Second World War. However their comparatively large silhouette was a drawback, making them too easy a target for the faster German craft.

They were 145 ft 8 in (44.40 m) long and had a displacement of 172 tons (202 tons fully fuelled). They were powered by two 4,000 shp (2,983 kW) Metropolitan-Vickers geared steam turbines using special LaMont boilers. These boilers proved to be particularly vulnerable to attack and – once the vessel had broken down – required a major effort to repair. Steam had the advantage of quietness but demanded a large hull. Large wooden hulls were not feasible for mass production, so steel was used. This meant hulls and machinery were beyond the scope of the small yards engaged in the rapid expansion of the coastal forces, and the SGB thus competed for berths in yards already hard put to produce urgently required convoy escorts. Also they competed in the demand for mild steel and steam power plants against the more urgently demanded destroyers; accordingly the planned 51 further vessels were not ordered, and the two units ordered from Thornycroft were not completed after air-raid damage. The seven vessels constructed were built by Yarrow, Hawthorn Leslie, J. Samuel White and William Denny and Brothers, entering service by the middle of 1942.

Fuel consumption was heavy. A disadvantage was that, while a petrol boat could start from cold and get away immediately, the SGB had to remain in steam. Over time the addition of 18 mm (0.7 in) protective plate over the sides of the boiler and engine rooms, together with the extra armament and crew, increased the displacement to 260 tons and their service speed was consequentially reduced to 30 knots.

Veritable battleships of the coastal forces, the steam gun boats were heavily armed and could maintain high speed in a seaway. In action E-boat commanders respected the SGBs almost as much as destroyers as a single well-placed shot from their three-inch guns could disable or sink an E-boat.

Their armament was arranged with the three-inch gun on the aft deck behind the superstructure, just aft of the torpedo tubes that angled out on either side of the superstructure. There were a pair of (57 mm) six-pounder guns fore and aft, and two twin Oerlikon 20 mm cannons, one in the apex of the bow and one on the stern superfiring over the three-inch gun. Machine guns were mounted in twin mounts on either side of the bridge.

The nearest Kriegsmarine parallel to these were the R boats. Although these 160-ton vessels were designed as minesweepers-minelayers, this class was unique in being equipped with two torpedo tubes and sometimes an 88 mm gun, as well as the typical R boat armament of 37 mm and 20 mm guns and 16 mines. These were usually called "escort minesweepers". However, with a maximum speed of 24 knots they were much slower than the steam gun boats.

== Service ==
A lack of steel and turbines meant that the 52 boats initially planned were reduced to an order of nine boats which received the designations SGB 1 to 9. Numbers 1 and 2 were cancelled when their hulls were badly damaged by an air raid on the Southampton area. The 1st SGB Flotilla was formed at Portsmouth by mid-June 1942, under the command of Lieutenant-Commander Peter Scott. Their first fleet action took place in the Baie de Seine (the estuary of the Seine River) shortly after midnight on 19 June, when two vessels – SGB 7 and 8 – under the joint command of Lieutenant J. D. Ritchie, in company with the Hunt-class destroyer Albrighton encountered several E-boats escorting two German merchantmen. SGB 7 was sunk in this action. As a consequence, the Admiralty noted their vulnerability and refitted them with additional armour over their engine and boiler rooms. At the same time the six remaining boats were renamed after wildlife in the form "SGB Grey....".

SGB5 (Grey Owl) was damaged in a fight with German armed trawlers off Berneval while escorting landing craft in the Dieppe Raid August 1942.

1st SGB Flotilla was later based at HMS Aggressive, Newhaven, Sussex on the south coast of England.

In 1944 the six survivors were all converted to fast minesweepers and all except SGB9, Grey Goose, were sold off in the years after the war.

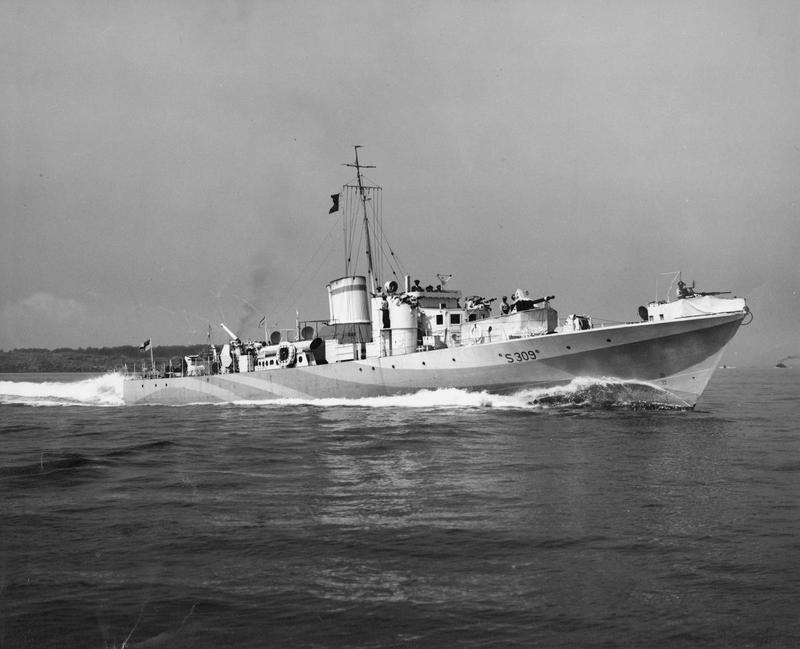
Grey Goose SGB9
captained by the flotilla commander Peter Scott

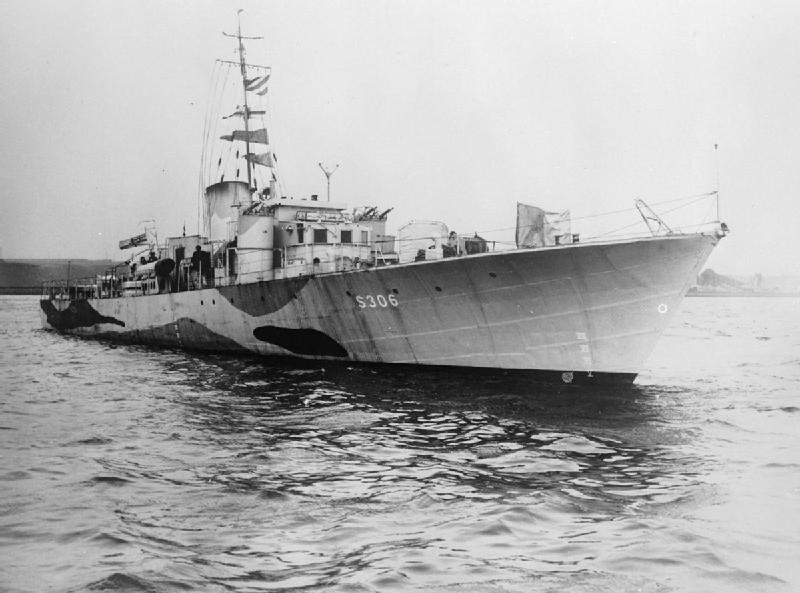
Grey Shark FL5161

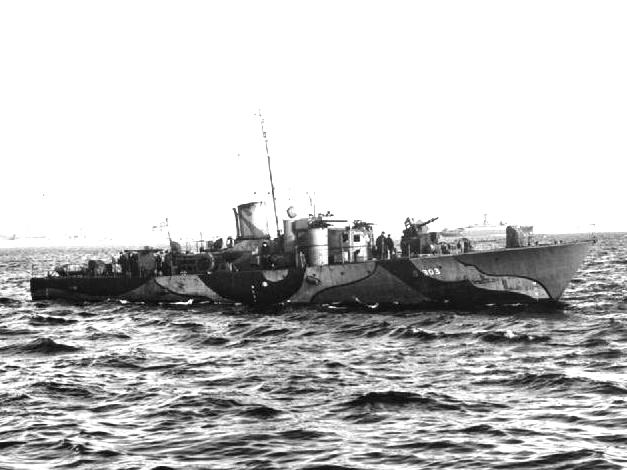
Grey Seal FL5168

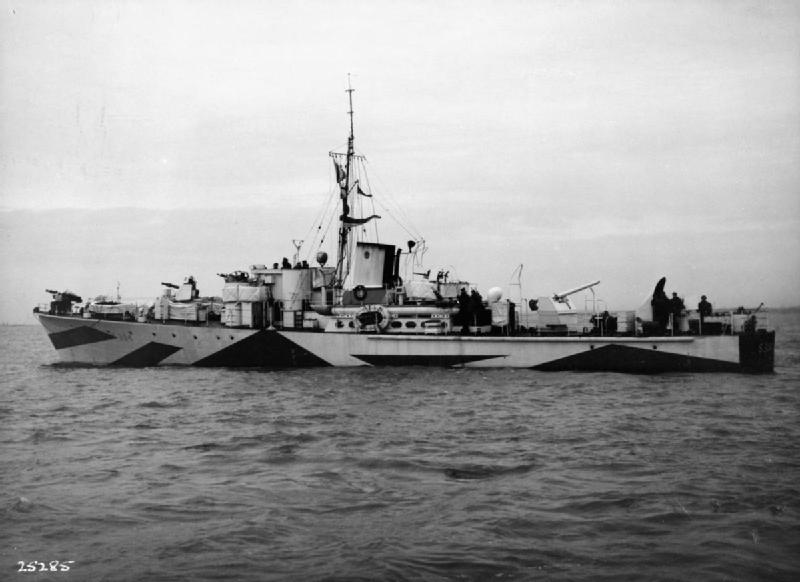
Grey Fox FL4636

== Ships in class ==
The nine vessels laid down, listed below, were all ordered on 8 November 1940.

| Ship | Builder | Laid down | Launched | Commissioned | Fate |
|---|---|---|---|---|---|
| SGB1 | Thornycroft, Woolston | | | | Cancelled |
| SGB2 | Thornycroft, Woolston | | | | Cancelled |
| SGB3; Grey Seal | Yarrow, Scotstoun | 24 January 1941 | 29 August 1941 | 21 February 1942 | For sale 20 August 1949 |
| SGB4; Grey Fox | Yarrow, Scotstoun | 24 January 1941 | 25 September 1941 | 15 March 1942 | For sale October 1947 |
| SGB5; Grey Owl | Hawthorn Leslie, Hebburn | 17 April 1941 | 27 August 1941 | 1 April 1942 | Sold to British Iron & Steel Corporation and scrapped 15 December 1949 |
| SGB6; Grey Shark | Hawthorn Leslie, Hebburn | 28 March 1941 | 17 November 1941 | 30 April 1942 | Sold 13 October 1947. Houseboat in 1949 |
| SGB7 | Denny, Dunbarton | 3 February 1941 | 25 September 1941 | 11 March 1942 | Sunk by gunfire from German surface vessels in the Seine Estuary 19 June 1942 |
| SGB8; Grey Wolf | Denny, Dunbarton | 3 February 1941 | 3 November 1941 | 17 April 1942 | Sold 3 February 1948 |
| SGB9; Grey Goose | J. Samuel White, Cowes | 23 January 1941 | 14 February 1942 | 4 July 1942 | Sold about 1957. Converted to houseboat, currently moored at Hoo St Werburgh. |

== Post-war ==
SGB9 remained in service as a propulsion trials vessel from 1952 to 1956, her steam engines replaced by Vospers with a pair of experimental Rolls-Royce RM60 gas turbines, becoming the first vessel so powered. The highly advanced turbines featured intercooled compressors and recuperators to boost turbine power output and reduce fuel consumption. The gas turbine powerplant provided 35% more power while weighing 50% less and was 25% less bulky, compared with the original steam machinery. Although the experimental powerplant proved very successful, it was too complex and supporting technology too immature for wider service at that time, and SGB9 was placed in reserve at the end of the trials in 1957. With the experimental engines removed, SGB9 was sold off in 1958, becoming a mercantile repair hulk. Sold in 1984, the hulk was converted to a houseboat and renamed Anserava. In 2020 she was moored on the River Medway near Hoo St Werburgh in Kent, England.
