= Spanish destroyer Audaz (D-31) =

Spanish Navy destroyer of 1953–1974

History
- Name: Audaz
- Builder: Sociedad Española de Construcción Naval, Ferrol
- Laid down: 26 September 1945
- Launched: 24 January 1951
- Completed: 30 June 1953
- Fate: Stricken 1974

General characteristics
- Class & type: Audaz-class destroyer
- Displacement: 1,124 t (1,106 long tons) standard
- Length: 93.9 m (308 ft 1 in) o/a
- Beam: 9.4 m (30 ft 10 in)
- Draught: 3.0 m (9 ft 10 in)
- Installed power: 23,000 kW (30,800 shp)
- Propulsion: 3 × boilers; 2 × Rateau-Bretagne geared steam turbines
- Speed: 33 knots (61 km/h; 38 mph)
- Range: 3,800 nmi (7,000 km; 4,400 mi) at 14 knots (26 km/h; 16 mph)
- Complement: 145
- Armament: 3 × 105 mm (4.1 in) dual-purpose guns; 4 × 37 mm (1.5 in) anti-aircraft guns; 8 × 20 mm (0.79 in) anti-aircraft guns; 6 × 533 mm (21.0 in) torpedo tubes

Audaz (Note: Audacious) was a Spanish destroyer of the class of the same name that was built after the Second World War. Audaz was launched in 1951 and completed in 1953. The ship was modified to an anti-submarine escort in the 1960s, and was stricken in 1974.

== Design ==
The Audaz class was based on the French Le Fier class design, plans for which had been provided to Spain by Nazi Germany after the Fall of France, but with a revised armament.

Audaz, as built, was 93.9 metres (308 ft 1 in) long overall and 90.0 metres (295 ft 3 in) between perpendiculars, with a beam of 9.4 metres (30 ft 10 in) and a draught of 3.0 metres (9 ft 10 in). Displacement was 1,124 tonnes (1,106 long tons) standard and 1,498 tonnes (1,474 long tons) full load. The ship had a unit machinery layout, with boiler and engine rooms alternating. Three La Siene 3-drum boilers generated steam at 3,400 kilopascals (500 psi) and 375 °F (191 °C) which was fed to Rateau-Bretagne geared steam turbines, rated at 23,000 kilowatts (30,800 shp) giving a speed of 33 knots (61 km/h; 38 mph). 290 tons of oil were carried, giving a range of 3,800 nautical miles (7,000 km; 4,400 mi) at a speed of 14 knots (26 km/h; 16 mph) and 900 nautical miles (1,700 km; 1,000 mi) at 33 knots. Audaz was armed with three 105-millimetre (4.1 in) dual-purpose guns, all mounted aft, with four 37 mm (1.5 in) anti-aircraft guns (one of which was mounted forward of the ship's bridge) and eight 20 mm (0.79 in) anti-aircraft guns. Six 533 mm (21.0 in) torpedo tubes in two triple mounts were fitted. The ship had a complement of 145 men.

In 1960–61 Audaz was refitted to serve as an anti-submarine escort. Anti-aircraft armament consisted of two US 76 mm (3 in) Mark 34 guns mounted aft and two 40 mm (1.6 in) Bofors L/70 guns, with one forward of the bridge and one aft of the ship's funnels. Two Hedgehog anti-submarine mortars were fitted, together with eight depth-charge throwers and two depth charge racks, and two launchers for 342 mm (13.5 in) Mark 32 anti-submarine torpedoes. Sensors consisted of MLA-1B air-search radar, SPS-5B surface search radar and SPG-34 fire control radar, with QHBa sonar. Displacement increased to 1,247 tonnes (1,227 long tons) standard and 1,570 tonnes (1,550 long tons) full load while speed dropped to 31.6 knots (58.5 km/h; 36.4 mph). The modified ship had a complement of 191.

== Construction and service ==
Audaz was laid down at Sociedad Española de Construcción Naval, Ferrol shipyard on 26 September 1945. Financial problems slowed construction, and she was not launched until 24 January 1951. Audaz underwent successful sea trials between 5 and 6 September 1952 off Ferrol. Audaz entered service on 30 June 1953, joining the 31st Escort Squadron, based at Ferrol.

In February 1955, Audaz took part in a training cruise to Barcelona in company with the cruiser Canarias and the destroyers José Luis Díez, Alcalá Galiano, Almirante Antequera, Císcar, Churruca and Gravina under the command of Vice-admiral Felipe de Abarzazu y Oliva.

Audaz completed modification to an anti-submarine escort with American armament and equipment on 28 June 1961, while that year, she was allocated the Pennant number D31. Audaz took part in the anti-submarine exercise "Hispania I" in November–December 1964, which took place in the Gulf of Cadiz, the Straits of Gibraltar and the Alboran Sea, with the task force co-operating with US Navy Neptune anti-submarine aircraft operating out of Rota. Audaz suffered a radar failure during the exercise, and had to use spare parts from the destroyer Liniers to repair her systems.

After the loss of sister-ship Ariete in 1966, the 31st Flotilla, including Audaz, transferred to Cartagena. Audaz was stricken on 9 September 1974.
