= Balloon carrier =

Ship type

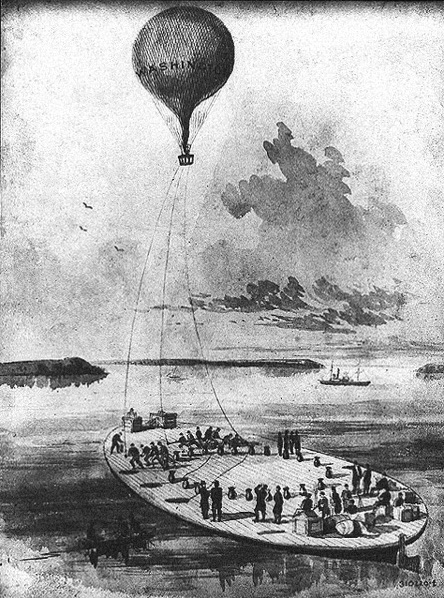
The Union Army balloon Washington aboard the George Washington Parke Custis, towed by the tug Coeur de Leon.

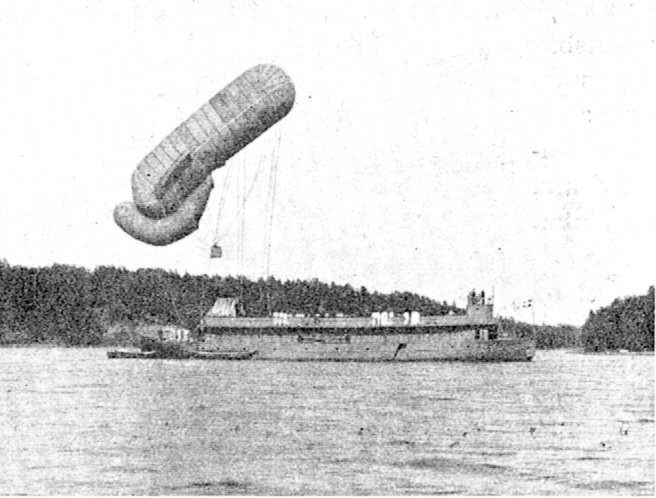
Swedish captive balloon carrier in 1907

A balloon carrier or balloon tender was a ship equipped with a balloon, usually tied to the ship by a rope or cable, and usually used for observation. During the second half of the 19th century and the early 20th century, these ships were built to have the furthest possible view of the surrounding waters. After several experiments, the type became formalized in the early 1900s, but was soon to be superseded by the development of seaplane carriers and regular aircraft carriers at the beginning of World War I.

== Early history ==
In 1849 the Austrian naval ship SMS Vulcano took part in the first aggressive use of balloons in warfare, serving as a balloon carrier (the precursor to the aircraft carrier) in the first offensive use of air power in naval aviation. Austrian forces besieging Venice attempted to float some 200 paper hot air balloons, each carrying a 24- to 30-pound bomb that was to be dropped from the balloon with a time fuse over the besieged city. The balloons were launched mainly from land; however, some were also launched from Vulcano. The Austrians used smaller pilot balloons to determine the correct fuse settings. At least one bomb fell in the city; however, due to the wind changing after launch, most of the balloons missed their target, and some drifted back over Austrian lines and the launching ship Vulcano.

Later, during the American Civil War, about the time of the Peninsula Campaign, gas-filled balloons were being used to perform reconnaissance on Confederate positions. The battles turned inland into the heavily forested areas of the Virginia Peninsula where balloons could not travel. A coal barge, the George Washington Parke Custis, was cleared of all deck rigging to accommodate the gas generators and apparatus of balloons. From this ship, professor Thaddeus S. C. Lowe, Chief Aeronaut of the Union Army Balloon Corps, made his first ascents over the Potomac River and telegraphed claims of his successful aerial venture. Other barges were converted to assist with the other military balloons transported about the eastern waterways. None of these Civil War craft ever sailed on the high seas. A Confederate balloon carrier, the CSS Teaser, was in service from 1861 to 1862 before being captured by the Union Navy.

In 1913 the Spanish engineer Leonardo Torres Quevedo designed a new type of boat called "Camp-Vessel", which allowed the transport of dirigible balloons attached to a mooring mast of his own design. He offered the patent to the British Army, but the project was dismissed. In 1922, the Spanish Navy constructed an airship carrier called Dédalo, which served during the Rif War.

== Types ==
Profile of Dédalo in 1922, after conversion into a seaplane tender and balloon carrier

Balloons launched from ships led to the formal development of balloon carriers, or balloon tenders, during World War I, by the navies of Great Britain, France, Germany, Italy, Russia, and Sweden. About 10 such balloon tenders were built with their main objective being aerial observation posts. These ships were either decommissioned or converted to seaplane tenders after the War.

== See also ==
- Barrage balloon
- Brodie landing system
- CAM ship
- Fighter catapult ship
