= Alhucemas =

Alhucemas is a Spanish name which may refer to:

- The Moroccan Rif city of Al Hoceima
- The Spanish Alhucemas Islands, including Peñón de Alhucemas
