= Spanish ship Almirante Lobo =

Various Spanish Navy ships

Two ships of the Spanish Navy have borne the name Almirante Lobo in honor of Miguel Lobo y Malagamba (1821–1875), a Spanish admiral:

- Almirante Lobo, a transport in commission from 1909 to 1942.
- Almirante Lobo, a transport in commission from 1954 to 1977.
