= Luis Cadarso y Rey de Andrade =

Spanish naval officer

Don Luis Cadarso y Rey de Andrade
- Portrait of Luis Cadarso y Rey de Andrade. (Collection of the Naval Museum, Madrid)
- Born: 1843; Noia, Spain
- Died: 1 May 1898 (aged 54–55); Manila Bay, Philippines
- Burial place: Panteón de Marinos Ilustres, San Fernando, Spain; 36°28′47″N 006°11′37″W
- Military career
- Allegiance: Kingdom of Spain
- Service: Spanish Navy
- Service years: 1858–1898
- Rank: Capitán de navío (Ship-of-the-line captain)
- Commands: Subic; Pampanga; Marqués del Duero; Reina Cristina
- Conflicts: Chincha Islands War; Spanish-Moro conflict; Philippine Revolution; Spanish-American War; Battle of Manila Bay

Luis Cadarso y Rey de Andrade (1843 – 1 May 1898) was a 19th-century Spanish Navy officer. He took part in operations related to the Chincha Islands War, saw action in the Spanish-Moro conflict and the Philippine Revolution, and also served as the governor of the eastern Caroline Islands in the Spanish East Indies. In Spain, he is a hero of the Spanish-American War, during which he was killed in action while in command of the unprotected cruiser Reina Cristina at the Battle of Manila Bay.

== Biography ==
=== Early life ===
Cadarso was born in Noia, Spain, the son of Luís Cadarso y Ayarza and María Manuela Rey de Andrade. His birth date is unrecorded, but he was baptised in the parish of San Martín on 25 November 1843.

=== Naval career ===
==== 1858–1874 ====
Cadarso enrolled as a aspirante (cadet) at the Naval Military Academy — known at the time as the Naval College of the San Carlos Settlement — in the San Carlos area of San Fernando on 1 January 1858. He was promoted to guardiamarina de 2º (midshipman second class) in 1860. His first sea duty also began in 1860, when he embarked on the ship of the line Rey Don Francisco de Asís, aboard which he made several training cruises in the Mediterranean Sea. He transferred to the ship of the line Reina Doña Isabel II for more training cruises. After completing these, he reported to the paddle gunboat Isabel la Católica, aboard which he made his first voyages in the Atlantic Ocean. He was promoted to guardiamarina de 1º (midshipman first class) in 1863, and shortly thereafter received an assignment to the screw frigate Reina Blanca, aboard which he made a transatlantic voyage to Cuba and back. Upon returning to Spain, he transferred to the screw frigate Nuestra Señora del Carmén, aboard which he took part in several Atlantic cruises.

Cadarso became an officer in 1865 when he received a promotion to alférez de navío (ship-of-the-line ensign). Shortly afterwards, he was assigned to the screw frigate Concepción. With him aboard, Concepción departed Cádiz on 10 August 1866 bound for Rio de Janeiro, Brazil, to replace screw frigates in Contralmirante (Counter Admiral) Casto Méndez Núñez's squadron which had fought in the southeastern Pacific Ocean during the Chincha Islands War. After arriving at Rio de Janeiro on 18 September 1866, she formed a division that also included the screw frigates Almansa and Navas de Tolosa.

Concepción and the rest of Méndez Núñez's squadron arrived at the Rio de la Plata (River Plate) on 12 December 1866. Spain had not yet reached a peace settlement with Bolivia, Chile, and Peru — its opponents in the Chincha Islands War — and after the Ministry of the Navy received word that a combined Chilean Navy-Peruvian Navy squadron planned to cross from the Pacific into the Atlantic Ocean, Méndez Núñez received orders to return to Rio de Janeiro. On 24 December 1866, the Ministry of the Navy ordered Méndez Núñez to move to Havana and prepare to defend the Antilles against attack. These orders reached Méndez Núñez on 1 February 1867. On 20 March 1867 Concepción, Almansa, and Navas de Tolosa arrived at Santiago de Cuba on the southeastern coast of Cuba under Méndez Núñez's overall command. The ships then proceeded to Havana, which they reached on 26 March 1867. After Méndez Núñez received new orders to proceed to Rio de Janeiro, he transferred his flag to Almansa and his squadron got underway, arriving at Rio de Janeiro in August 1867. The squadron again moved to the Rio de la Plata in November 1867.

In December 1868, Méndez Núñez turned over command of the squadron to Miguel Lobo y Malagamba, with Concepción and Reina Blanca forming a division. When an insurrection against the government broke out in Uruguay in May 1869, Lobo ordered Concepción to patrol the coast of the Río de la Plata to protect Spanish citizens. By the time Concepción arrived at Montevideo, Uruguay, on 13 June the insurrection had been defeated, so she returned to Rio de Janeiro. The schooner Ceres relieved Concepción on the South American station in August 1869. Concepción got underway from Rio de Janeiro at 07:30 on 17 August 1869 with a crew of only 363 men to return to Spain, where she called at Vigo before proceeding to Ferrol. (Note: Todoavante's biography of Cadarso claims that he traveled to Cuba to embark on Concepción there in 1865, and that Concepción then departed Havana in August 1865, stopped at Rio de Janeiro, deployed to the southeastern Pacific to replace the ships that had fought there in the Chincha Islands War, remained in the southeastern Pacific until 1869, then rounded Cape Horn and returned to Havana without incident. However, this narrative does not match the movements of Concepción during this period, nor is there evidence that any other ship of Méndez Núñez's squadron deployed in the southeastern Pacific throughout the 1865–1869 period.)

After returning to Spain aboard Concepción, Cadarso received a promotion to teniente de navío (ship-of-the-line lieutenant) in 1870 and was assigned to the Ferrol Naval Department, where he served in various duties. In 1872, he assumed duty in Madrid as a prosecutor for the Supreme Court of War and the Navy, which later became the Supreme Council of Military Justice.

==== 1874–1898 ====
In 1874, Cadarso left his court duties for an assignment in the Captaincy General of the Philippines in the Spanish East Indies. He spent the remainder of his naval career and his life there, never returning to Spain.

Upon arriving at the Cavite Naval Station on Luzon in the Philippines, Cadarso assumed duty as second-in-command of the corvette Vencedora and became involved in the centuries-long Spanish–Moro conflict. Vencedora conducted anti-piracy cruises under his command. He became the commanding officer of the brig Subic in 1875 and in that role participated in an expedition against the center of piracy on Jolo in the Sulu Archipelago. In 1876 he took command of the gunboat Pampanga, leading her in anti-smuggling and anti-piracy operations. He was promoted to teniente de navío de 1ª (ship-of-the-line lieutenant first class) in 1878 and took command of the aviso Marqués del Duero that year.

After relinquishing command of Marqués del Duero, Cadarso became chief adjutant of the Cavite Naval Station. From 1880 to 1883, he served as the military governor of the naval station and as an assistant in its hydrographic division. In 1887, he received a promotion to capitán de fragata (frigate captain) and an appointment as chief adjutant and director of naval weaponry at the Cavite Naval Station. He subsequently was appointed governor of the eastern Caroline Islands, where he had to take measures to secure the islands in the aftermath of an 1885 war scare with the German Empire over their status — the Carolines Question — and subdue rebellious tribes on Ponape who had killed the previous governor. In 1891, his governorship came to an end and he was named naval district commander at Manila. Subsequently, he became captain of the port of Manila, a position he held until 1894.

Cadarso spent 1895 at Manila without an assignment, but was promoted during the year to capitán de navío (ship-of-the-line captain). In mid-1896, he became the commanding officer of the unprotected cruiser Reina Cristina amid rumors than the United States had plans to seize the Philippine Islands from Spain. Meanwhile, the Philippine Revolution of 1896–1898 — known to the Spaniards as the "Tagalog Revolt" — broke out, and under Cadarso's command, Reina Cristina was actively involved in the Spanish campaign to put down the revolt. In addition to patrolling Philippine waters to prevent the smuggling of contraband to the insurgents, she supported Spanish Army actions against them at Cavite, Novaleta, and Binacayan, including the provision of naval gunfire support to Spanish troops ashore.

==== Spanish-American War ====
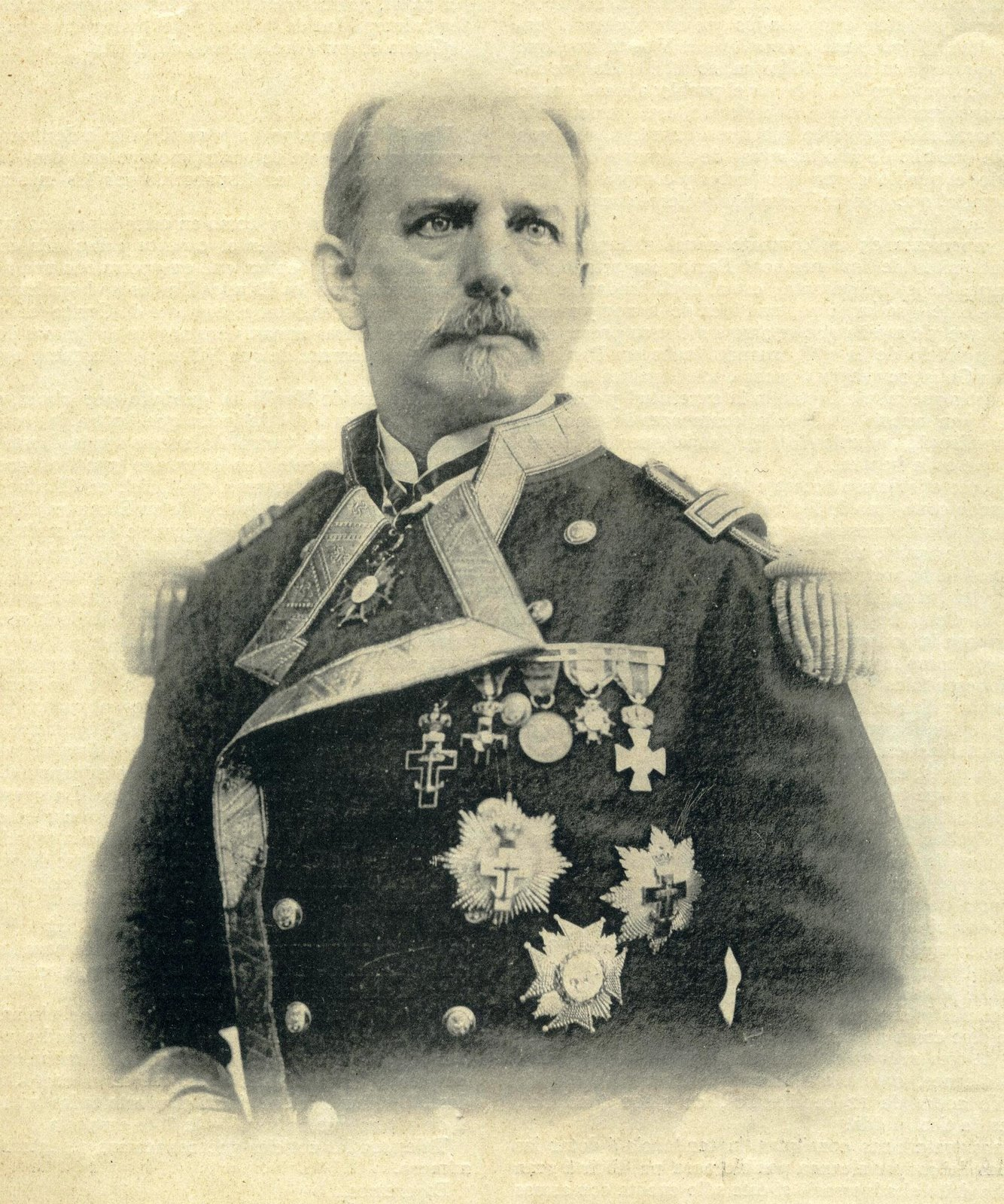

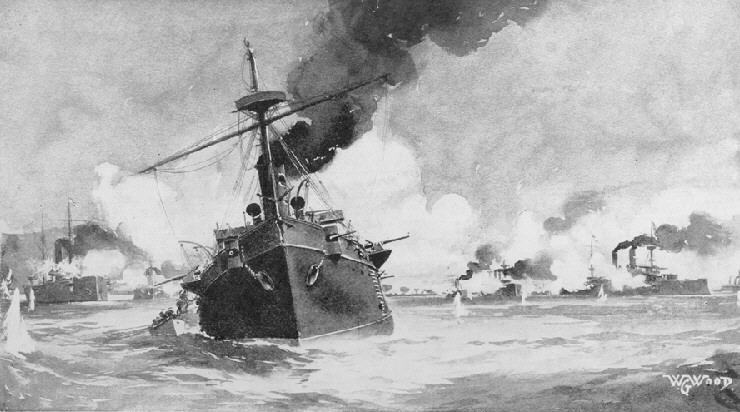
A painting of Reina Cristina in action during the Battle of Manila Bay on 1 May 1898.

The Spanish-American War broke out when the United States declared war on Spain on 25 April 1898, stipulating that the declaration was retroactive to 21 April. At the time, Reina Cristina was the flagship of Contralmirante (Counter Admiral) Patricio Montojo y Pasarón's Pacific Squadron at Manila. At 11:00 on 25 April Reina Cristina and the rest of the squadron departed Manila Bay en route Subic Bay, where Montojo thought he could take advantage of a minefield and coastal defense guns in the face of the American naval attack he believed his squadron soon would face. However, when Montojo arrived at Subic Bay, he found that few of the mines had been laid and the coastal battery had not yet been mounted.

On 28 April 1898 Montojo decided that the Spanish squadron would be better off if it returned to Manila Bay and offered battle at Cavite, where coastal guns could support him and where the shallow water would reduce the loss of life if his ships were sunk. At 10:30 on 29 April, Reina Cristina and the rest of the squadron departed Subic Bay. The wooden cruiser Castilla, was unable to get underway due to engine trouble, so Reina Cristina took her under tow for the voyage. The squadron arrived at Cavite later that day and anchored in Cañacao Bay under the lee of the Cavite Peninsula east of Sangley Point, 8 nautical miles (15 km; 9.2 mi) southwest of Manila.

At 04:00 on 1 May 1898, Montojo's squadron was still anchored there when he signalled all ships to prepare for action, and Reina Cristina readied herself to meet an imminent American attack. Just before 05:00, the Spaniards sighted the United States Navy's Asiatic Squadron under Commodore George Dewey approaching to attack the Spanish ships in their anchorage. In a few minutes, the first shots of the Battle of Manila Bay, the first major engagement of the Spanish–American War, were fired.

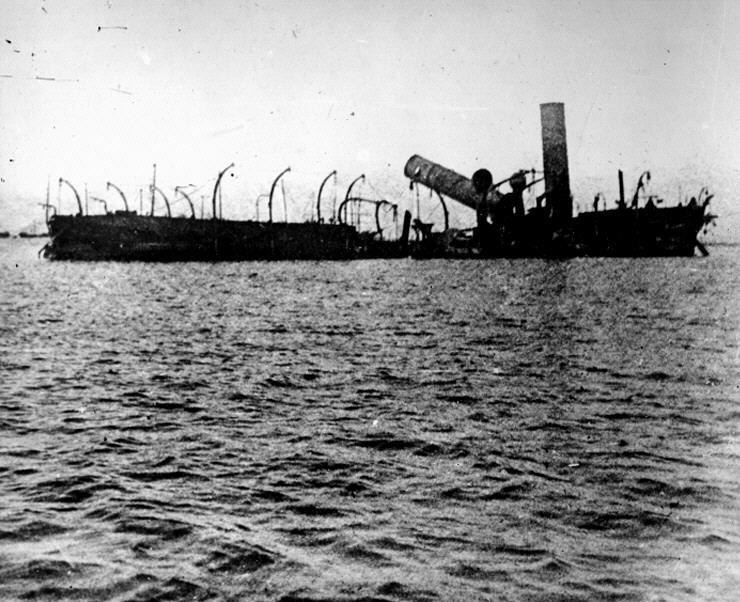
The wreck of Reina Cristina.

Reina Cristina slipped her mooring cables and prepared to maneuver. At 05:20, she opened fire along with the rest of her squadron and the Spanish coastal batteries, although Dewey's ships were out of range. Finally, at 05:40 hours, the U.S. squadron returned fire, with the protected cruisers USS Olympia, USS Baltimore, and USS Boston concentrating their fire on Reina Cristina. Soon thereafter, Reina Cristina was hit twice in rapid succession as Dewey's squadron steamed past; the hits knocked out several of her light guns and started fires, although her crew quickly put the fires out. The American squadron then reversed course and made a second pass. This time, Reina Cristina's casualties began to mount as she took numerous hits, including to her forecastle and hull. New fires broke out, and Montojo ordered Cadarso to flood her after magazine to prevent a catastrophic magazine explosion. Dewey's ships then again reversed course and made a third firing pass.

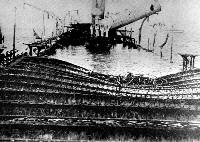
View aboard the wreck of Reina Cristina looking aft. The direction of the leaning funnel suggests the image may be reversed.

As the American squadron again reversed course to make a fourth pass, Montojo ordered Cadarso to get Reina Cristina underway. She steamed slowly toward Dewey's flagship, Olympia, with the intention of ramming Olympia. This prompted Dewey to order his squadron to close with and concentrate fire on Reina Cristina, and the range of the one-sided fight quickly closed to 1,200 yards (1,100 m). Reina Cristina was soon afire in several places, with most of her guns knocked out, her steering gear shot away, many holes blown in her hull, funnel, and mast, and half of her crew, including seven officers, killed or wounded.

Viewing Reina Cristina as beyond saving and fearing her magazines would explode, Montojo ordered Cadarso to scuttle and abandon her. The protected cruisers Isla de Cuba and Isla de Luzón came alongside to take off the wounded as American gunfire continued to pummel Reina Cristina and inflict casualties. Montojo transferred his flag to Isla de Cuba, leaving Cadarso in command of Reina Cristina. Cadarso refused to abandon ship until all his men were off before him. As he oversaw the abandonment of Reina Cristina, Olympia scored a hit on Reina Cristina with an 8-inch (203 mm) shell, resulting in a massive explosion that inflicted over 70 casualties on Reina Cristina′s crew. As Cadarso ran across the deck to assess the damage, another American shell struck and killed him. Reina Cristina, a burning wreck, soon sank.

== Commemoration ==
Two Spanish Navy ships have borne the name Cadarso in Cadarso's honor. The first, the Bustamante-class destroyer Cadarso, was in commission from 1917 to 1930. The second, the Lazaga-class patrol vessel Cadarso (P-03), was in commission from 1976 to 1993.
