= LaMont boiler =

Forced circulation boiler

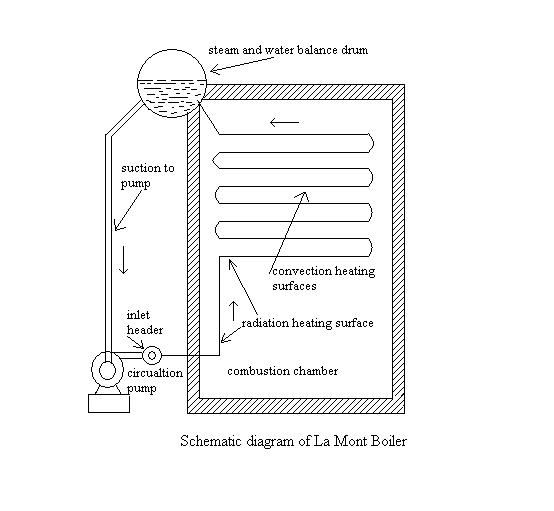

A LaMont boiler is a type of forced circulation water-tube boiler in which the boiler water is circulated through an external pump through long closely spaced tubes of small diameter. The mechanical pump is employed in order to have an adequate and positive circulation in steam and hot water boilers.

== History ==
Mark Benson was the first to work on the idea of forced circulation drum boilers. In 1918, Walter Douglas La Mont brought the forced circulation boiler from concept into existence. La Mont was a Lieutenant Commander and an engineer in the US Navy. He died of a heart attack in 1942 in New York.

La Mont's initial designs confirmed the lighter, safer and higher rates of heat transfer and evaporation per square foot as compared to that of the standard water tube boilers, also the circulation of vaporized water at a differential pressure of 2.5 bar was 8 to 10 times greater. The time needed for a La Mont Boiler to be able to deliver an evaporation rate of 100,000 pounds per hour was between 15 and 20 minutes. During World War II the U.S. Navy mainly relied upon Babcock & Wilcox boilers which were used commonly at the time. On the other hand, thousands were built in Europe and several German and Japanese ships used La Mont boilers.

== Principle ==
The circulation of water and steam mixture takes place with the help of an external pump which supplies water at a higher pressure than in a natural circulation boiler.

== Working ==
A centrifugal pump which forms the heart of this boiler is responsible to circulate water within the boiler system. It receives water from the drum and delivers this water to a distribution header as shown in the diagram here. The number of headers may differ in numbers and depends on the size and boiler design of each boiler.

The boiler heating surfaces includes a number of tubes arranged in a parallel form and the inlet ends are welded to the distributors or the headers. A circulation pressure is to be provided during the installation of the pump as per the boiler design and it should be sufficient to over come the resistance offered by the tubes. An even circulation takes place with the helps of the inlet nozzles provided at the inlet of tubes which creates the differential pressure adequate to cover the variations occurring at fluctuating loads or uneven firing conditions. The riser tubes outlet is welded to the collector headers and also directly to the drum containing steam and water.

== See also ==
- Steam Gun Boat
