= José Ferrándiz y Niño =

Spanish soldier and politician

José Ferrándiz
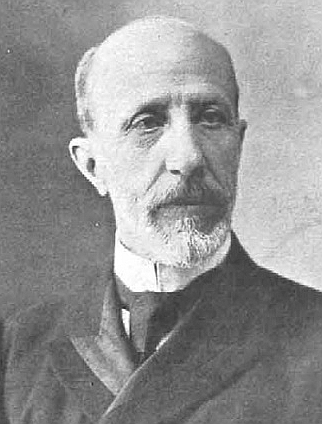
- José Ferrándiz in 1907.
- Born: 12 March 1847; Seville, Andalusia, Spain
- Died: 1 January 1918 (aged 70); Madrid, Spain
- Military career
- Branch: Spanish Navy
- Service years: 1855–1918
- Rank: Rear Admiral

Minister of the Navy of Spain
- In office 8 December 1903 – 16 December 1904
- Monarch: Alfonso XIII
- Prime Minister: Antonio Maura
- Preceded by: Eduardo Cobián
- Succeeded by: Marcelo Azcárraga Palmero
- In office 25 January 1907 – 21 October 1909
- Monarch: Alfonso XIII
- Prime Minister: Antonio Maura
- Preceded by: Juan Jácome y Pareja
- Succeeded by: Víctor María Concas

José Ferrándiz y Niño (1847–1918) was a Spanish naval officer and politician who became a vicealmirante (vice admiral) in the Spanish Navy. He was born in Seville and died in Madrid.

He was an instructor at the Colegio Naval Militar (Naval Military College), located aboard the old screw frigate Asturias at Ferrol. He was part of Contralmirante (Counter Admiral) Manuel de la Cámara y Livermoore's squadron — in command of a destroyer flotilla made up of Audaz (flagship), Osado, and Proserpina — when it was sent to the Philippines in the Spanish East Indies during the Spanish–American War in 1898; the squadron was detained in Port Said, after a dispute with Egypt over permission to coal, and never reached its destination.

He reached the rank of capitán de navío (ship-of-the-line captain) in 1903, when he was appointed Minister of the Navy during Antonio Maura's first government. He was in office again from 1907 to 1909. During this time, he enacted the law of 7 January 1908 (Official paper no 5, published 8 January 1908) for the building of a new squadron after the disastrous results of the Spanish–American War. Known as Ferrandiz's Law, this authorized:

- 3 España-class battleships of 15,700 tons each
- 3 Bustamante-class destroyers of 350 tons each
- 4 Recalde-class gunboats of 800 tons each
- 24 T-1-class torpedo boats of 180 tons each
- 4 tankers
- 1 tug
- Munitions and coal barges
- 1 transport, Almirante Lobo

He also ordered the modernization of the shipyards at the Arsenal de Cartagena and the Ferrol Naval Base and the construction of a new dry dock for ships of up to 20,000 displacement tons, which was required for the new España-class battleships.

He was elected senator from Lérida in 1903 and from Málaga in 1907. In 1909, King Alfonso XIII named him senator for life.

Preceded by Eduardo Cobián y Roffignac	Navy minister of Spain; 1903–1904	Succeeded by Marcelo de Azcárraga
Preceded by Juan Jácome y Pareja	Navy minister of Spain; 1907–1909	Succeeded by Víctor María Concas
