= Spanish destroyer Ariete =

Spanish Navy destroyer of 1961–1966

History

Spain
- Name: Ariete
- Builder: Sociedad Española de Construcción Naval, Ferrol
- Laid down: 3 August 1945
- Launched: 24 February 1955
- Commissioned: 7 February 1961
- Fate: Wrecked 25 February 1966

General characteristics
- Class & type: Audaz-class destroyer
- Displacement: 1,247 t (1,227 long tons) standard
- Length: 93.9 m (308 ft 1 in) o/a
- Beam: 9.4 m (30 ft 10 in)
- Draught: 3.0 m (9 ft 10 in)
- Installed power: 23,000 kW (30,800 shp)
- Propulsion: 3 × boilers; 2 × Rateau-Bretagne geared steam turbines
- Speed: 33 knots (61 km/h; 38 mph)
- Range: 3,800 nmi (7,000 km; 4,400 mi) at 14 knots (26 km/h; 16 mph)
- Complement: 145
- Armament: 2 × 76 mm (3.0 in)/50 anti-aircraft guns; 2 × 40 mm (1.6 in) Bofors L/70 anti-aircraft guns

Ariete (D-36) (English: Battering Ram) was a Spanish Audaz-class destroyer. Ariete was launched in 1955 and completed in 1961. The ship was lost when she ran aground on 25 February 1966.

== Design ==
The Audaz class was based on the French Le Fier class design, plans for which had been provided to Spain by Nazi Germany after the Fall of France, but with a revised armament. Ariete was modified during construction to a revised design as anti-submarine escorts, with a completely new armament and sensor outfit.

Audaz, as built, was 93.9 metres (308 ft 1 in) long overall and 90.0 metres (295 ft 3 in) between perpendiculars, with a beam of 9.4 metres (30 ft 10 in) and a draught of 3.0 metres (9 ft 10 in). Displacement was 1,247 tonnes (1,227 long tons) standard and 1,570 tonnes (1,550 long tons) full load. The ship had a unit machinery layout, with boiler and engine rooms alternating. Three La Siene 3-drum boilers generated steam at 3,400 kilopascals (500 psi) and 375 °F (191 °C) which was fed to Rateau-Bretagne geared steam turbines, rated at 23,000 kilowatts (30,800 shp), giving a speed of 31.6 knots (58.5 km/h; 36.4 mph). The ship had a complement of 191.

Anti-aircraft armament consisted of two US 76 mm (3 in) Mark 34 guns mounted aft and two 40 mm (1.6 in) Bofors L/70 guns, with one forward of the bridge and one aft of the ship's funnels. Two Hedgehog anti-submarine mortars were fitted, together with eight depth-charge throwers and two depth charge racks, and two launchers for 342 mm (13.5 in) Mark 32 anti-submarine torpedoes. Sensors consisted of MLA-1B air-search radar, SPS-5B surface search radar and SPG-34 fire control radar, with QHBa sonar.

== Construction and service ==
Ariete was laid down at Sociedad Española de Construcción Naval's, Ferrol shipyard on 3 August 1945. Financial problems slowed construction, and she was not launched until 24 February 1955. The availability of aid from the United States under the Mutual Defense Assistance Program allowed Ariete to be completed to a modified design as an anti-submarine frigate, and Ariete entered service on 7 February 1961, with the pennant number D 36. As with all the ships of her class, Ariete joined the 31st Escort Squadron, based at Ferrol. On 25 February 1966, Ariete ran aground off the coast of Galicia after an engine failure and was wrecked, with the ship's hull breaking up.
