= Spanish ship Audaz =

Various Spanish Navy ships

Three ships of the Spanish Navy have borne the name Audaz, meaning Audacious:

- Audaz, a Furor-class destroyer in commission from 1898 to 1924.
- Audaz, an Audaz-class destroyer in commission from 1953 to 1974.
- Audaz (P-45), a Meteoro-class offshore patrol vessel commissioned in 2018.
