= Spanish seaplane carrier Dédalo =

Spanish naval ship

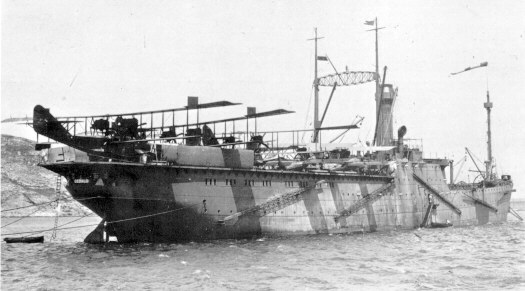
- Dédalo in dazzle camouflage, carrying three Felixstowe F.3 flying boats

History

Germany
- Name: Neuenfels
- Namesake: Burg Neuenfels
- Owner: DDG „Hansa“
- Port of registry: Bremen
- Builder: Wigham Richardson, Low Walker
- Cost: £81,750
- Yard number: 375
- Launched: 19 April 1901
- Completed: May 1901
- Refit: 1922
- Identification: code letters QHJR; call sign DNU
- Fate: seized by Spain, October 1918
- Notes: sister ships: Argenfels, Scharzfels

Spain
- Name: 1919: España No.6; 1921: Dédalo
- Namesake: Daedalus
- Acquired: 1921
- Commissioned: 1922
- Decommissioned: 1934
- Stricken: April 1936
- Fate: Scrapped 1940

General characteristics
- Type: 1901: cargo ship; 1922: seaplane tender & balloon carrier
- Tonnage: 5,650 GRT, 3,651 NRT
- Displacement: 9,900 tonnes
- Length: 420.0 ft (128.0 m)
- Beam: 55.2 ft (16.8 m)
- Depth: 20.5 ft (6.2 m)
- Decks: 1
- Installed power: 494 NHP, 3,000 shp (2,200 kW)
- Propulsion: 1 × screw; 1 × quadruple-expansion engine
- Speed: 11.1 knots (20.6 km/h)
- Complement: (as seaplane tender): 398
- Armament: (as seaplane tender): 4 × Krupp 105 mm (4.1 in) guns; 2 × 57 mm (2.2 in) anti-aircraft guns
- Aircraft carried: (as seaplane tender and balloon carrier): 20 seaplanes or flying boats, 2 airships, 2 captive balloons

Dédalo was a steamship that was built in England in 1901 as the cargo ship Neuenfels for the German shipping company DDG "Hansa". Spain seized her in 1918 and had her converted into a seaplane tender and balloon carrier, entering Spanish Navy service in 1922. She served in the Rif War, in which her aircraft supported the Alhucemas landing of Spanish forces in 1925. Dédalo was decommissioned in 1934 and scrapped in 1940.

Dédalo is Spanish for Daedalus. This is the first of two Spanish Navy ships to bear the name. The second was the former United States Navy aircraft carrier USS Cabot, which Spain borrowed in 1967, bought in 1972 and decommissioned in 1989.

== Building ==
In 1901 Wigham Richardson built four ships with consecutive yard numbers at its Neptune Yard in Low Walker on the River Tyne for the DDG "Hansa" shipping line. Three were sister ships: Argenfels launched in 7 January, Neuenfels launched on 19 April and Scharzfels launched on 5 June. The other ship was Wildenfels, which was smaller than the three sisters, and launched on 5 March.

Neuenfels was yard number 375. Her registered length was 420.0 ft (128.0 m), her beam was 55.2 ft (16.8 m), her depth was 20.5 ft (6.2 m) and her tonnages were 5,650 GRT, 3,651 NRT. She had a single screw, driven by a four-cylinder quadruple-expansion engine that was rated at 494 NHP. She achieved 11.1 knots (20.6 km/h) on her sea trials.

DDG Hansa paid Wigham Richardson £81,750 to build Neuenfels, on which Wigham Richardson netted a profit of £8,543–3s–6d. She was registered in Bremen. Her code letters were QHJR. By 1914 she was equipped for wireless telegraphy, and her call sign was DNU.

== Seizure and conversion ==
When the First World War began in July 1914, many German merchant ships made for the nearest neutral port to shelter from the Royal Navy, French Navy and Russian Navy. Neuenfels took refuge in Vigo in Spain. During the Atlantic U-boat campaign of World War I, the Imperial German Navy sank a number of neutral ships, notably during times of unrestricted submarine warfare. These included a number of Spanish merchant ships, for which the Spanish government sought compensation from the German government. In October 1918, Spain seized six German merchant ships that were in Spanish ports. Neuenfels was seized on 22 October, and provisionally renamed España No.6.

For some time the Spanish Navy had wanted to acquire a seaplane tender. In the autumn of 1921 España No.6 was transferred to the Navy, and from that December she spent five months in Barcelona being converted. The conversion was completed for eight million pesetas, and in 1922 the Navy commissioned her as Dédalo.

== Aircraft facilities ==
Profile of Dédalo in 1922, after conversion into a seaplane tender and balloon carrier

Dédalo could carry two captive observation balloons of 1,200 m^{3} (42,000 cu ft) volume, two Italian-built armed airships of 1,500 m^{3} (53,000 cu ft) volume, and up to 20 seaplanes or flying boats. During her career she carried several types of flying boat, including the Felixstowe F.3, Savoia S.16 and S.16 bis, Macchi M.18 and Supermarine Scarab.

Dédalo had two hangars. One was forward of her superstructure and was for her airships, for which she had a mooring mast on her bow. The other was abaft her superstructure, and had an elevator to service her flying boats. Having neither a flush deck nor a catapult, she used cranes to launch and retrieve her flying boats.

== Naval service ==
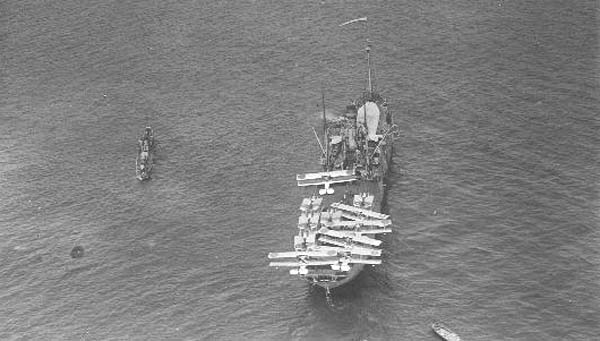
Dédalo taking part in the Alhucemas landing, September 1925

Dédalo was based at Cartagena. She took part in the Rif War until late September 1925 under the command of Wenceslao Benítez Inglott. On 8 September 1925 her Supermarine Scarab flying boats and one of her airships conducted bombing raids in support of the Alhucemas landing, which was the first successful amphibious landing of the modern era.

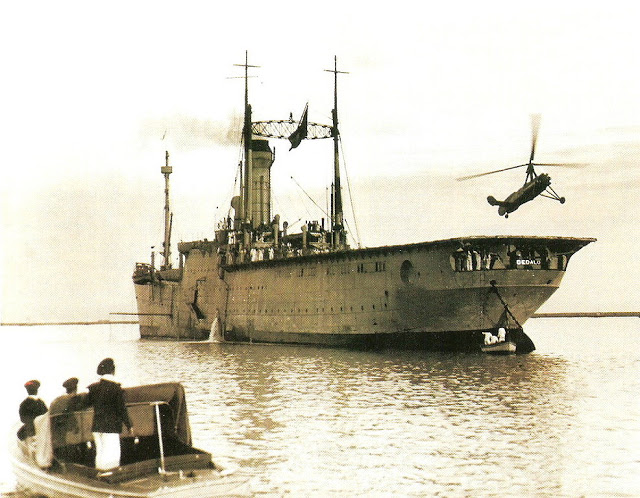
Juan de la Cierva´s Cierva C.30 autogyro taking off from Dédalo in 1934

After the Second Spanish Republic was declared in April 1931, Dédalo became part of the Spanish Republican Navy. On 7 March 1934 aviation history was made when Juan de la Cierva, the inventor of the autogyro, performed a perfect landing on Dédalo with a Cierva C.30 autogyro, registered G-ACIO, near the Port of Valencia. Half an hour later Cierva and his autogyro took off from her deck, after a short run of just 24 metres (79 ft). This was the first rotorcraft to take off and land on the deck of a ship.

Dédalo was decommissioned in 1934, laid up at Sagunto in 1935, and struck from the naval register in April 1936. That July the Spanish Civil War began, during which a Nationalist air attack damaged her and prevented her from leaving Cartagena. The war ended in April 1939, and on 1 March 1940 she was towed to Valencia to be scrapped. The ship sank due to the bomb damage in Valencia harbour, becoming a navigational hazard. She was subsequently destroyed with explosives to reopen the port.

== Bibliography ==
- Armada Española (2017). Cien años de aviación naval 1917–2017 (PDF) (in Spanish). Madrid: Ministerio de Defensa. pp. 57–60. ISBN 978-84-9091-238-6.
- Díaz-Bedia Astor, Luis (2016). "Los Portaaviones Españoles: Un Siglo de Evolución con el Arma Aérea" (PDF). Revista General de Marina (in Spanish). 271: 274.
- Laforet Hernández, Juan José (2010). lmirantes Horiundos de Canarias: III Jornadas Marítimo-Navales (in Spanish). Las Palmas de Gran Canaria: Real Sociedad Económica de Amigos del País de Gran Canaria. p. 74. ISBN 978-84-933042-8-7.
- Lloyd's Register of British and Foreign Shipping. Vol. I–Steamers. London: Lloyd's Register. 1901.
- The Marconi Press Agency Ltd (1914). The Year Book of Wireless Telegraphy and Telephony. London: The Marconi Press Agency Ltd.
