= Bustamante-class destroyer =

Spanish navy ships

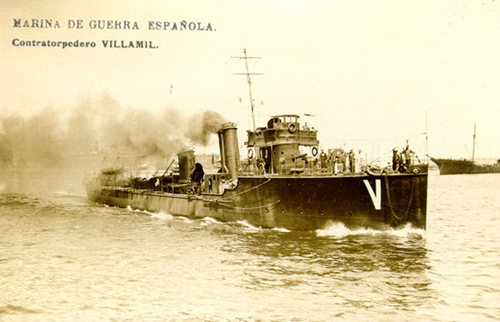
- Villaamil during her sea trials in 1916.

Class overview
- Builders: SECN, Cartagena
- Operators: (Spain) Spanish Navy
- Preceded by: Furor class
- Succeeded by: Alsedo class
- Completed: 3
- Scrapped: 3

General characteristics
- Type: Destroyer
- Displacement: 530 long tons (540 t) normal
- Length: 64.7 m (212 ft 3 in)
- Beam: 6.7 m (22 ft 0 in)
- Draft: 1.7 m (5 ft 7 in)
- Propulsion: 3-shaft steam turbines, 6,250 shp (4,660 kW)
- Speed: 28 knots (52 km/h; 32 mph)
- Range: 900 nmi (1,700 km; 1,000 mi) at 15 knots (28 km/h; 17 mph)
- Complement: 70
- Armament: 5 × 57 mm (2.2 in) guns; 4 × 450 mm (17.7 in) torpedo tubes (2×2)

The Bustamante class was a class of three destroyers of the Spanish Navy. They were built in Spain to a British design completing between 1914 and 1916. They served until 1930–1932. The Bustamante class saw little service, spent mostly in a training squadron and patrolling the coasts of Spain. Compared to contemporary foreign designs, the Bustamante class was considered outclassed, with poor armament and a lack of speed.

== Design and description ==
In 1908, the Spanish Cortes passed a Naval Law that reorganised Spain's naval dockyards to make them more efficient and allowing a modern navy to be built. The law also authorised a large shipbuilding construction programme, with three battleships, three destroyers, 24 torpedo boats and four gunboats to be completed by 1914. While the ships were to be built in Spain's newly refurbished shipyards, most of the ships would be of foreign design. The three destroyers were built by Sociedad Española de Construcción Naval (SECN), the consortium set up to refurbish and manage the Spanish shipyards, at Cartagena to a British design (either by Vickers or John Brown — both companies were part of the SECN consortium).

The new destroyers were 64.7 metres (212 ft 3 in) long, with a beam of 6.7 m (22 ft 0 in), a draft of 1.7 m (5 ft 7 in) and displaced 530 long tons (539 t). They were powered by steam turbines, fed by Yarrow or Normand boilers and driving three propeller shafts. The machinery was rated at 6,250 shaft horsepower (4,660 kW) which gave a speed of 28 knots (52 km/h; 32 mph). The vessels had a range of 900 nautical miles (1,700 km; 1,000 mi) at 15 knots (28 km/h; 17 mph). Two funnels were fitted. Armament consisted of five Vickers 57 mm (2.2 in) guns, two side-by-side on the ships' forecastle, one aft on the ships' centreline, and the remaining two guns on the ships' beam. Two sets of twin 450 mm (17.7 in) torpedo tubes were fitted.

== Construction and service ==
The three destroyers — Bustamante, Villaamil and Cadarso — were laid down between 1911 and 1913. Bustamante and Villaamil were launched in 1913 while Cadarso was launched in 1914. Bustamante was completed in 1914, with Villaamil and Cadarso completing in 1916. Owing to the cessation of material support from Great Britain during the First World War Cadarso was fitted with 380 mm (15 in) torpedo tubes instead of the planned 450 mm tubes. By the time they entered service, the Bustamante class were outclassed by contemporary foreign destroyers, being poorly armed and slow.

The ships carried out neutrality patrols around Spain's coasts during World War I (1914–1918). They all saw service in the Rif War of 1921–1926 and otherwise spent their time in the Training Squadron, which served as a type of home squadron in Spanish waters. They were decommissioned in the early 1930s, with Cadarso being scrapped in 1930, Bustamante in 1931, and Villaamil in 1932.

== Bustamante-class ships ==
After the Second Spanish Republic replaced the Kingdom of Spain in April 1931, Bustamante and Villaamil were part of the Spanish Republican Navy late in their service lives.

| Ship name | Builder | Laid down | Launched | Commissioned | Decommissioned | Fate |
|---|---|---|---|---|---|---|
| Bustamante | Sociedad Española de Construcción Naval (SECN), Cartagena, Spain | 25 August 1911 | 3 January 1913 | 23 March 1914 | 20 October 1931 | Scrapped 1931 |
| Villaamil | Sociedad Española de Construcción Naval (SECN), Cartagena, Spain | 25 November 1912 | 10 December 1913 | 16 August 1916 | Late 1932 | Scrapped 1932 |
| Cadarso | Sociedad Española de Construcción Naval (SECN), Cartagena, Spain | 24 September 1913 | 24 September 1914 | 25 August 1917 | 1930 | Scrapped 1930 |
