= Audaz-class destroyer =

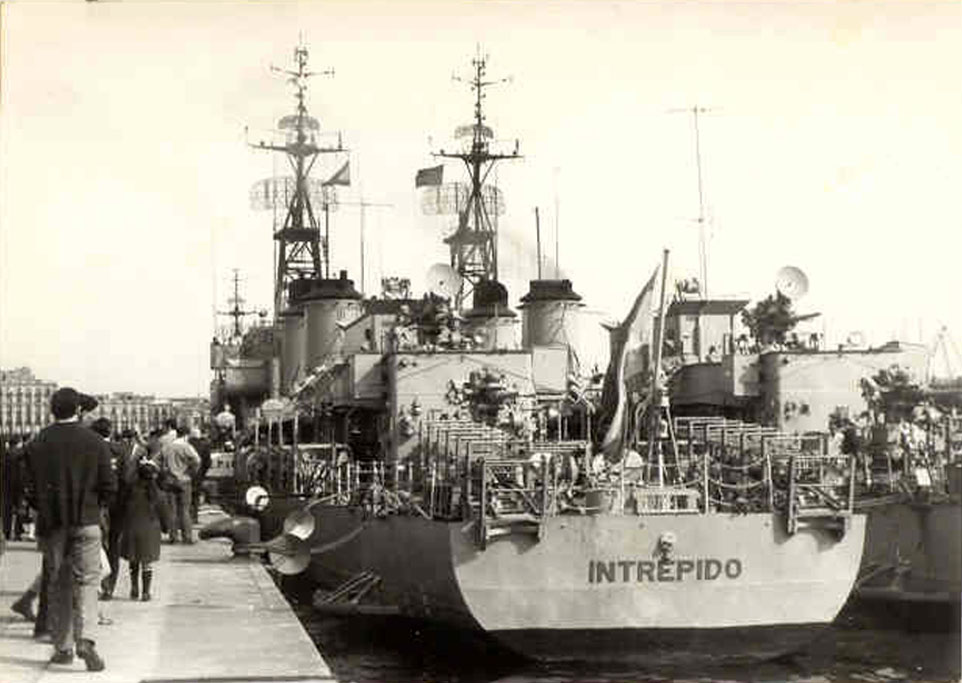

Class overview
- Builders: Sociedad Española de Construcción Naval, Ferrol
- Operators: Spanish Navy
- Preceded by: Churruca class
- Succeeded by: Lepanto class
- Built: 1945–1965
- In commission: 1953–1982
- Completed: 9
- Lost: 1
- Scrapped: 8

General characteristics Original design
- Displacement: 1,124 t (1,106 long tons) standard
- Length: 93.9 m (308 ft 1 in) o/a
- Beam: 9.4 m (30 ft 10 in)
- Draught: 3.0 m (9 ft 10 in)
- Installed power: 23,000 kW (30,800 shp)
- Propulsion: 3 × boilers; 2 × Rateau-Bretagne geared steam turbines
- Speed: 33 knots (61 km/h; 38 mph)
- Range: 3,800 nmi (7,000 km; 4,400 mi) at 14 knots (26 km/h; 16 mph)
- Complement: 145
- Armament: 3 × 105 mm (4.1 in) dual-purpose guns; 4 × 37 mm (1.5 in) anti-aircraft guns; 8 × 20 mm (0.79 in) anti-aircraft guns; 6 × 533 mm (21.0 in) torpedo tubes

General characteristics As modified
- Displacement: 1,247 t (1,227 long tons) standard
- Armament: 2 × 76 mm (3.0 in)/50 anti-aircraft guns; 2 × 40 mm (1.6 in) Bofors L/70 anti-aircraft guns

The Audaz class was a class of nine destroyers built for the Spanish Navy after the Second World War. Construction was slow, with only four completed to the original design from 1953–1956. The remaining five ships completed as anti-submarine escorts with a new armament and sensor fit from 1960 to 1965, while the original four ships were also modified to this standard. Built at Ferrol, they completed in 1946–1950 and were rated as gunboats, and were redesignated as frigates in 1959. The last of the class, Intrepido, was stricken in 1982.

== Construction and design ==
In 1945, the Spanish State began work on a class of nine small destroyers or torpedo boats, based on the French Le Fier class design. Seven Le Fier-class ships were laid down in 1939–1940 before the French surrender in 1940 stopped construction. Germany restarted construction of six of the ships, with different armament, but none were completed. The Spanish ships used the same armament layout as intended by the Germans.

The ships were 93.9 metres (308 ft 1 in) long overall and 90.0 metres (295 ft 3 in) between perpendiculars, with a beam of 9.4 metres (30 ft 10 in) and a draught of 3.0 metres (9 ft 10 in). Displacement was 1,124 tonnes (1,106 long tons) standard and 1,498 tonnes (1,474 long tons) full load. They had a unit machinery layout, with boiler and engine rooms alternating. Three La Seine 3-drum boilers generated steam at 3,400 kilopascals (500 psi) and 375 °F (191 °C) which was fed to Rateau-Bretagne geared steam turbines, rated at 23,000 kilowatts (30,800 shp) giving a speed of 33 knots (61 km/h; 38 mph). 290 tons of oil were carried, giving a range of 3,800 nautical miles (7,000 km; 4,400 mi) at a speed of 14 knots (26 km/h; 16 mph) and 900 nautical miles (1,700 km; 1,000 mi) at 33 knots.

As originally designed, they were armed with three 105-millimetre (4.1 in) dual-purpose guns, all mounted aft, with four 37 mm (1.5 in) anti-aircraft guns (one of which was mounted forward of the ship's bridge) and eight 20 mm (0.79 in) anti-aircraft guns. Six 533 mm (21.0 in) torpedo tubes in two triple mounts were fitted. The ships had a complement of 145 men.

From 1959, the availability of US military aid resulted in the five ships that were still being built to be completed to a revised design as anti-submarine escorts, with a completely new armament and sensor outfit, while the four ships which had been delivered were refitted to the new standard. Anti-aircraft armament consisted of two US 76 mm (3 in) Mark 34 guns mounted aft and two 40 mm (1.6 in) Bofors L/70 guns, with one forward of the bridge and one aft of the ship's funnels. Two Hedgehog anti-submarine mortars were fitted, together with eight depth-charge throwers and two depth charge racks, and two launchers for 342 mm (13.5 in) Mark 32 anti-submarine torpedoes. The modified ships were fitted with MLA-1B air-search radar, SPS-5B surface search radar and SPG-34 fire control radar, with QHBa sonar.

Displacement increased to 1,247 tonnes (1,227 long tons) standard and 1,570 tonnes (1,550 long tons) full load while speed dropped to 31.6 knots (58.5 km/h; 36.4 mph) The revised ship's complement was recorded as 191 in 1971 and 199 in 1979.

== Service ==
Although all nine ships were laid down at the Sociedad Española de Construcción Naval (SECN) shipyard at Ferrol dockyard in 1945, financial problems slowed construction, and the first ship, Audaz, was not completed until 1953. Three more were completed by 1956, with the remaining five ships completing to the revised arrangement from 1960 to 1965, while the original four ships were modernised by the end of 1963.

One ship, Ariete, was wrecked in 1966 when it ran aground, while the remaining ships started to be discarded in 1972, with the last ship, Intrépido, stricken in 1982.

== Ships ==
At first, the ships of the class were designated as conventional destroyers, but they were redesignated as fast frigates in 1955, as anti-submarine frigates in 1956 and as anti-submarine destroyers in 1961.

Name	Pennant number (Note: From 1961)	Laid down	Launched	Completed	Fate
Ariete	D36	3 August 1945	24 February 1955	7 February 1961	Ran aground and wrecked at entrance to River Muros 25 February 1966.
Audaz	D31	26 September 1945	24 January 1951	30 June 1953	Stricken 1974
Furor	D34	3 August 1945	24 February 1955	9 September 1960	Stricken 1974
Intrépido	D38	14 July 1945	15 February 1961	25 March 1962	Stricken 1982
Meteoro (Note: Originally named Atrevido.)	D33	3 August 1945	4 September 1951	30 November 1955	Stricken 1975
Osado	D32	3 August 1945	4 September 1951	26 January 1955	Stricken 1972
Rayo	D35	3 August 1945	4 September 1951	26 January 1956	Stricken 1974
Relámpago	D39	14 July 1945	26 September 1961	7 July 1965	Stricken 1965
Temerario	D37	14 July 1945	29 March 1960	16 March 1964	Stricken 1965
