= Court of the Lions =

Historic palace inside the Alhambra in Granada, Spain

- Patio de los Leones
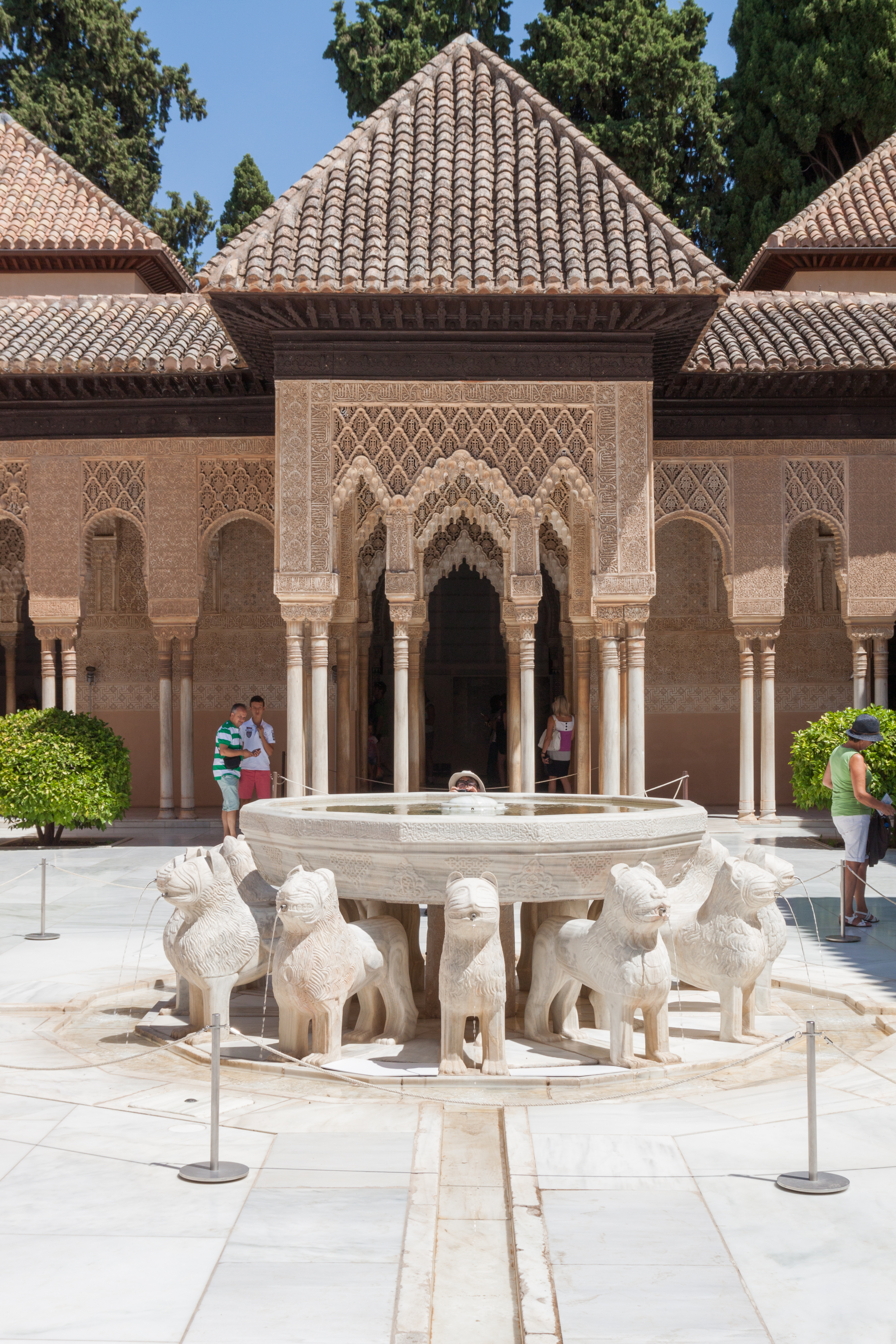
- Fountain and eastern pavilion of the courtyard

General information
- Type: Palace
- Architectural style: Moorish (Nasrid period)
- Location: Alhambra, Granada, Spain
- Coordinates: 37°10′37″N 3°35′21″W
- Construction started: 1362
- Completed: between 1377 and 1390

Technical details
- Material: brick, wood, stucco, marble

The Court of the Lions (Spanish: Patio de los Leones) or Palace of the Lions (Spanish: Palacio de los Leones) is a palace in the heart of the Alhambra, a historic citadel formed by a complex of palaces, gardens and forts in Granada, Spain. It was commissioned by the Nasrid sultan Muhammad V of the Emirate of Granada in Al-Andalus. Its construction started in the second period of his reign, between 1362 and 1391 AD. Along with the Alhambra, the palace is part of a UNESCO World Heritage Site. It was minted in Spain's 2011 limited edition of €2 Commemorative Coins.

The Palace of the Lions is one of the most famous palaces in Islamic architecture and exemplifies the apogee of Nasrid architecture in Al-Andalus. The architecture of the palace presented a significant shift in the design of Nasrid palaces and introduced new trends in ornamentation. The building consists of a rectangular courtyard centered on a marble fountain with twelve sculpted lions. Four main halls surround the courtyard, along with some upper-floor rooms. Water channels connect the central fountain with smaller fountains in the four halls. The halls feature some of the most elaborate and sophisticated muqarnas vaults in the Islamic world.

== Name ==
The name "Palace of the Lions" or "Court of the Lions" is a modern designation given to the palace, based on the notable lion sculptures around the central fountain. Due to limited historical documentation, the palace's original name during the Nasrid period cannot be confirmed for certain. One theory is that it was known as the Qasr ar-Riyad (Arabic: قصر الرياض, lit. 'Palace of the Garden') or, more fully, Qasr ar-Riyad as-Sa'id (Arabic: قصر الرياض السعيد, lit. 'Palace of the Joyous Garden'). Another suggestion is that it was known as Dar 'Aisha (Arabic: بيت عائشة, lit. 'House of 'Aisha'), purportedly named after one of Muhammad V's favourite wives, although there is no historical record of what his wives were called. This name was later corrupted to Daraxa or Daraja in Spanish, and survives in the name of the adjoining Lindaraja courtyard.

== History ==
=== Nasrid period ===
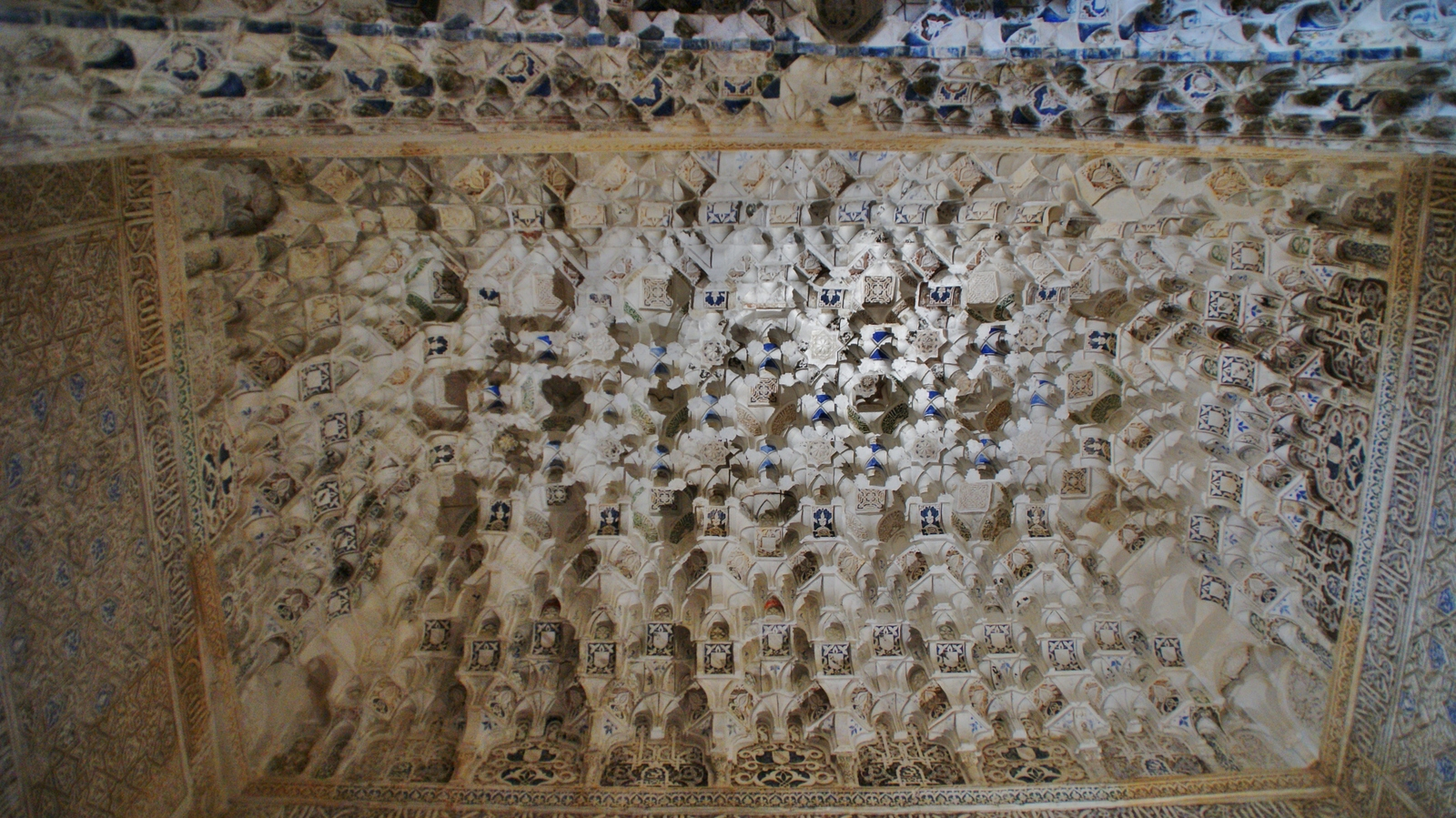
Example of a muqarnas vault in the Hall of Kings (Sala de los Reyes) in the Palace of the Lions. The extensive use of muqarnas was a feature of Nasrid architecture under Muhammad V.

The Alhambra was a self-contained palace-city surrounded by fortifications, built up by the Nasrid rulers of the Emirate of Granada in the 13th to 15th centuries. Multiple palaces were added and expanded over the years by different rulers. The Palace of the Lions was added by Muhammad V, who is also responsible for other important contributions to the Alhambra. The period of Muhammad V's reign is considered by scholars to mark the apogee of Nasrid architecture, characterized in particular by a profusive use of muqarnas (stalactite-like sculpting) and three-dimensional muqarnas vaults.

The chronology of construction in the Palace of the Lions is not clearly established, but it took place during Muhammad V's second reign (1362–1391), after his return from a period of exile. The Hall of the Two Sisters (Sala de Dos Hermanas), on the north side of the court, was completed in 1362 or between 1362 and 1365, when Muhammad V was celebrating his return to the throne and was also refurbishing the Mexuar and the Comares Palace. According to scholar Felix Arnold, the rest of the palace was built between 1377 and 1390. Some scholars have suggested that the palace was most likely completed in 1380. Inscriptions throughout the palace feature poems by Ibn Zamrak, a poet and long-serving vizier at the time, which suggests that he was probably involved in its design.

The area the Palace of the Lions was built on was formerly part of a larger garden or riad. Much of the area around it remained an open garden afterward, including the area on its north side which is now occupied by the Patio de Lindaraja (Courtyard of Lindaraja). Possibly because of this, the palace's original name may have been Qasr ar-Riyad (Arabic: قصر الرياض, lit. 'Palace of the Garden'). During the Nasrid era, the palace was completely independent from the nearby Comares Palace to the west and had its own street entrance. On the south side of the palace, separated from it by a narrow street, was the Rawda (Arabic: روضة), the dynastic mausoleum of the Nasrids, of which only the foundations remain today.

A widely-held scholarly view is that the palace was intended to serve as a private residence with a more intimate character than the Comares Palace, which served more official public functions. It may have served as a pleasure palace for entertainment. In his 2004 book on the Alhambra, Robert Irwin argued that while this interpretation is plausible, there is little direct evidence about the palace's function. It has also been suggested that the palace was built to commemorate Muhammad V's victories, in particular his retaking of Algeciras in 1369. Robert Irwin states that there is no direct evidence for this interpretation either and that the chronology of events makes it unlikely. However, the loot gained from those victories may have helped Muhammad V finance his construction projects.

One theory by art historian Juan Carlos Ruiz Souza proposes that the palace may have actually been a madrasa and zawiya instead. According to this interpretation, the so-called Hall of Kings (Sala de los Reyes) and the Hall of Muqarnas (Sala de los Mocárabes) would have served as the palace library, the Hall of Two Sisters (Sala de Dos Hermanas) would have been a multifunctional space, the upstairs Court of the Harem (Patio del Harén) would have been a residential apartment for the person in charge of the madrasa, and the Hall of the Abencerrajes (Sala de los Abencerrajes) would have served as the madrasa's oratory and possibly also as the mausoleum of Muhammad V himself. Another scholar commenting on this theory, Cynthia Robinson, argues that while its function as a formal madrasa and a mausoleum may be hard for scholars to accept, the building could have still functioned as a kind of bayt al-ḥikma ("house of knowledge") – meaning a place dedicated to education, contemplation and other intellectual or cultural activities – aimed at a royal Nasrid audience and related to their patronage of Sufism.

=== After the Reconquista ===
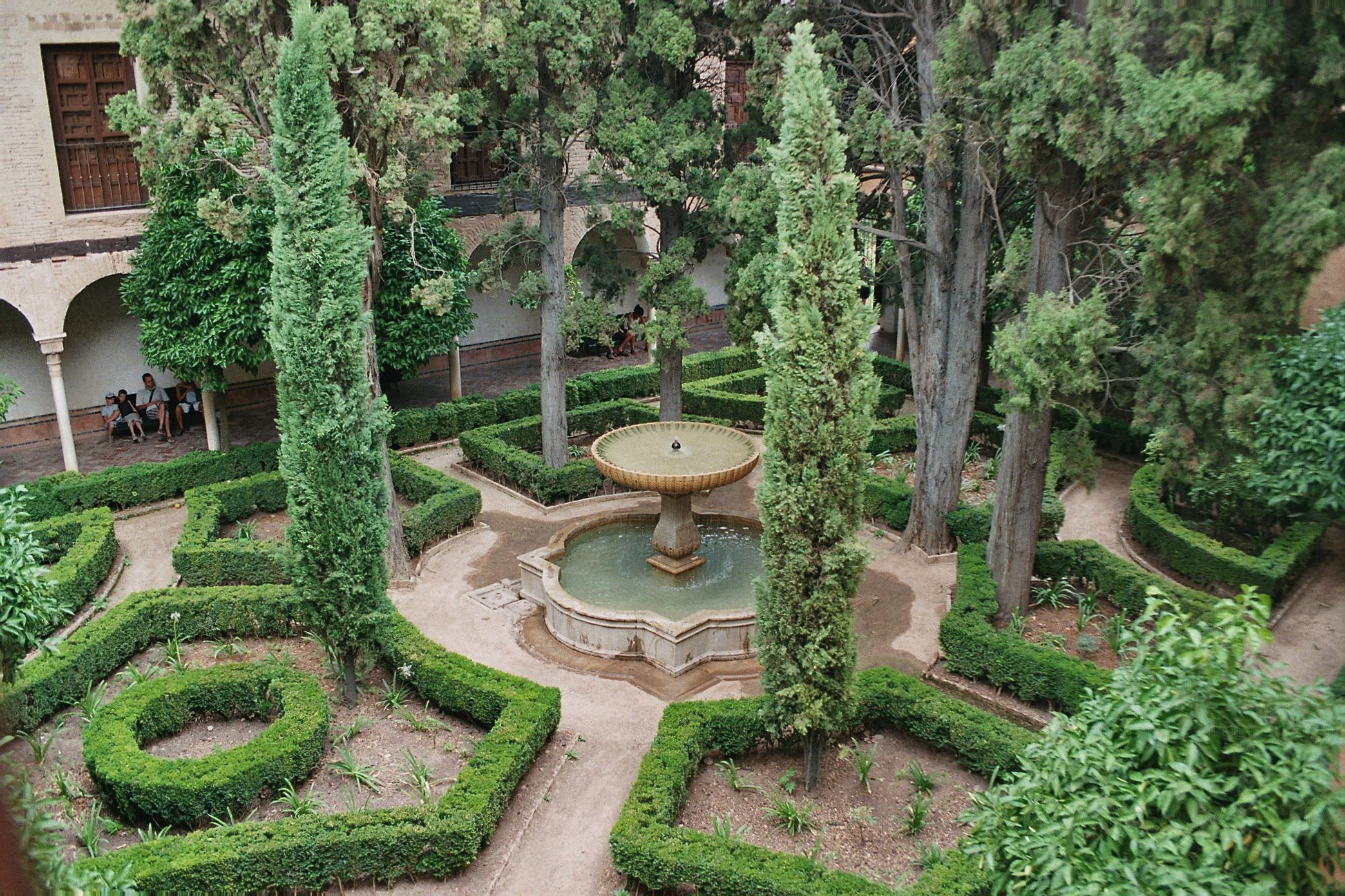
The Patio de Lindaraja was created in the 16th century on the site of a former Nasrid garden just north of the Palace of the Lions.

Granada was conquered by the Catholic Monarchs of Spain in 1492 and the Alhambra became a palace owned by the Spanish monarchy. Like much of the Alhambra, the Palace of the Lions suffered damages and underwent various repairs, restorations, and modifications over time. Under the Catholic Monarchs, it was connected to the Comares Palace by a direct passage for the first time, as it remains today.

Starting in 1528, emperor Charles V commissioned the construction of new apartments in the area to the north of the palace. The former gardens on the north side of the palace, which had allowed for an uninterrupted view of the city on this side, were turned into an enclosed garden during this period, resulting in the present Patio de Lindaraja. Additionally, the original entrance to the Palace of the Lions, on its south side, was suppressed in order to make a connection to the new Renaissance-style Palace of Charles V. Modifications were also made to the fountain inside the Court of the Lions during the second half of the 16th century.

In 1590 the western chamber of the palace, the Sala de los Mocarabes, was destroyed by the explosion of a nearby gunpowder magazine. The room's former muqarnas-vault ceiling, now lost, was eventually replaced by a Baroque-style plaster vault in 1714, designed by painter Blas de Ledesma for the visit of Phillip V and Isabella of Parma.

In the 19th century, probably during the French occupation (1810–1812), the floor of the courtyard was replaced with gardens – although there has been much debate among scholars as to whether gardens had previously existed in the courtyard.

In 1859 the architect Rafael Contreras "restored" the courtyard's eastern pavilion by giving it a spherical dome roof with ceramic tiling, based in part on Iranian architecture. This conformed to what European restorers at the time thought the "Arab style" should look like. The domed roof was disassembled in 1934 by Leopoldo Torres Balbás and replaced with its current pyramidal roof, which set off an international debate about the nature of restorations. Torres Balbás argued for a more scientific approach to restoration, in contrast with the more "stylistic" restoration philosophy of his predecessors. Nonetheless, Torres Balbás's roof is still partly incorrect, as its angles are too steep compared with similar pyramidal roofs in Moorish architecture.

=== Recent restorations ===
In 2002, the Patronato de la Alhambra (the official agency in charge of the historical site) began a major and comprehensive restoration of the Court of the Lions. This involved the temporary removal of the fountain's lion sculptures and modifications to its hydraulic system. The restoration of the fountain and most of the courtyard was completed in 2012. One of the last steps in the restoration was the replacement of the courtyard's previous gravel flooring with a pavement of Macael marble flagstones, a decision based on the study of historical archives and on new archeological investigations showing that the underlying rock bed would have made the topsoil too thin for gardens. A recent study of some of the muqarnas compositions around Court of the Lions was able to identify deformations and imperfections that have occurred due to the many repairs and restorations that took place across generations. The Sala de los Reyes is still undergoing further restoration work. A project to restore its three painted leather ceilings was completed in 2018, while a new project to restore the stucco decoration below these ceilings began in July 2022.

Restorations of the Court of the Lions over time

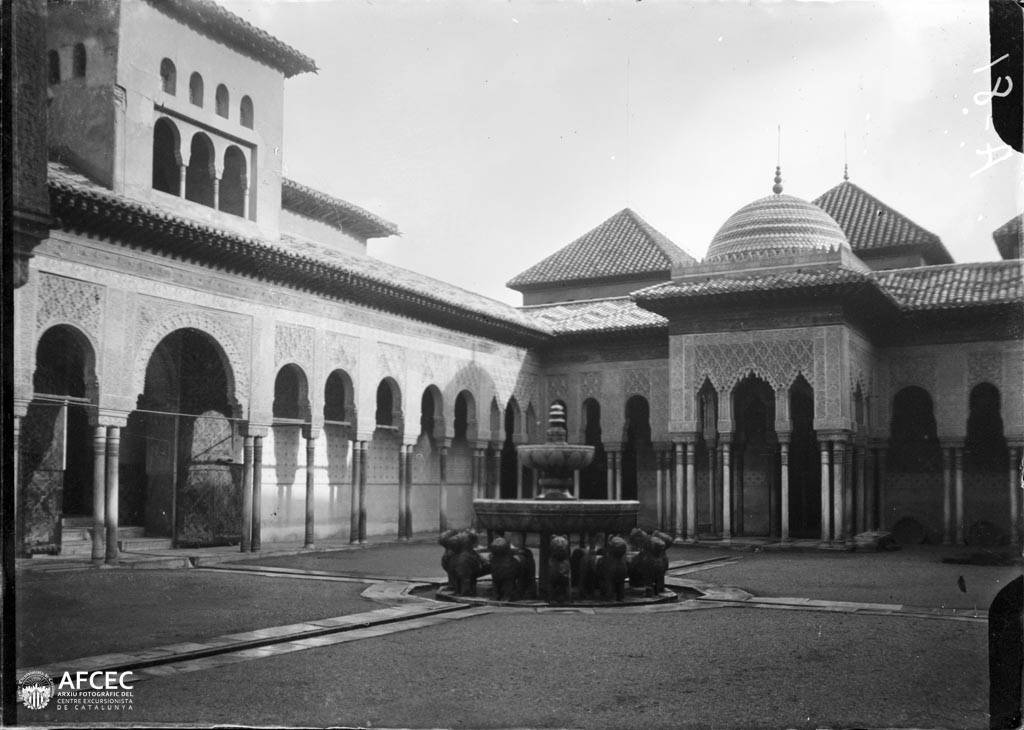
Court of the Lions in 1910, before 20th-century restorations. The upper sections of the fountain were added in the 16th century and the dome roof of the pavilion was added in 1859.

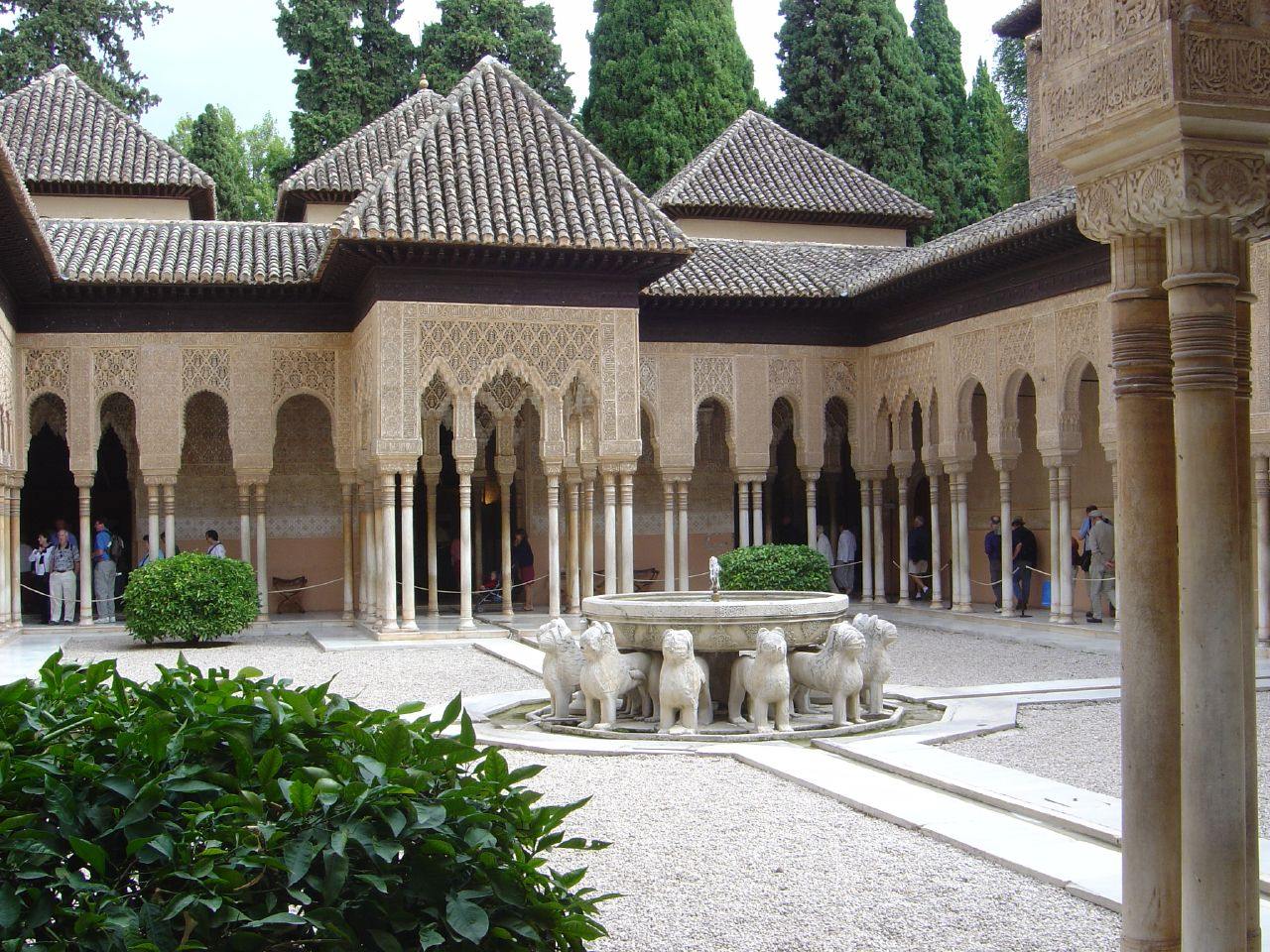
Court of the Lions in 2003, before most recent restoration. Most of the floor was occupied by beds of gravel. The domed roof and the fountain upper sections were removed in the 20th century.

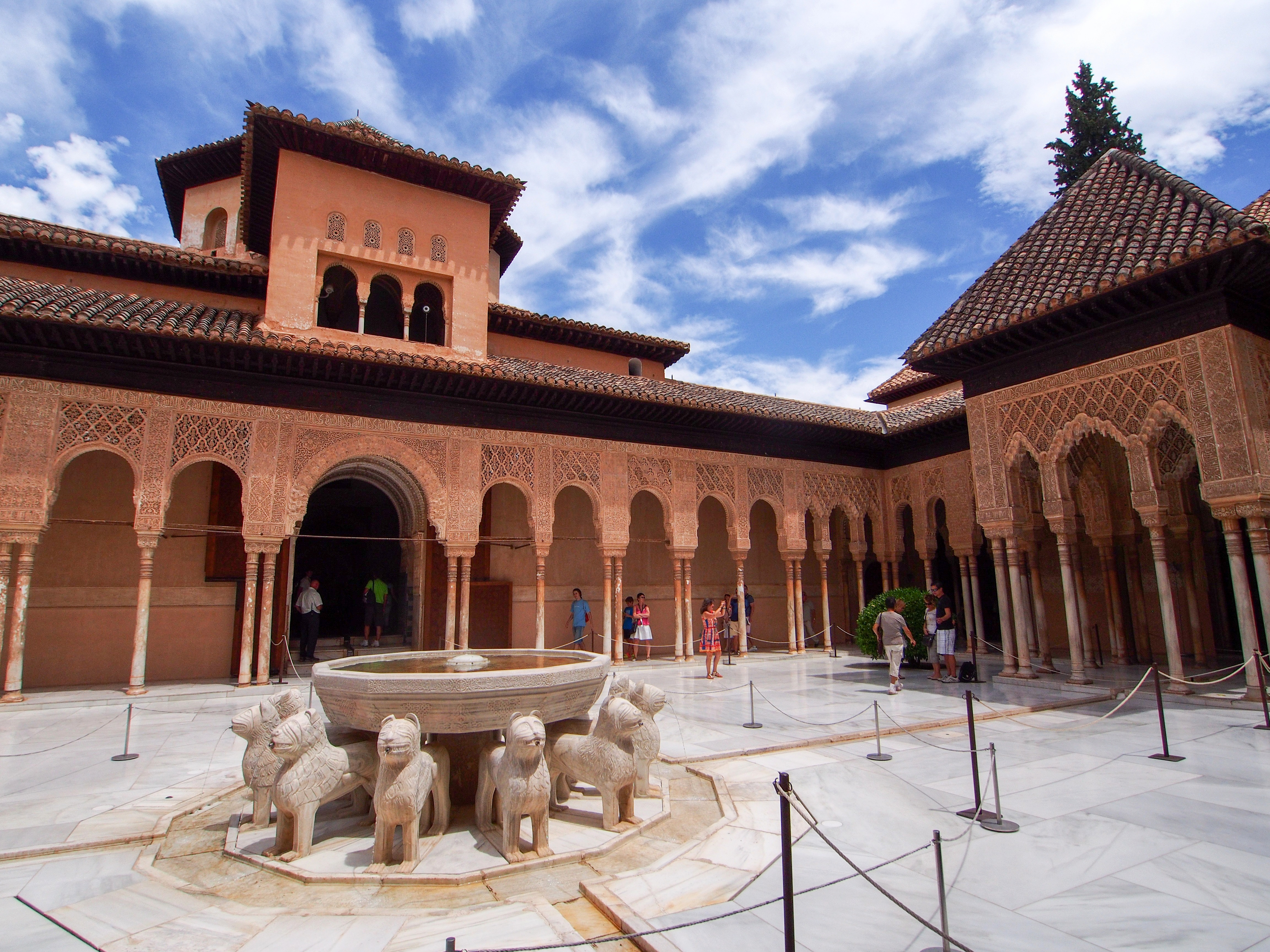
Court of the Lions in 2013, after most recent restoration. The entire floor is now paved in white marble. The water spout at the center of the fountain has been replaced with a replica of the fountain's original hydraulic component.

== Description of the palace ==
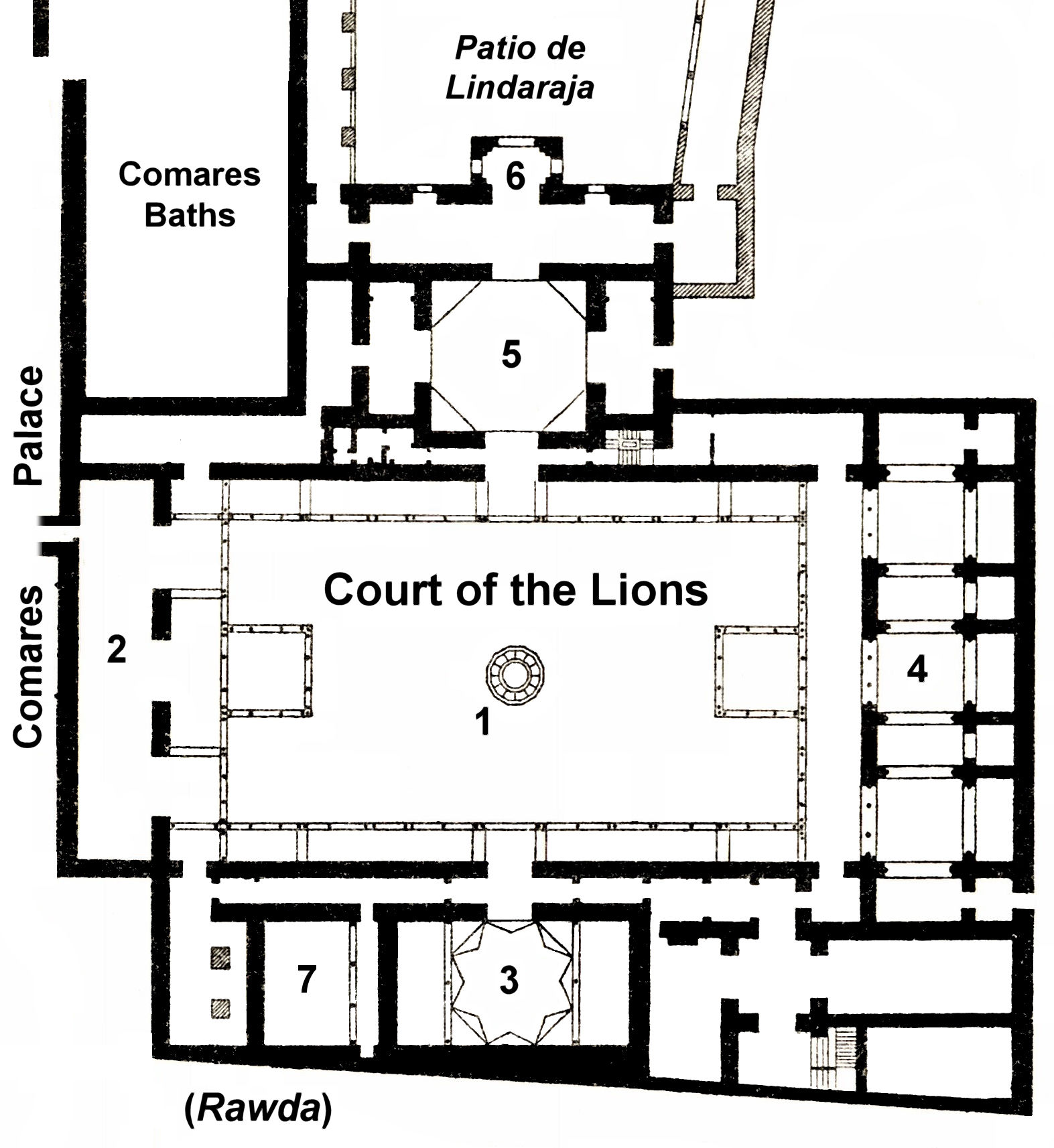
General floor plan of the Palace of the Lions: 1) Fountain of the Lions, 2) Sala de los Mocárabes, 3) Sala de los Abencerrajes, 4) Sala de los Reyes, 5) Sala de Dos Hermanas, 6) Mirador de Lindaraja, 7) Patio del Harén

The palace is centered on a rectangular courtyard, which is surrounded on four sides by chambers and an arcaded gallery or portico. Many of the names for individual rooms were coined in Spanish after the end of the Reconquista and have little to do with any original Arabic names.

=== The courtyard (Patio de los Leones) ===
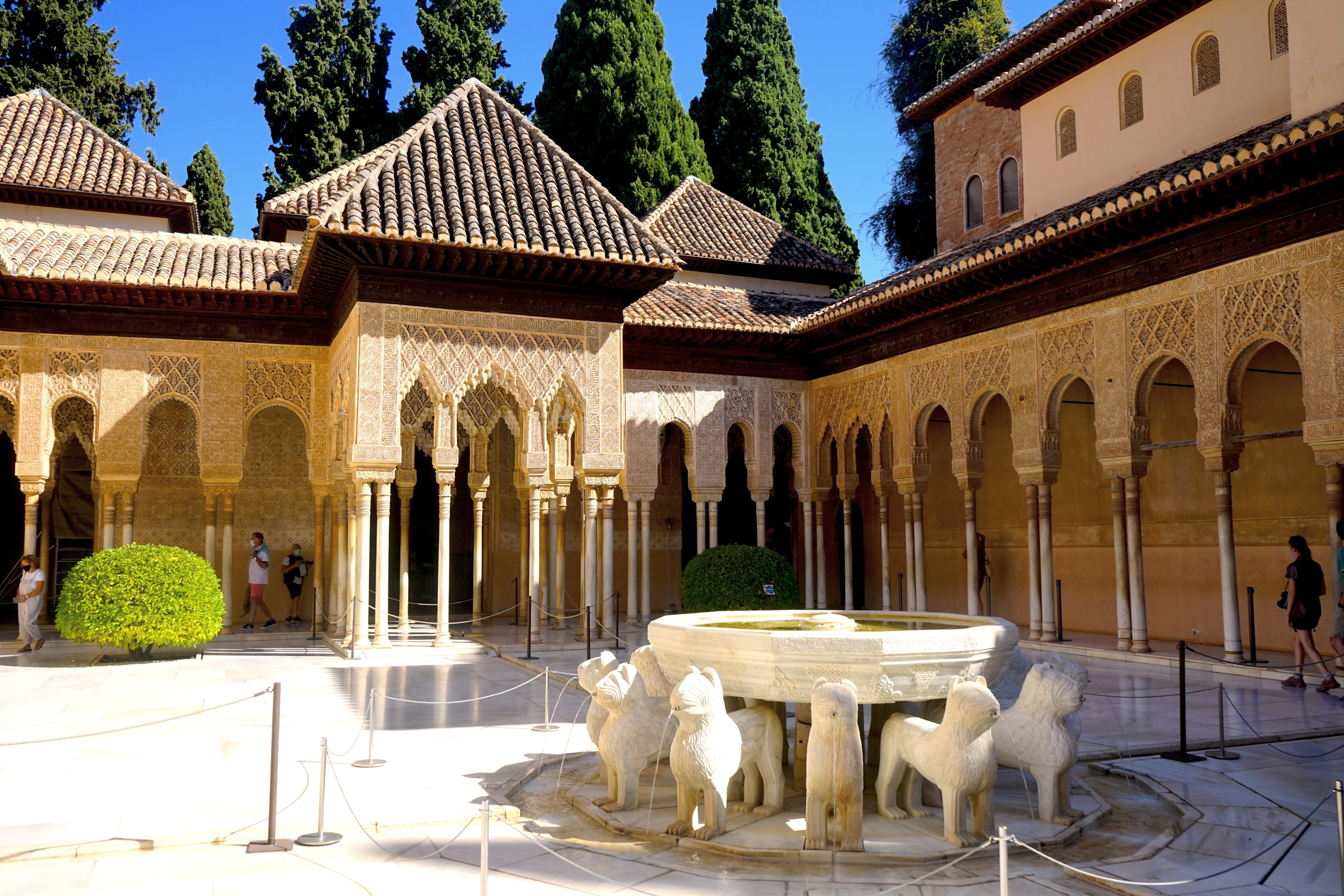
Court of the Lions and its fountain (2021 photo)

The rectangular courtyard measures about 28.7 meters long and 15.6 meters wide, with its long axis aligned roughly east-to-west. The arches and columns of the surrounding portico are arranged in a complex pattern that is unique in the architecture of the Islamic world. Single columns alternate with groups of two or three columns to forming a visual rhythm that highlights certain parts of the façade. Each column or group of columns demarcates a bay: there are 17 bays on the north and south sides of the courtyard and 11 bays on the east and west sides. On the north and south sides, the central bay is wider than all the others as it leads to the entrance of the hall behind it. On the east and west sides, a pavilion structure projects into the courtyard from the portico. It has been argued by Georges Marçais that the spacing of columns and arches was set to the golden ratio, but there is no strong evidence that Muslim architects ever used it. Instead, as Antonio Fernández-Puertas postulates, the rectangles used in the construction may have been based on square roots and surds.

The pavilions are also supported by slender columns forming three bays of different sizes on each side of the pavilion, with the middle bay slightly wider than the two side bays. At the corners of the pavilion the columns meet in groups of three. The pavilions have pyramidal roofs covering a wooden dome ceiling inside it. The wooden domes feature geometric patterns similar in style to the wooden ceilings in other parts of the Alhambra like the Hall of the Ambassadors.

The arcades of the porticos and the pavilions feature intricately carved stucco decoration, known as yesería in Spanish. A sebka motif – a stylized lozenge-like motif – fills the spaces above the arches and between the columns, accompanied by further vegetal arabesques, other abstract motifs, and muqarnas sculpting. There are also Arabic inscriptions, including the repetition of the Nasrid motto "wa la ghaliba illa-llah" (Arabic: ولا غالب إلا الله, lit. 'And there is no conqueror but God').

The courtyard also features a sophisticated system of water channels, fountains, and basins. At the center of the southern hall, the northern hall, and the eastern and western porticoes is a small fountain at ground level with a round basin from which a water channel runs across the marble floor along the central axes of the courtyard. Additional fountains with basins are situated at the center of the pavilions, along these channels, and separately at the corners of the western and eastern porticoes. The four water channels intersect at the center of the courtyard, where the famed Fountain of the Lions stands. This fountain consists of a large elevated basin surrounded by twelve stylized lion sculptures, all carved from marble.

Elements and details in the Court of the Lions

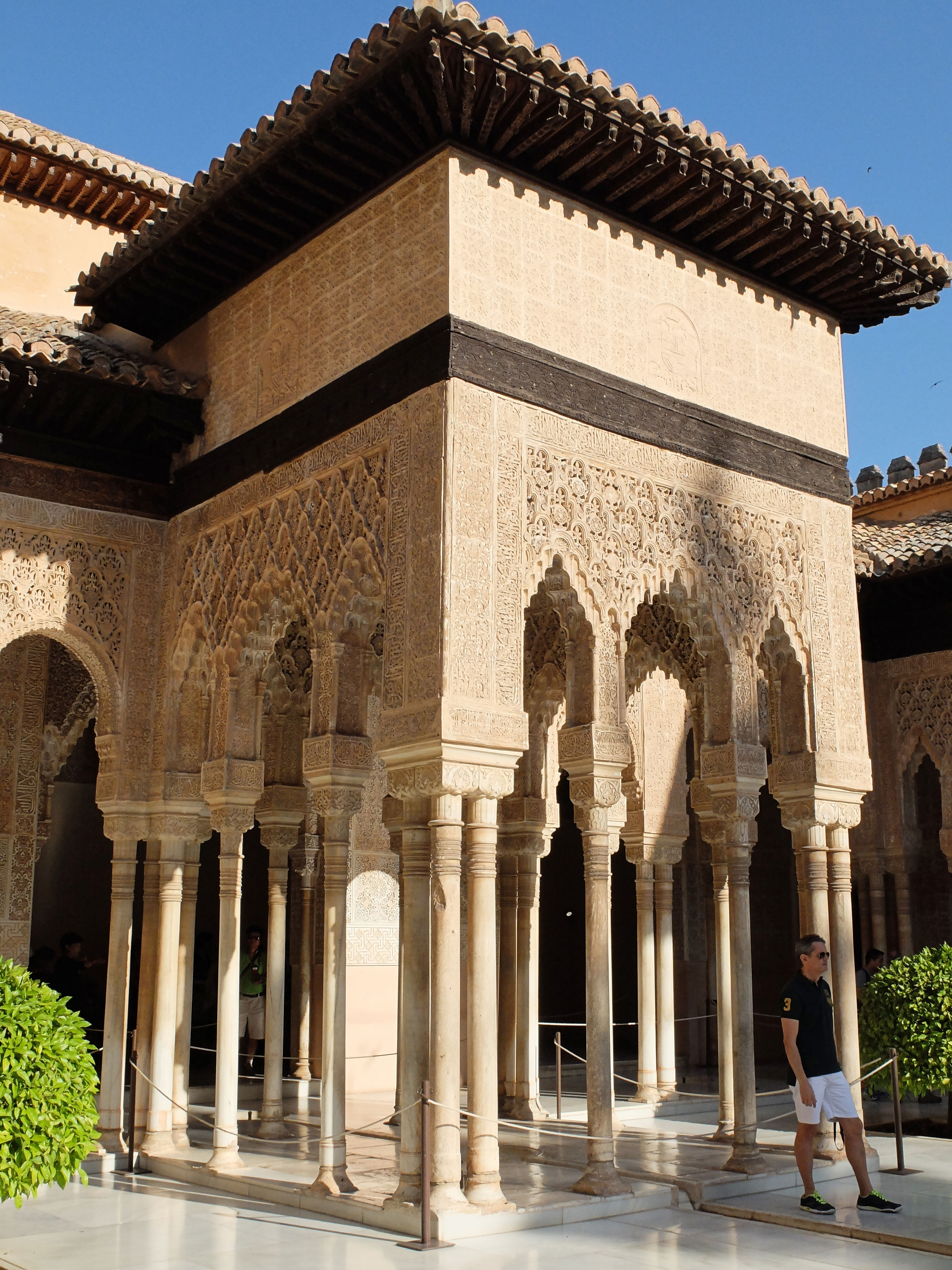
Western pavilion

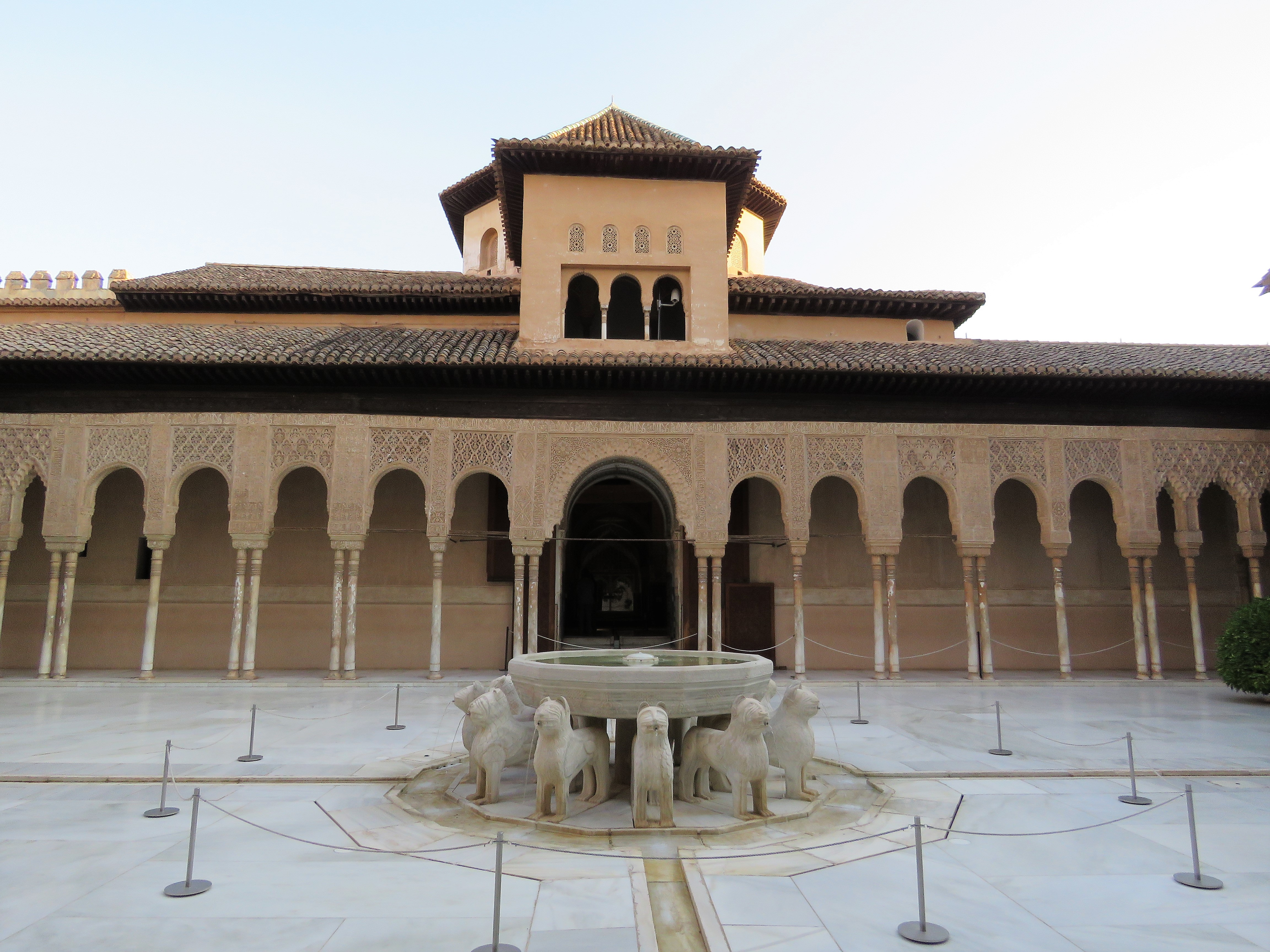
Northern gallery of the courtyard, looking towards the entrance of the Sala de Dos Hermanas

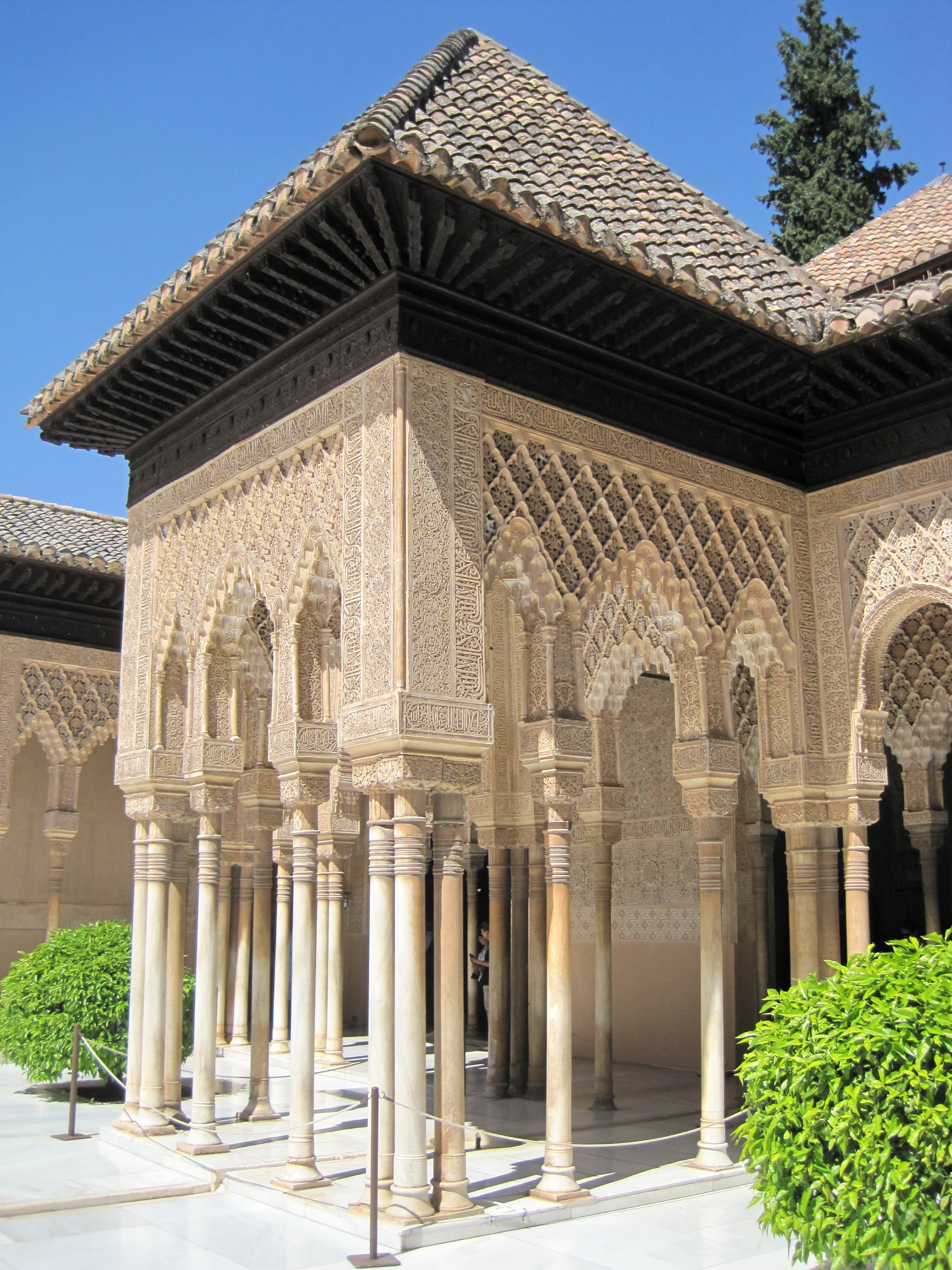
Eastern pavilion

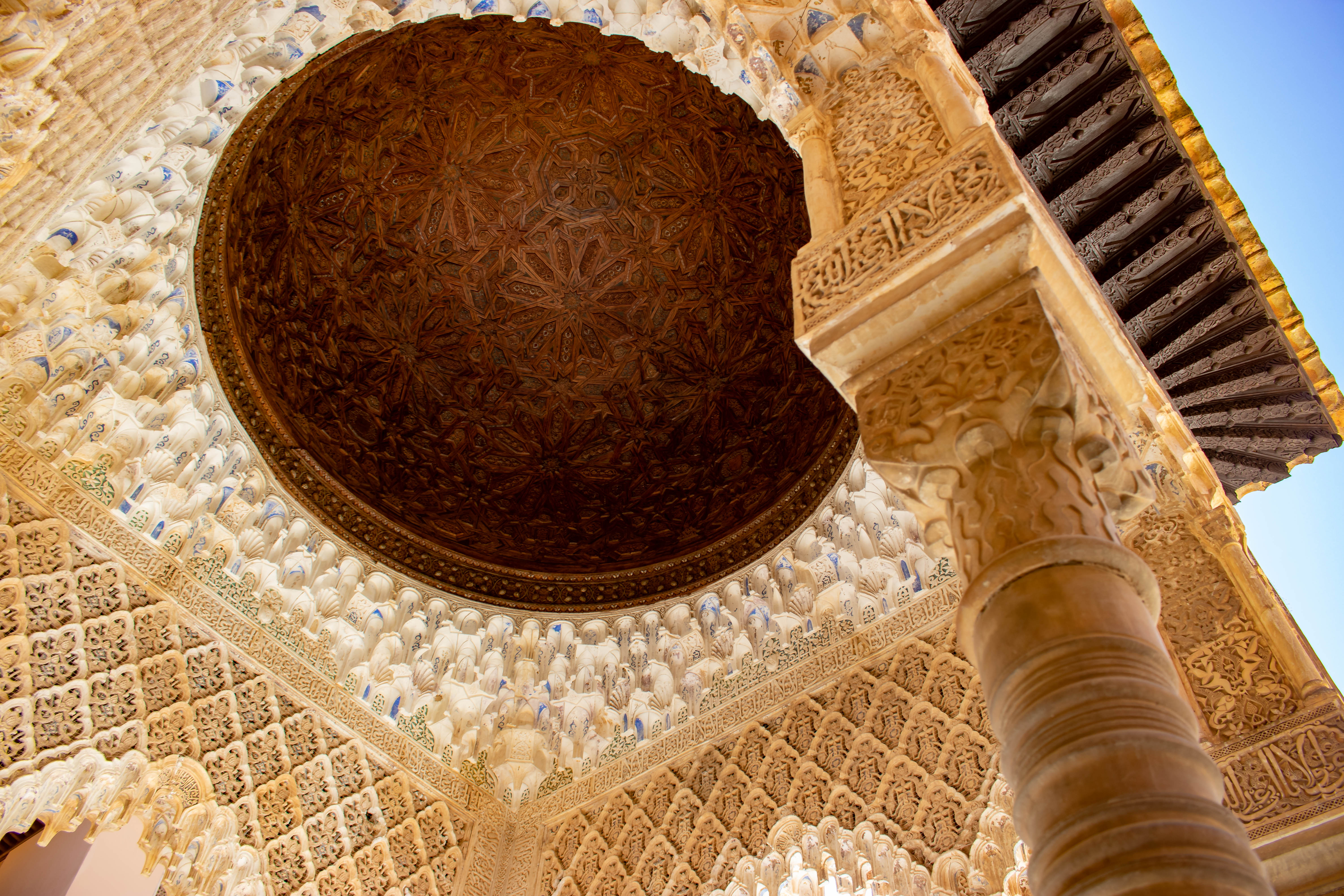
Inside one of the pavilions, with view of the wooden dome

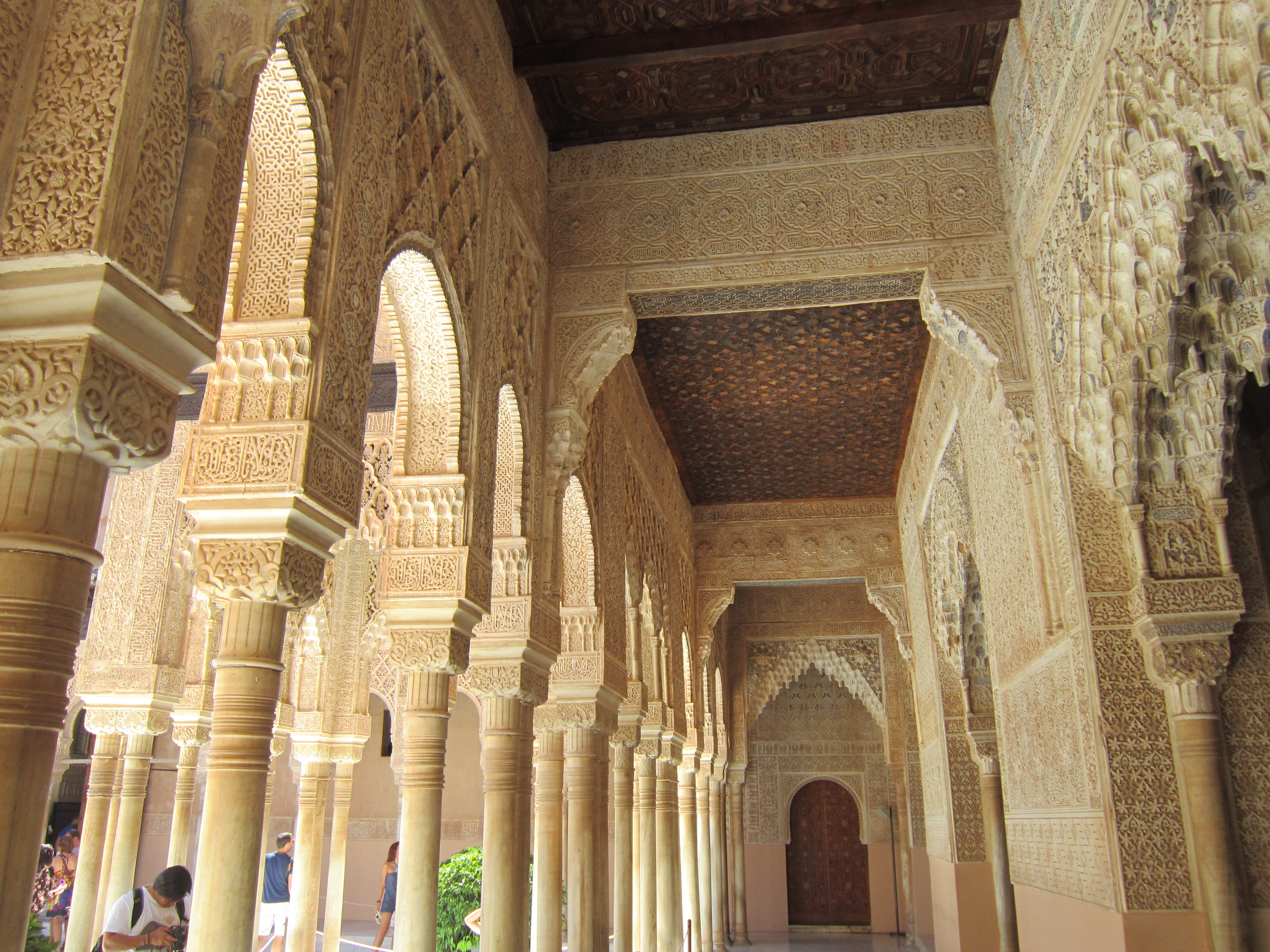
Inside one of the galleries around the courtyard (west side)

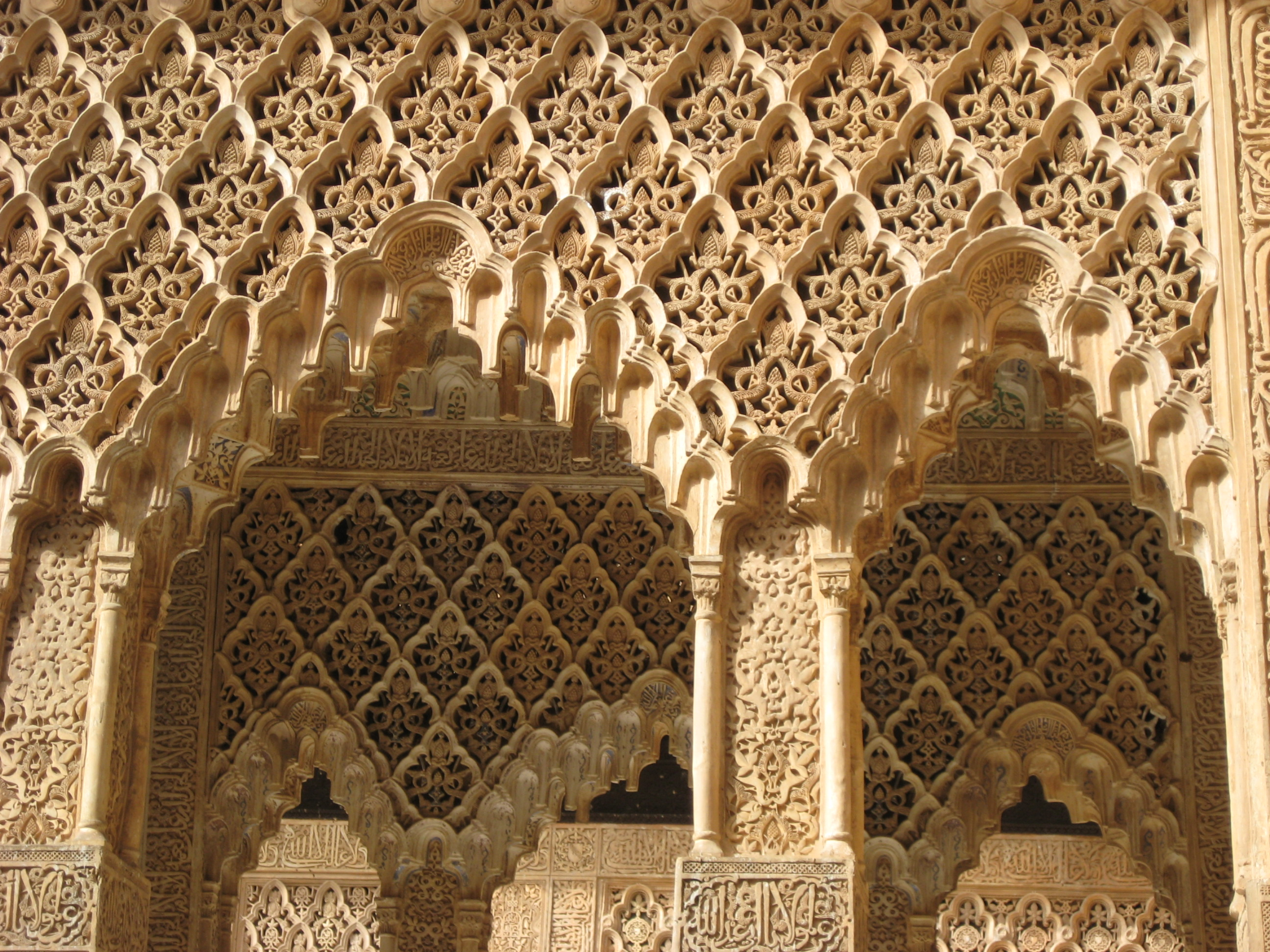
Details of the stucco yeseria decoration, with sebka motif, arabesques, and muqarnas sculpting

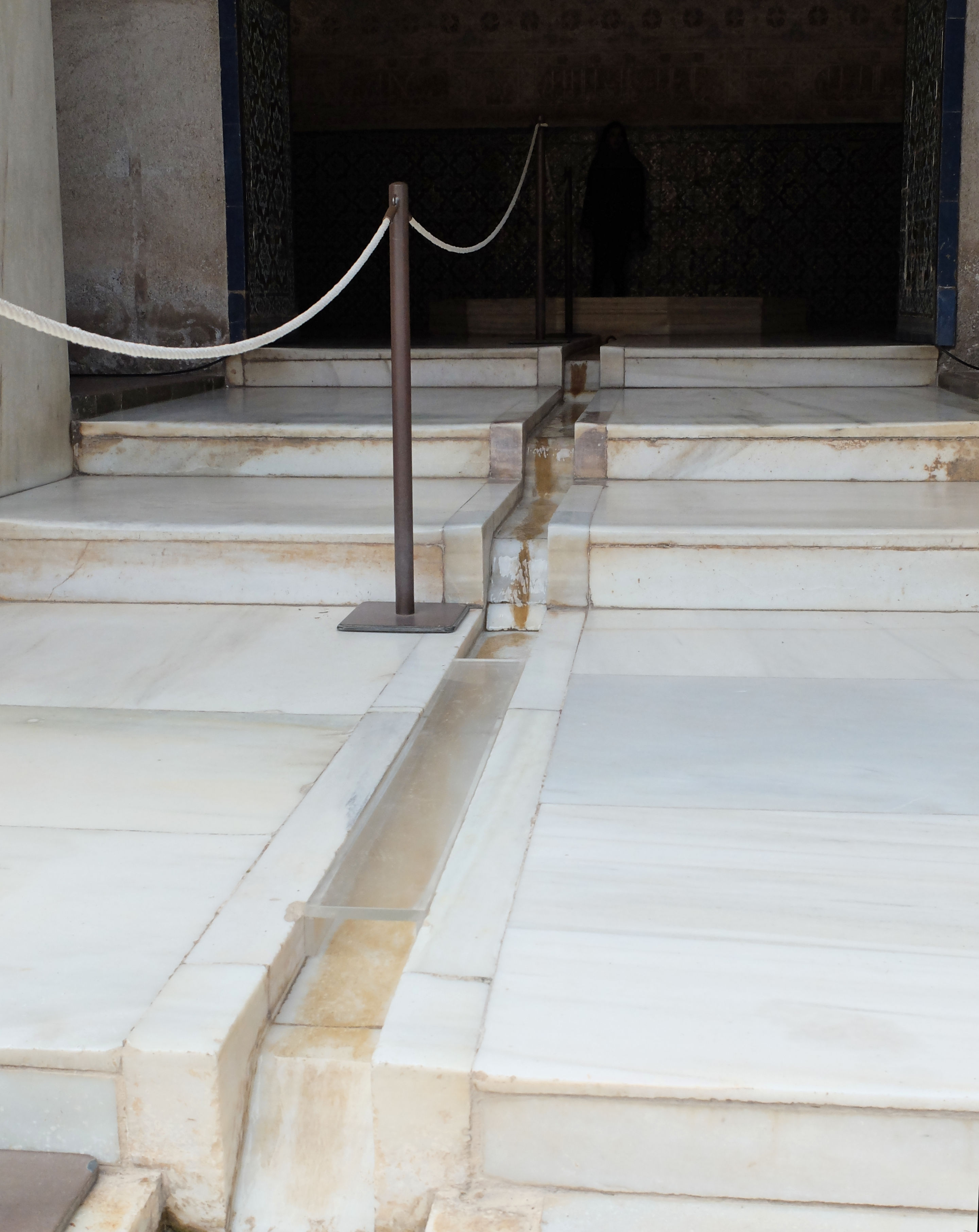
One of the four channels that bring water towards the center of the courtyard

=== The Sala de los Moçárabes ===
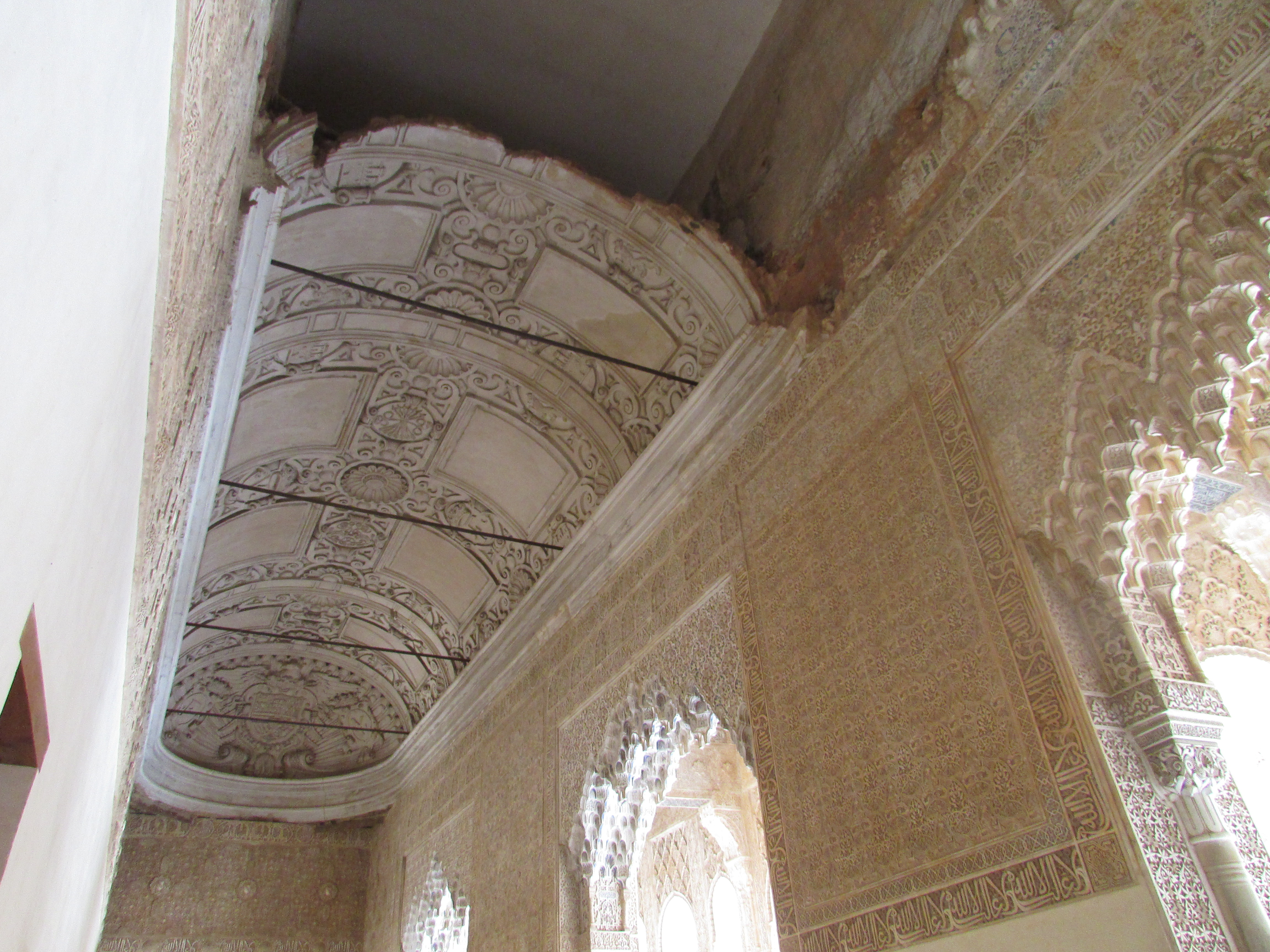
The 18th-century ceiling (partly damaged) of the Sala de los Moçárabes, with muqarnas archways on the right

The chamber on the western side of the courtyard, through which visitors enter the Court of the Lions today, is known as the Sala de los Moçárabes or "Hall of the moçárabes (muqarnas)". It is a narrow rectangular hall. Originally, it was covered by a ceiling of muqarnas vaults and was considered one of the most beautiful rooms in the Alhambra. However, in 1590 the chamber was largely destroyed by the explosion of a nearby gunpowder magazine. The ceiling was eventually replaced by the current Baroque-style plaster vault in 1714, designed by Spanish painter Blas de Ledesma. The hall is connected to the rest of the courtyard via three muqarnas archways.

=== The Sala de los Abencerrajes and the Patio del Harén ===
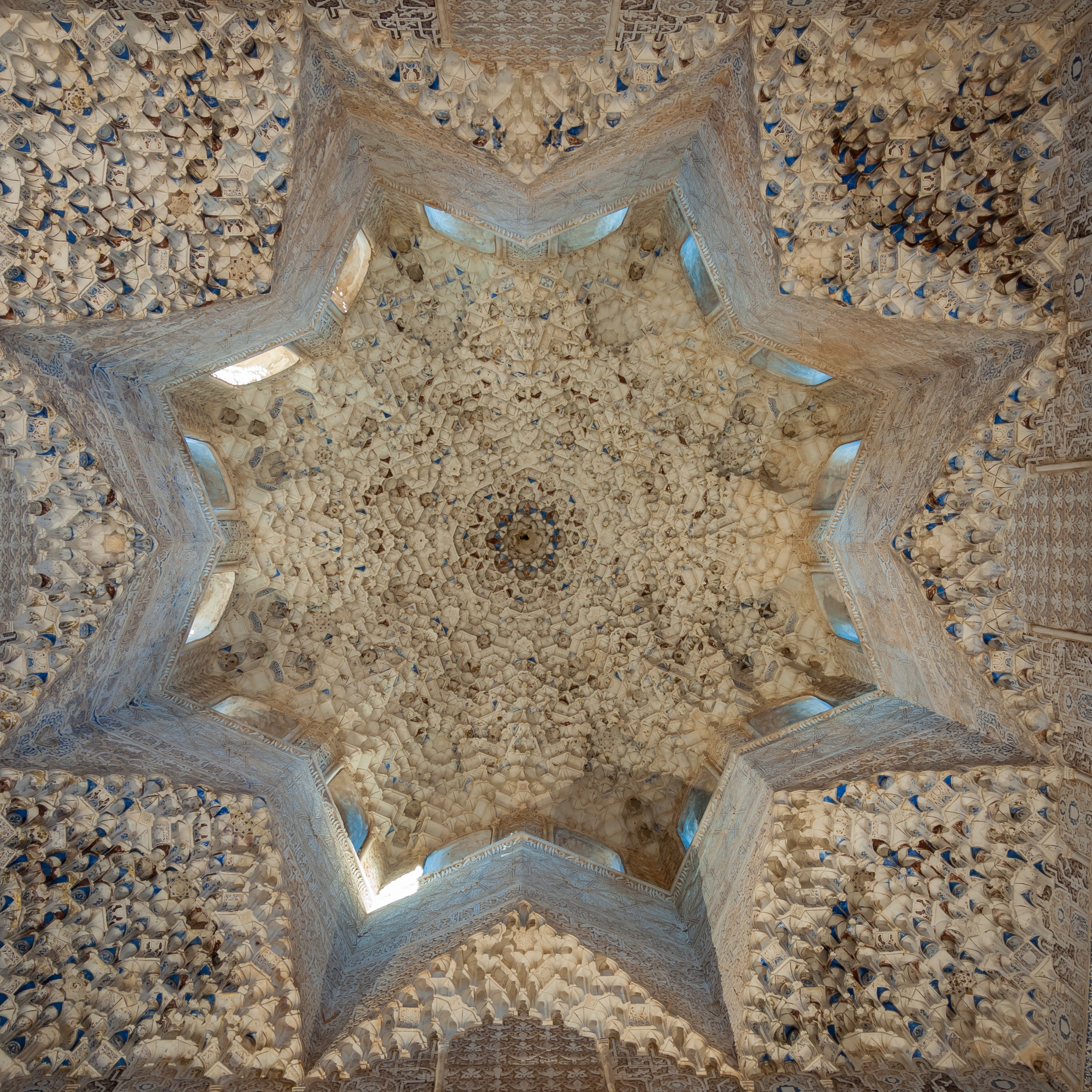
The cupola and muqarnas ceiling of the Sala de los Abencerrajes

The hall accessed on the south side of the courtyard has been known since either the 16th century or the 19th century as the Sala de los Abencerrajes or "Hall of the Abencerrajes". This name derives from the powerful Abencerrajes family (Banu Sarraj in Arabic) who played a political role in the emirate, but there is no actual historical relation between the family and this chamber. Its original name in Arabic was al-Qubba al-Ġarbīya ("the Western Dome"). The reasons for this name are unclear, but it may have been called that in relation to the dome of the Palacio del Partal Alto, a palace further east near the present Partal Palace.

The hall consists of a central square space, acting almost like another courtyard, which is flanked by two niche-like side chambers. This kind of layout found in many other palace halls across the Alhambra. The side chambers are separate from the central space by double arches. A short corridor, passing through multiple archways, separates the hall from the Court of the Lions. On an upper floor above this corridor is a small chamber with a window overlooking the courtyard, similar to a mirador (lookout). The main central space of the hall is covered by a highly elaborate three-dimensional muqarnas dome ceiling, featuring a 16-sided cupola in the shape of an eight-pointed star. The cupola and the transitional zones around its base are all filled with muqarnas. Each of the cupola's 16 sides is pierced by a window. Inscriptions in the hall by Ibn Zamrak compare this dome to the heavens, the sun, the moon, and the stars. The upper walls of the chamber are covered in more stucco decoration, while the lower walls are covered with tile decoration. The original tiles were replaced in the 16th century with contemporary tiles from Seville.

A small passageway nearby leads to the upper floor where there were additional rooms and a latrine. These rooms are not usually accessible to tourists today. One of the chambers is a courtyard known as the Patio del Harén ("Courtyard of the Harem"), located above and just west of the Sala de los Abencerrajes. It was part of an independent apartment which could be accessed from the palace's original street entrance. It is also located above a cistern which supplied water for the nearby Comares Baths. This courtyard is flanked by two arcades of three arches that feature marble columns topped by capitals carved in serpentine, which are unique in the Alhambra. Fragments of original fresco decoration are also preserved on the lower walls. Another nearby element, slightly to the east, is the Puerta de la Rauda ("Gate of the Rawda"), a horseshoe-arch doorway topped by a dome. No longer accessible to general visitors today, this was probably the original entrance to the palace before the 16th century.

Details of the Sala de los Abencerrajes and adjacent structures

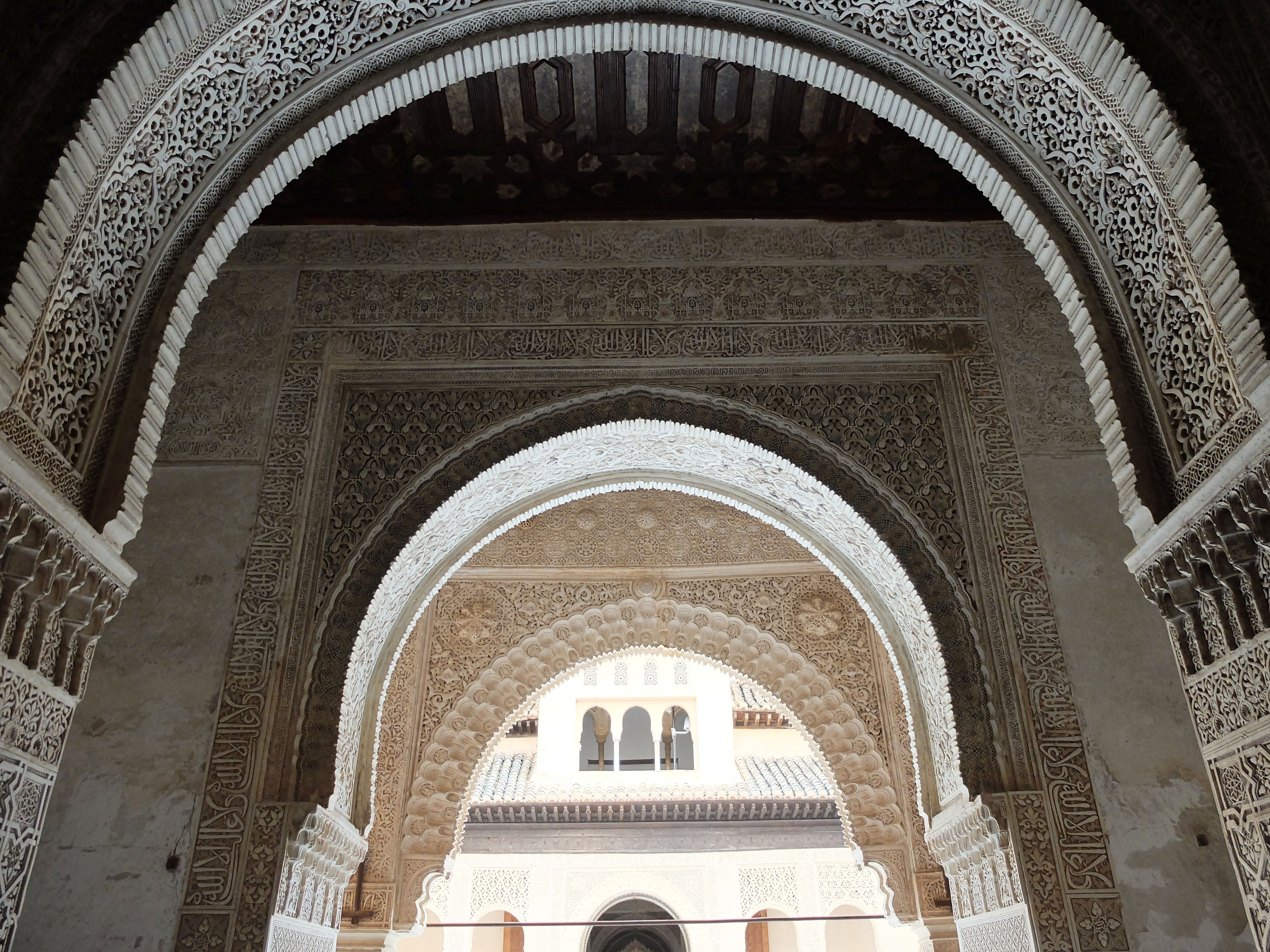
Corridor and arches at the entrance to the Sala de los Abencerrajes

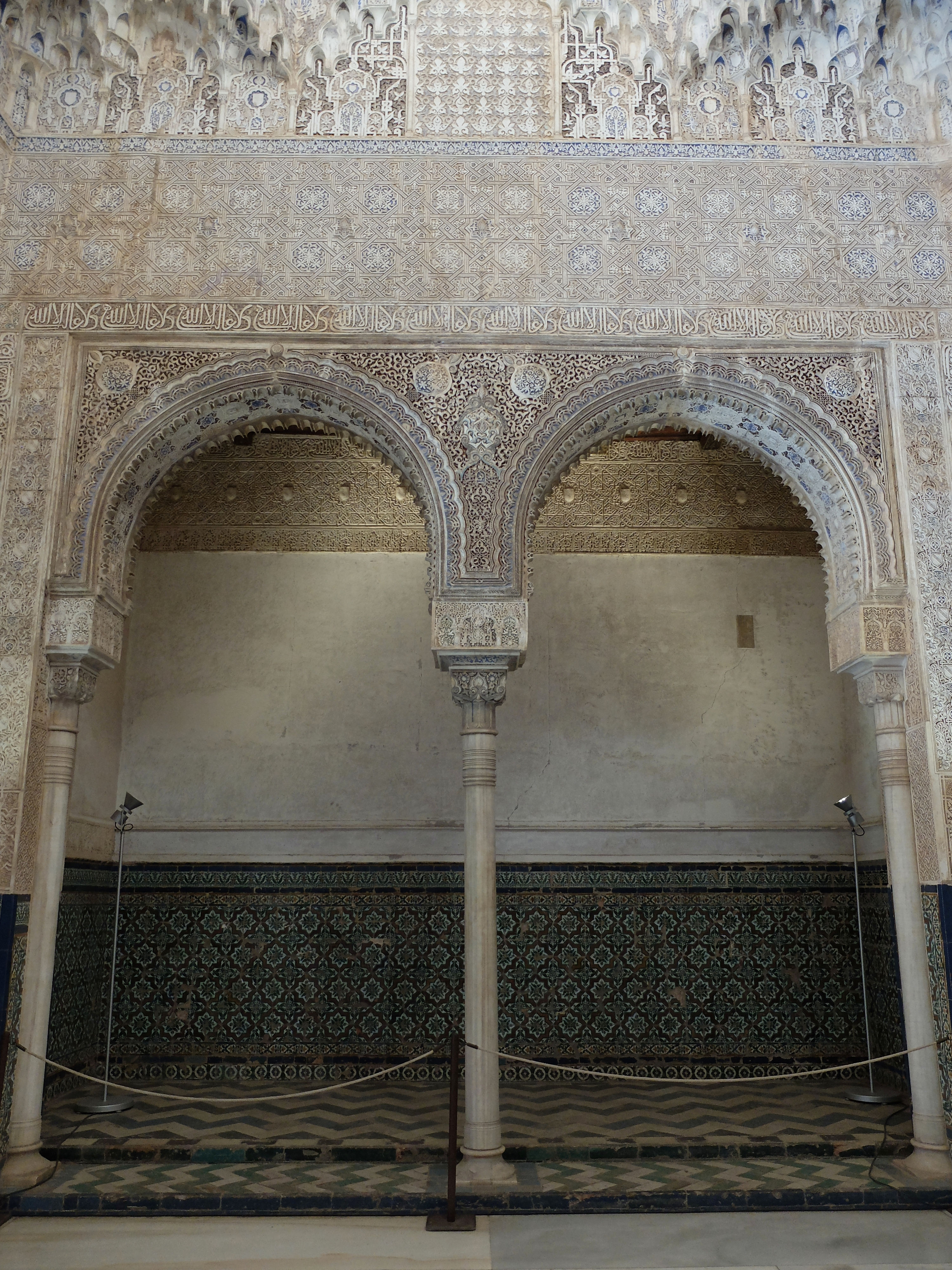
Arches leading to a side chamber in the Sala de los Abencerrajes

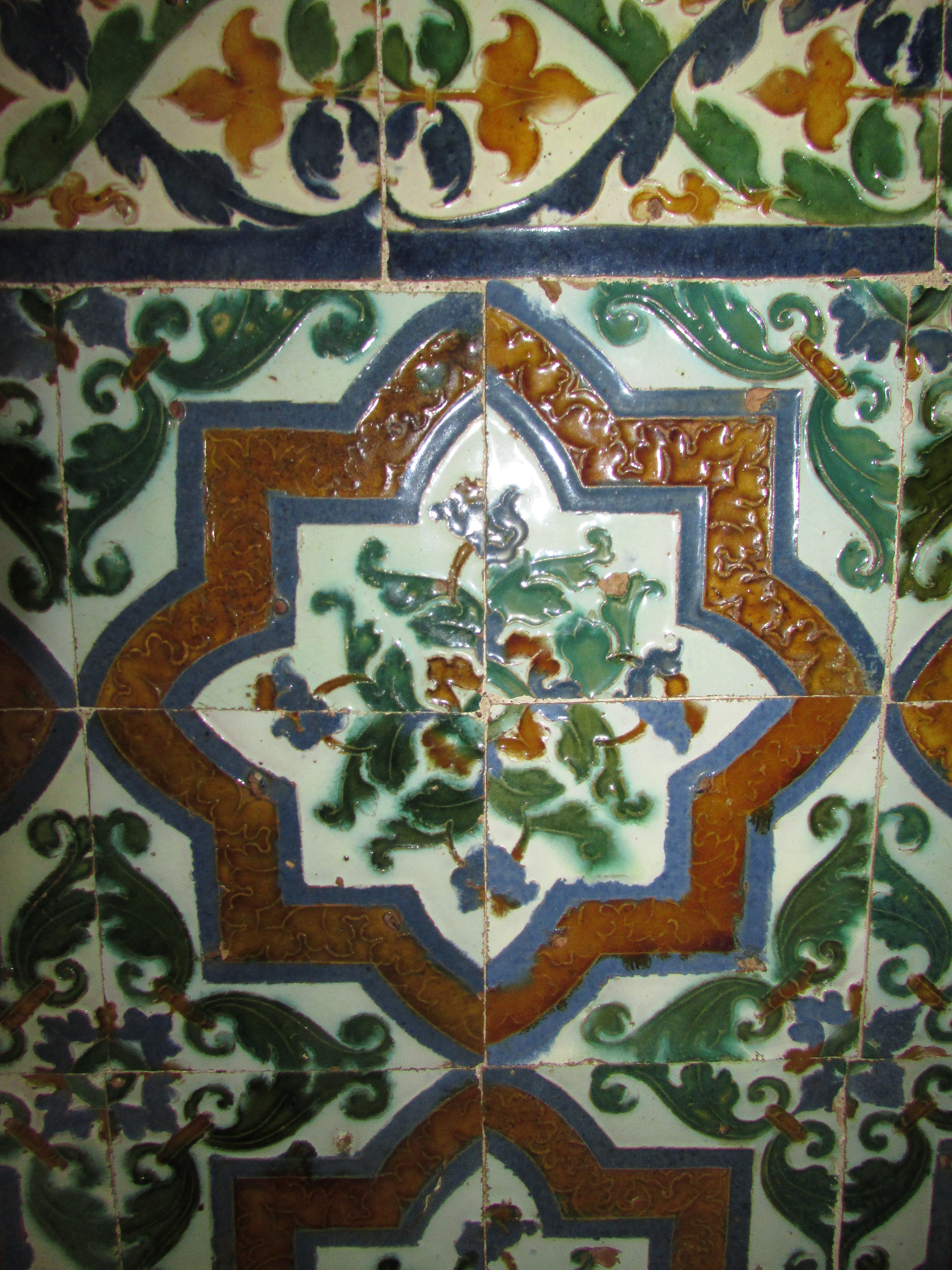
16th-century Sevillan tiles on the lower walls

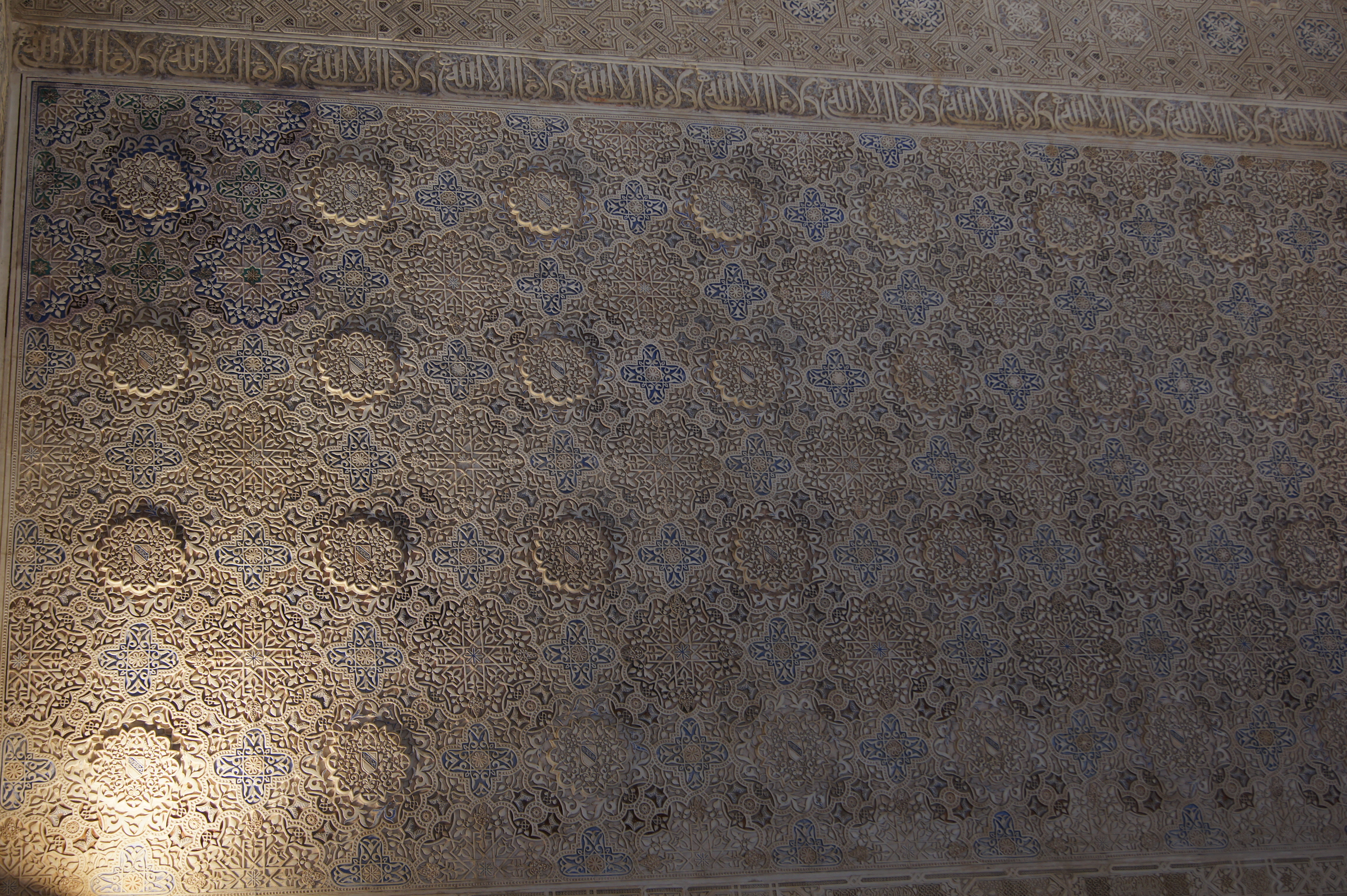
Stucco decoration on the upper walls of the hall

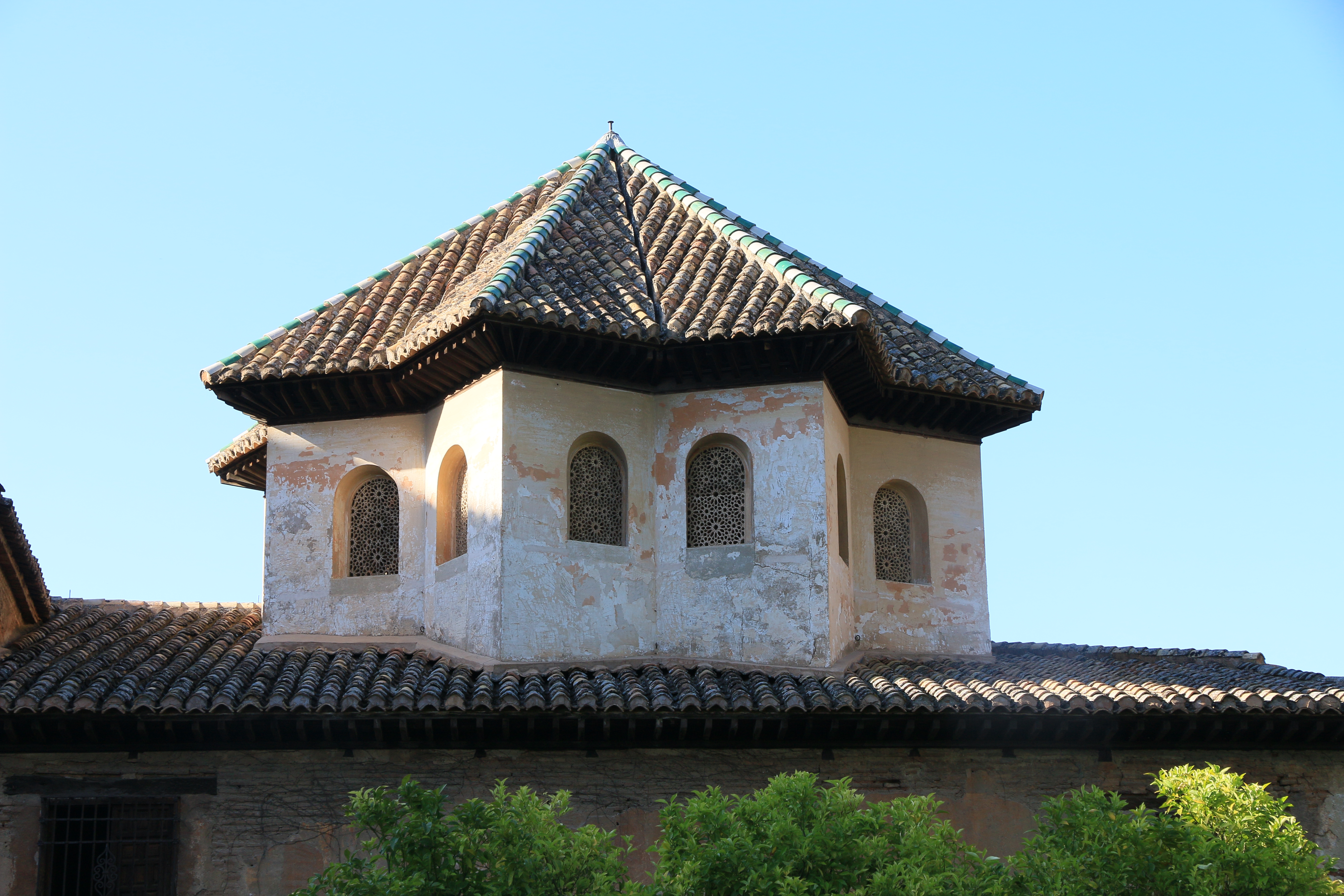
Cupola of the Sala de los Abencerrajes, seen from outside

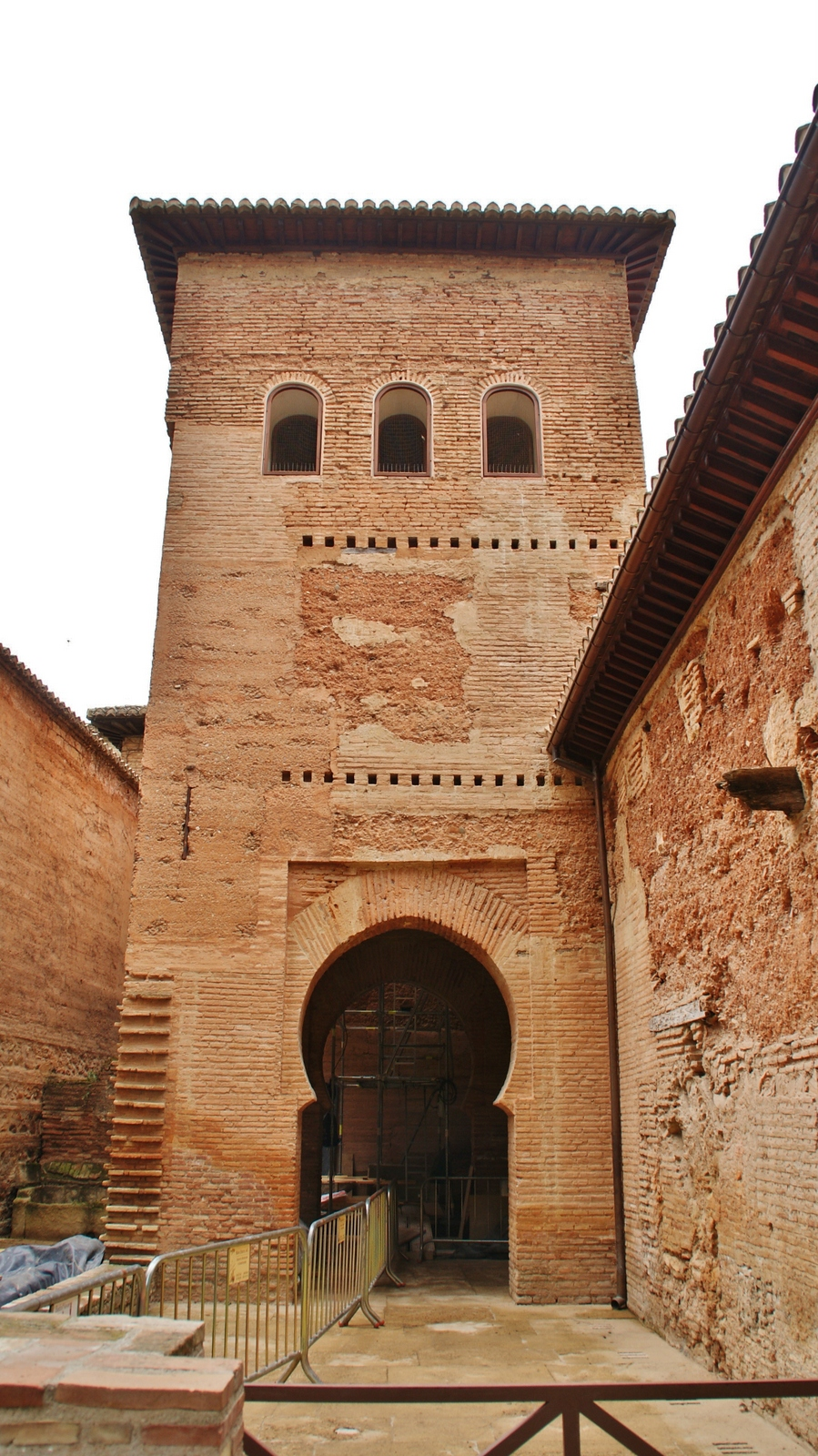
The Puerta de la Rauda, a former gate on the south side of the palace

=== The Sala de los Reyes ===
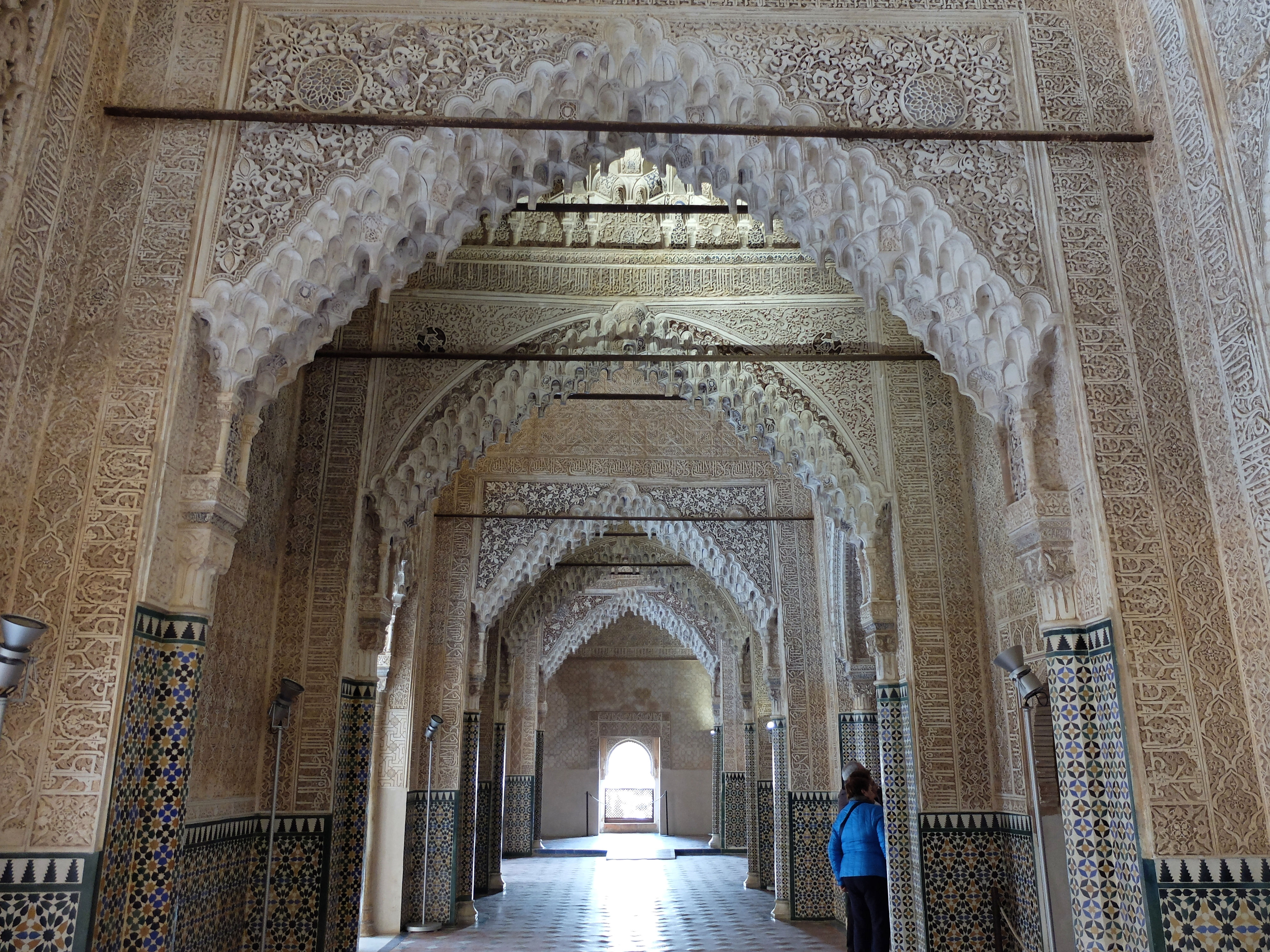
The Sala de los Reyes (Hall of Kings), looking north

The hall on the eastern side of the courtyard is known as the Sala de los Reyes or "Hall of Kings". This hall is essentially a wide rectangular space, but it has a more complicated subdivision in comparison with the other rooms of the palace. The hall is divided into seven sub-units by muqarnas arches. Each of these sub-units is covered by its own muqarnas vault ceiling. Three of the sub-units are square chambers and their muqarnas vaults are set within a cupola pierced with windows, which brings in more light. These chambers are open to the courtyard via a triple archway sculpted with more muqarnas. The other four sub-units are smaller and rectangular in shape, serving as either transitional spaces between the square chambers or as side chambers at opposite ends of the hall.

Each of the seven sub-units of the hall is accompanied by a niche-like chamber of equal width behind it (on its eastern side). The three larger chambers are each covered with a rounded vault ceiling made of wooden planks. The surface of the ceiling is covered with leather that has been painted with pictorial scenes. Pictorial scenes are relatively rare in Islamic art (with the exception of miniatures) and scholars generally agree, based on their Gothic-like style, that these paintings were probably executed by Christian artists from a Spanish court (probably the court of Pedro of Castile in Seville). Another theory by art historian Jerrilynn Dodds is that they were executed by Muslims who worked from Christian objects, in a mix-and-match of Christian Romantic motifs. The painting in the middle chamber shows a group of ten Muslim men in noble garb sitting on cushions and engaged in a discussion or debate. Multiple identifications have been proposed for the figures, with one hypothesis being that they depict ten Nasrid sultans, while other possibilities include ten sages, writers from different eras, or scholars representing the various sciences. This scene, because it seems to show the ruler or "king", inspired the hall's current name. The paintings in the other two chambers show scenes of court life, including a jousting competition and hunting scenes, set amidst a landscape of gardens and palaces.

After the Reconquista, the Sala de los Reyes was used as a chapel and as a headquarters for the parish of Santa Maria de la Alhambra while the church of the same name was being built nearby (over the site of the previous mosque) during the 16th century. In 1855 Rafael Contreras significantly modified the roof the hall by the addition of new individual roofs on top of each of the painted wooden roofs, replacing the former common roof that protected all three of them. This resulted in poor ventilation and caused the paintings to deteriorate. In 2006, as part of the ongoing major restoration of the palace, the original wooden roofs were restored and steps were taken to prevent further damage. The paintings themselves underwent a restoration process which was completed in 2018.

Ceilings of the Sala de los Reyes

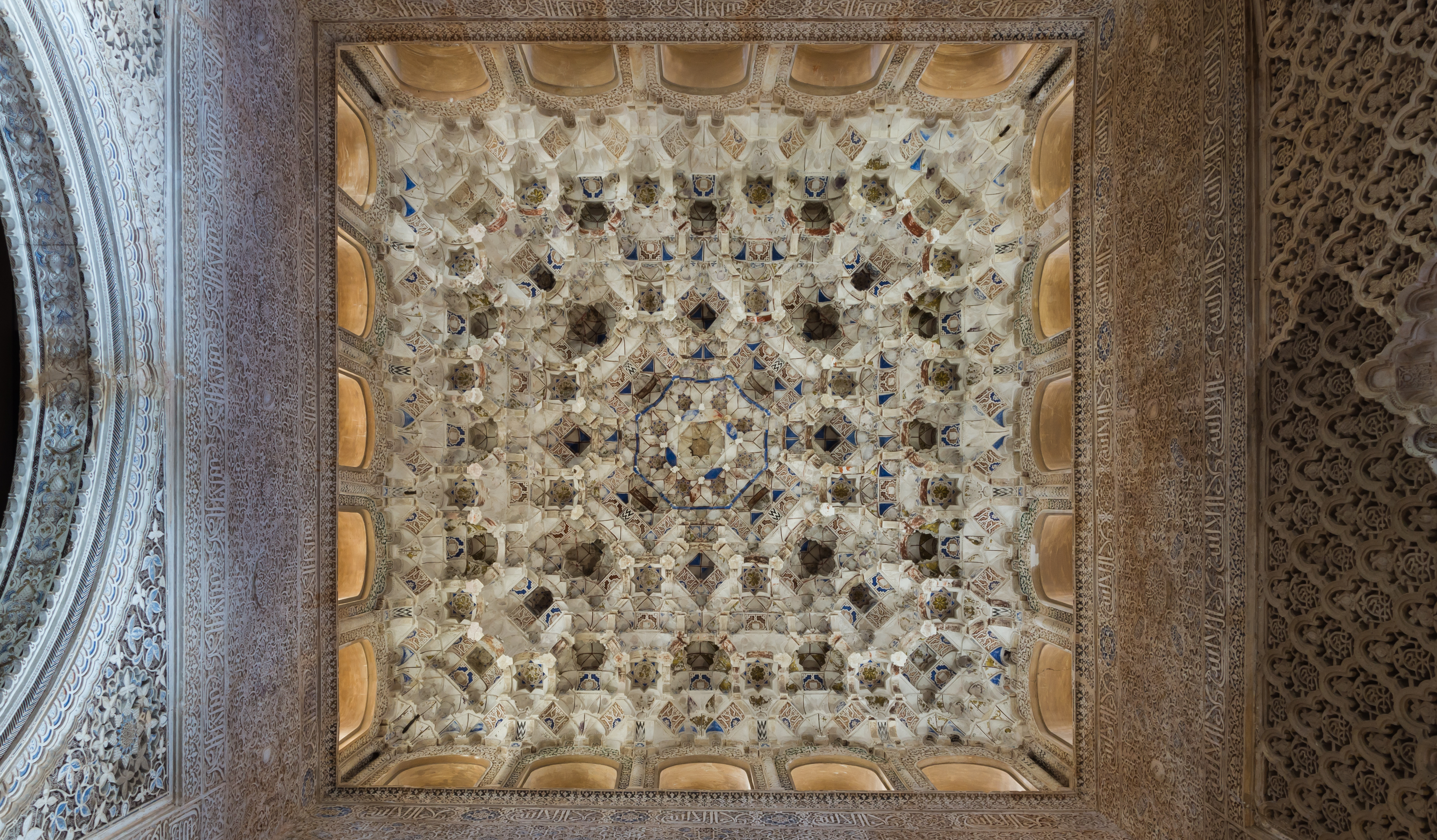
One of the muqarnas cupolas in the hall

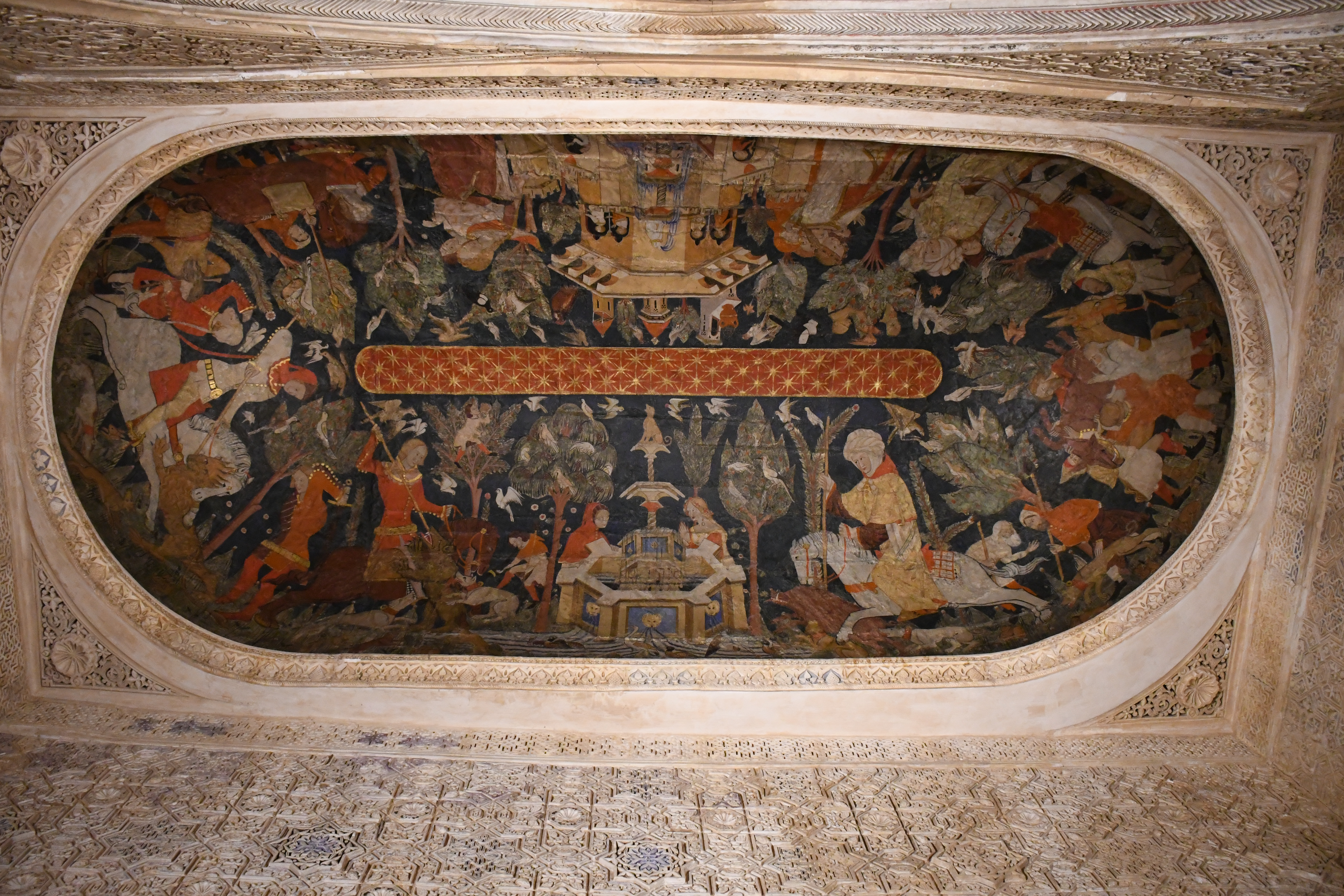
The northern painted vault, with scenes of court life and sports

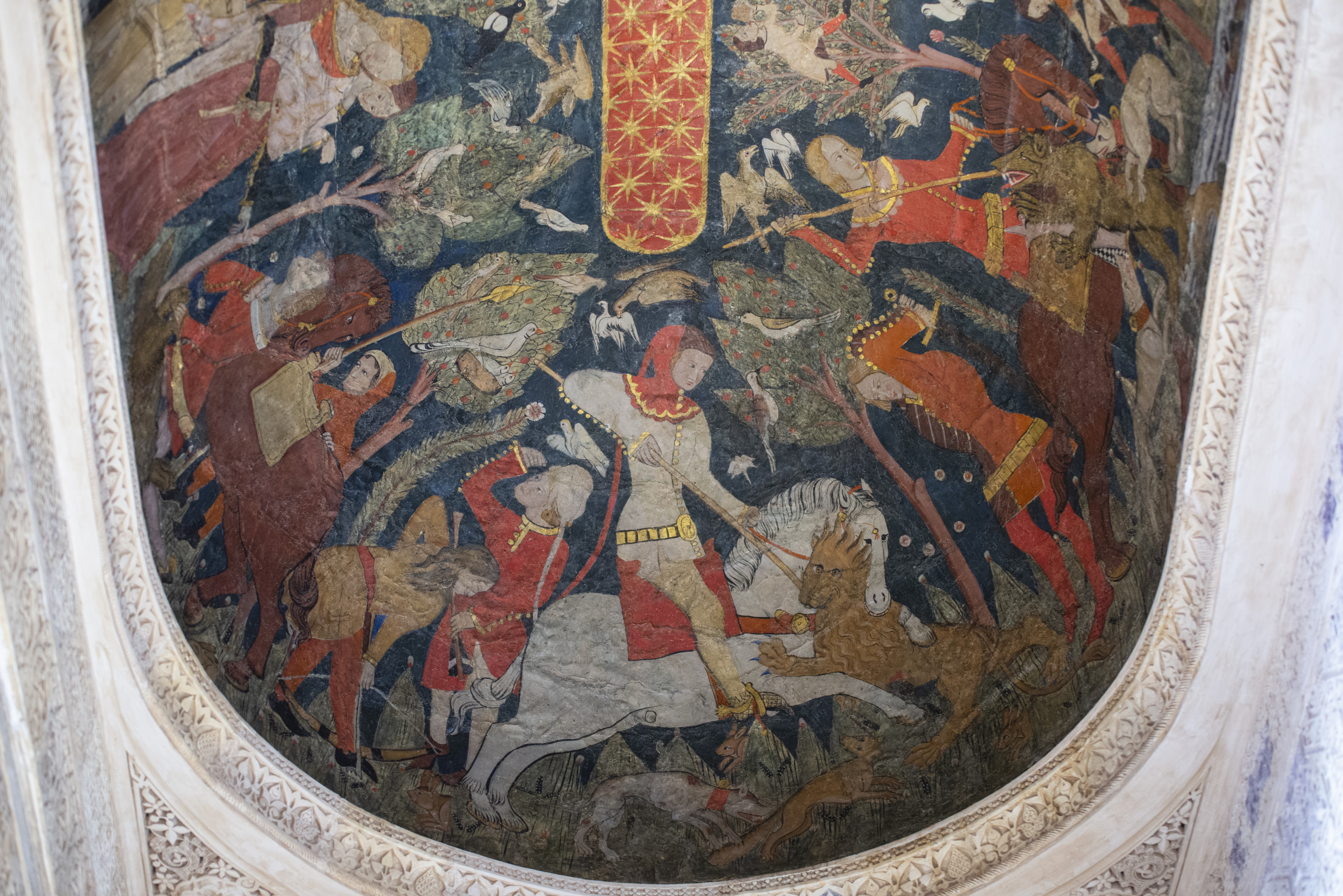
Detail of the northern painted vault

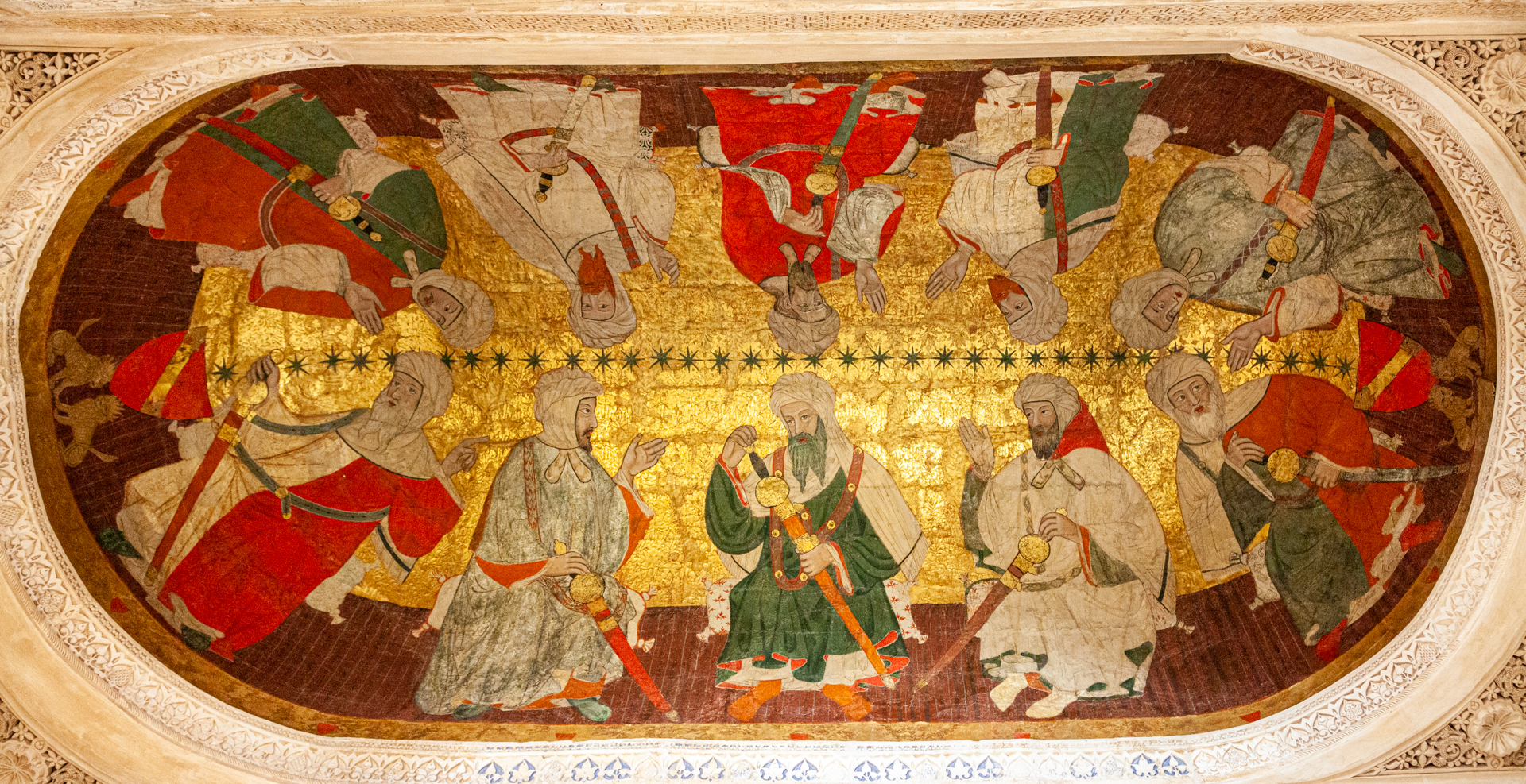
The middle painted vault, with depictions of Nasrid figures

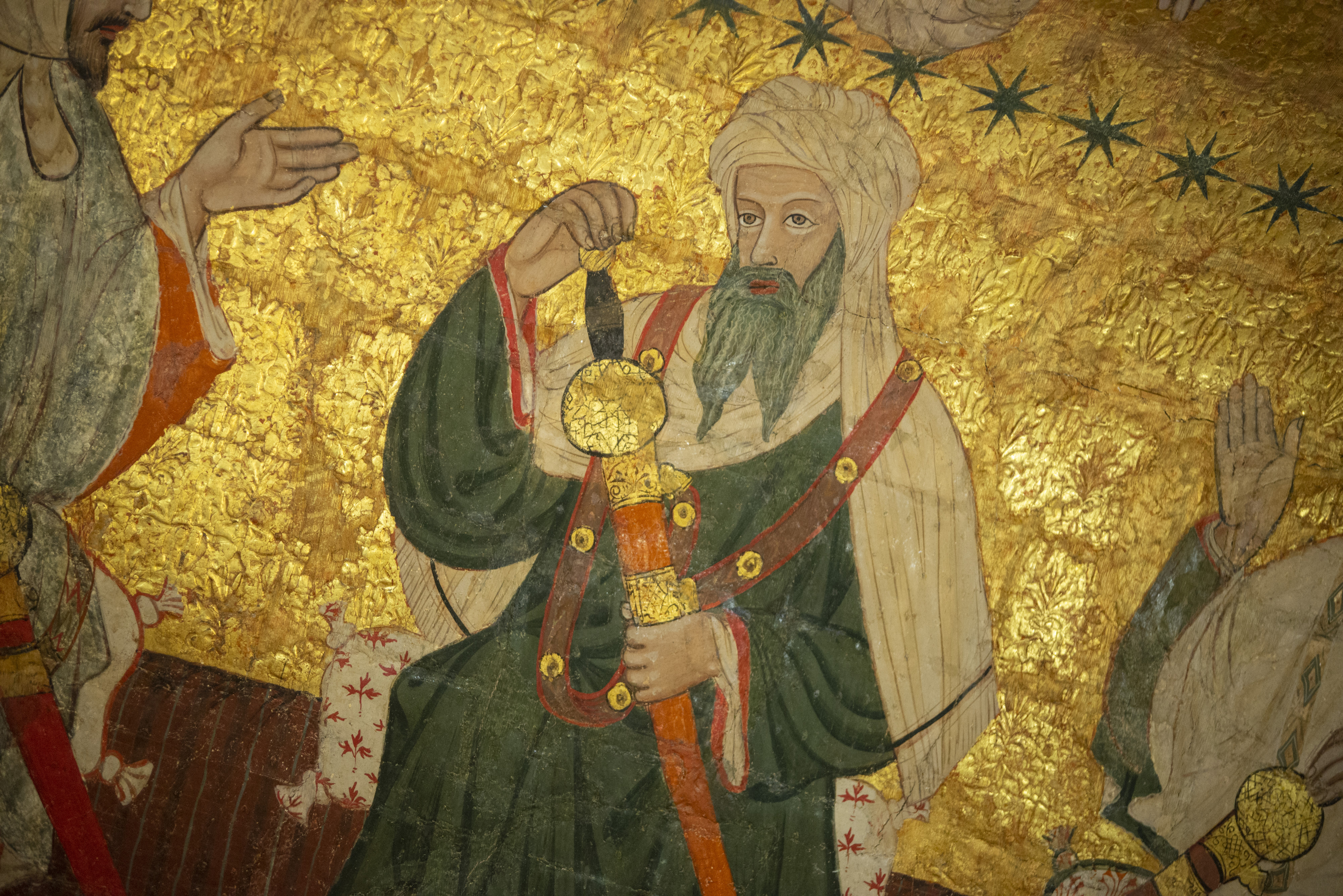
Detail of the middle painted vault

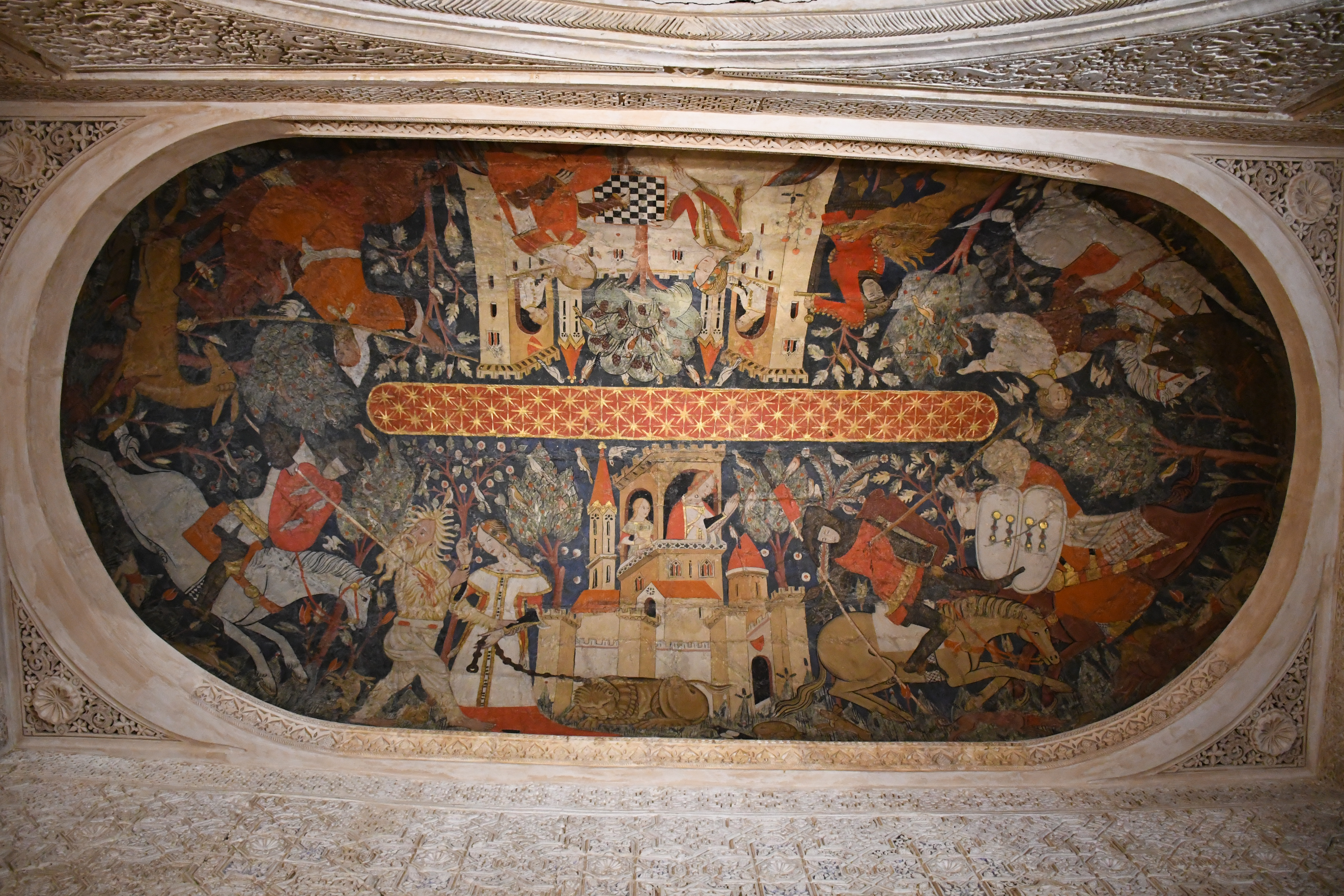
The southern painted vault, with scenes of court life and sports

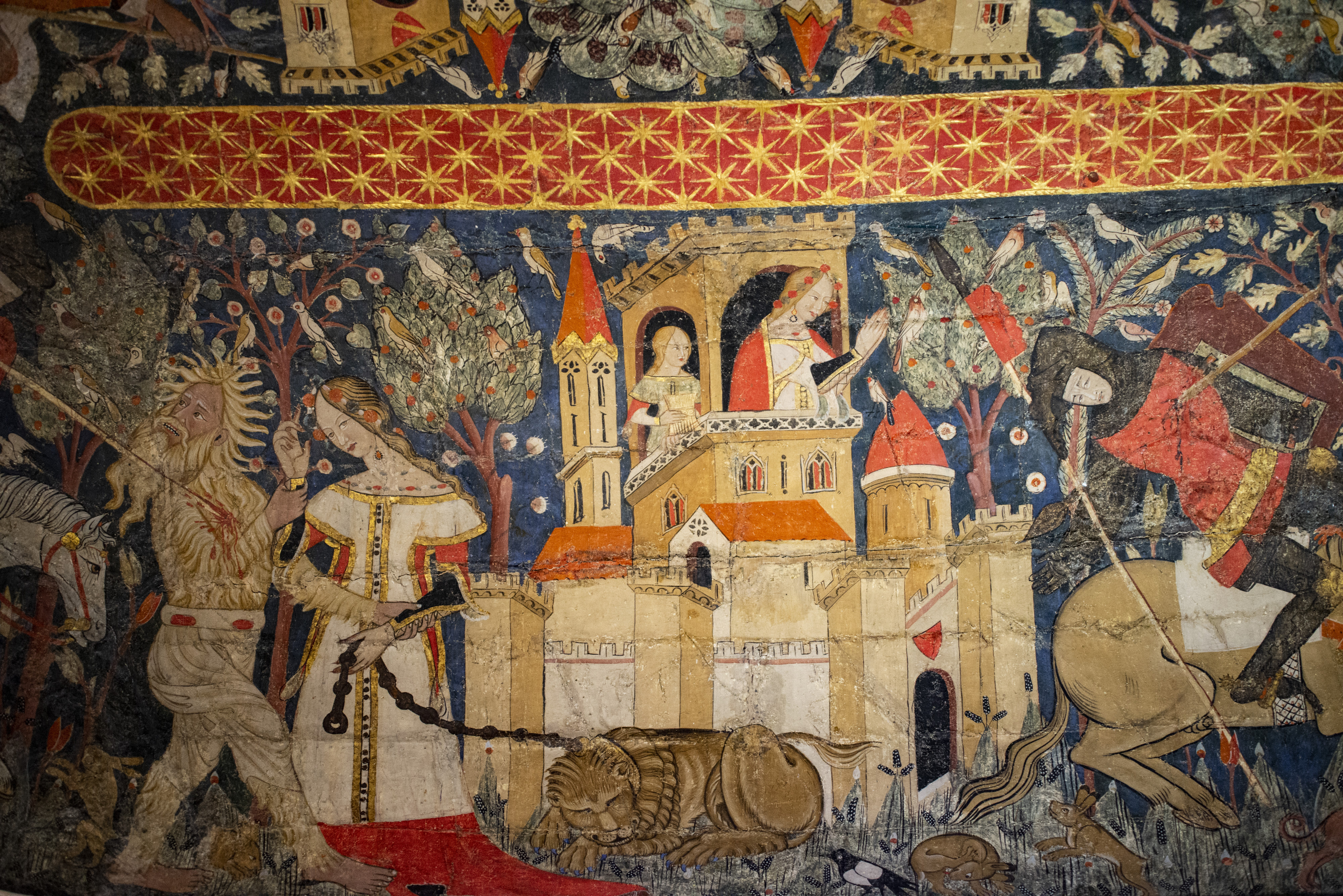
Detail of the southern painted vault

=== The Sala de Dos Hermanas ===
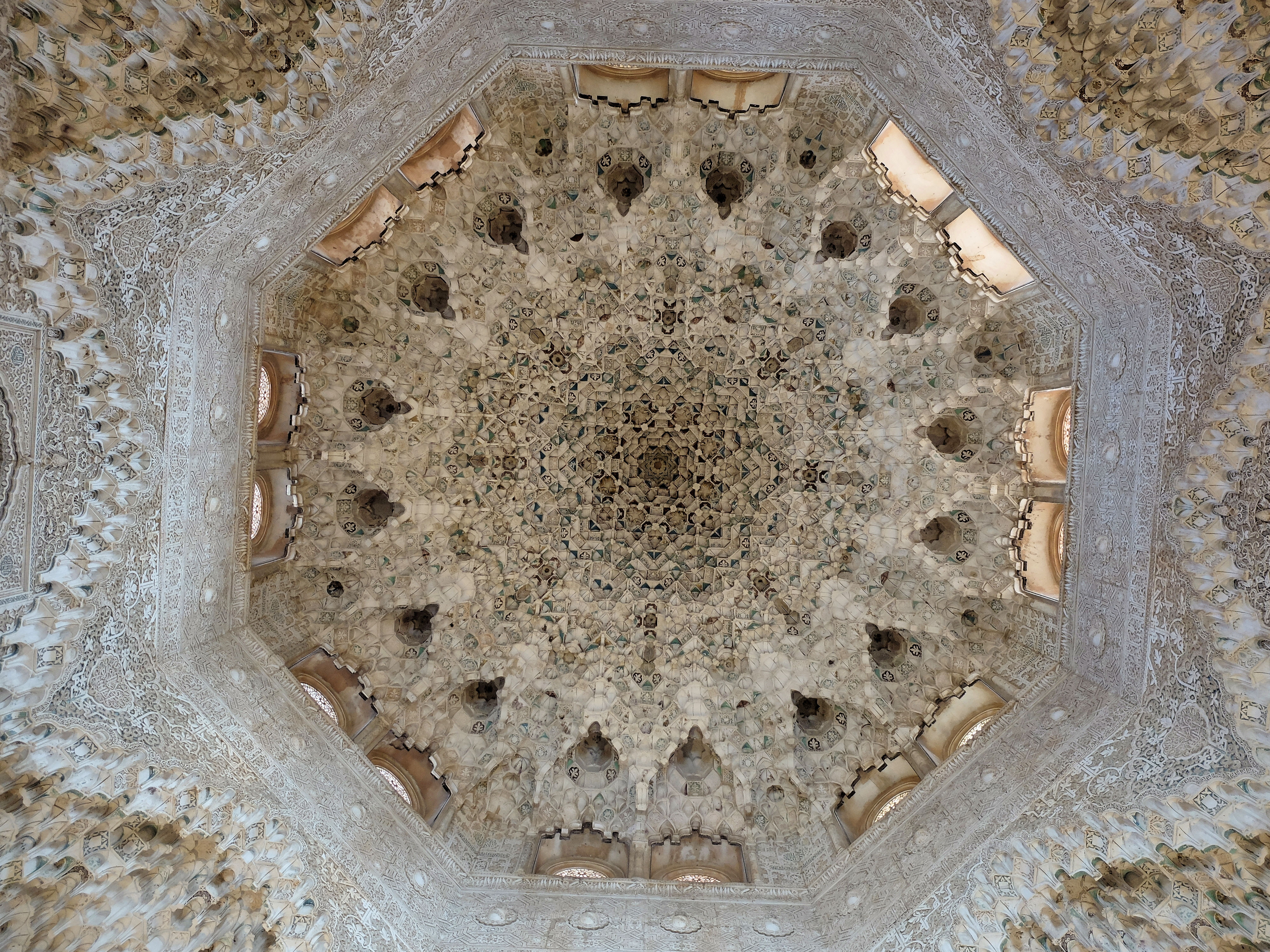
Muqarnas dome of the Sala de Dos Hermanas

The hall on the northern side of the courtyard is known as the Sala de Dos Hermanas or "Hall of the Two Sisters", so-called because of two large slabs of marble that form part of the pavement. Its original Arabic name was al-Qubba al-Kubrā ("the Great Dome"), suggesting it had a particular significance. Like the southern Sala de los Abencerrajes across from it, it consists of a large square space covered by an elaborate muqarnas dome, with two small side chambers on either side. The muqarnas dome is set within an eight-sided cupola pierced with two windows on each side. The dome has a diameter of 8 meters, making it the second-largest dome in the Alhambra. The transitional zones between the octagonal cupola and the square chamber are occupied by muqarnas sculpting, much like in the Sala de los Abencerrajes. The dome is considered of the most magnificent muqarnas domes in Islamic art. The muqarnas composition, which consists of at least 5000 prismatic pieces, unfolds from the central summit into sixteen miniature domes right above the level of the windows. The upper walls of the hall are also covered in intricate stucco decoration, while the lower walls have preserved their original zellij tile decoration. Right above the tile decoration is an inscription band containing a 24-line poem by Ibn Zamrak which praises the hall's dome and makes reference to the Pleiades.

Even more so than the southern hall, this northern hall appears to have designed as its own independent residence. The side chambers on either side of the hall are accessed through single doorways and these chambers have their own smaller niche-like side chambers on their north side. An upper floor exists and wraps around the central hall, with a single arched window on each side of the hall providing a view from this floor to the hall below. As with the Sala de los Abencerrajes, an upper floor room above the entrance corridor also has windows overlooking the courtyard. The large wooden doors at the entrance of the hall are masterpieces of Nasrid-era carpentry. They were removed from their original location and are currently housed and displayed at the Alhambra Museum. Right behind the doorway is a small passage on the left leading to latrines and a small passage on the right leading to a staircase to the upper floor.

Details of the Sala de Dos Hermanas

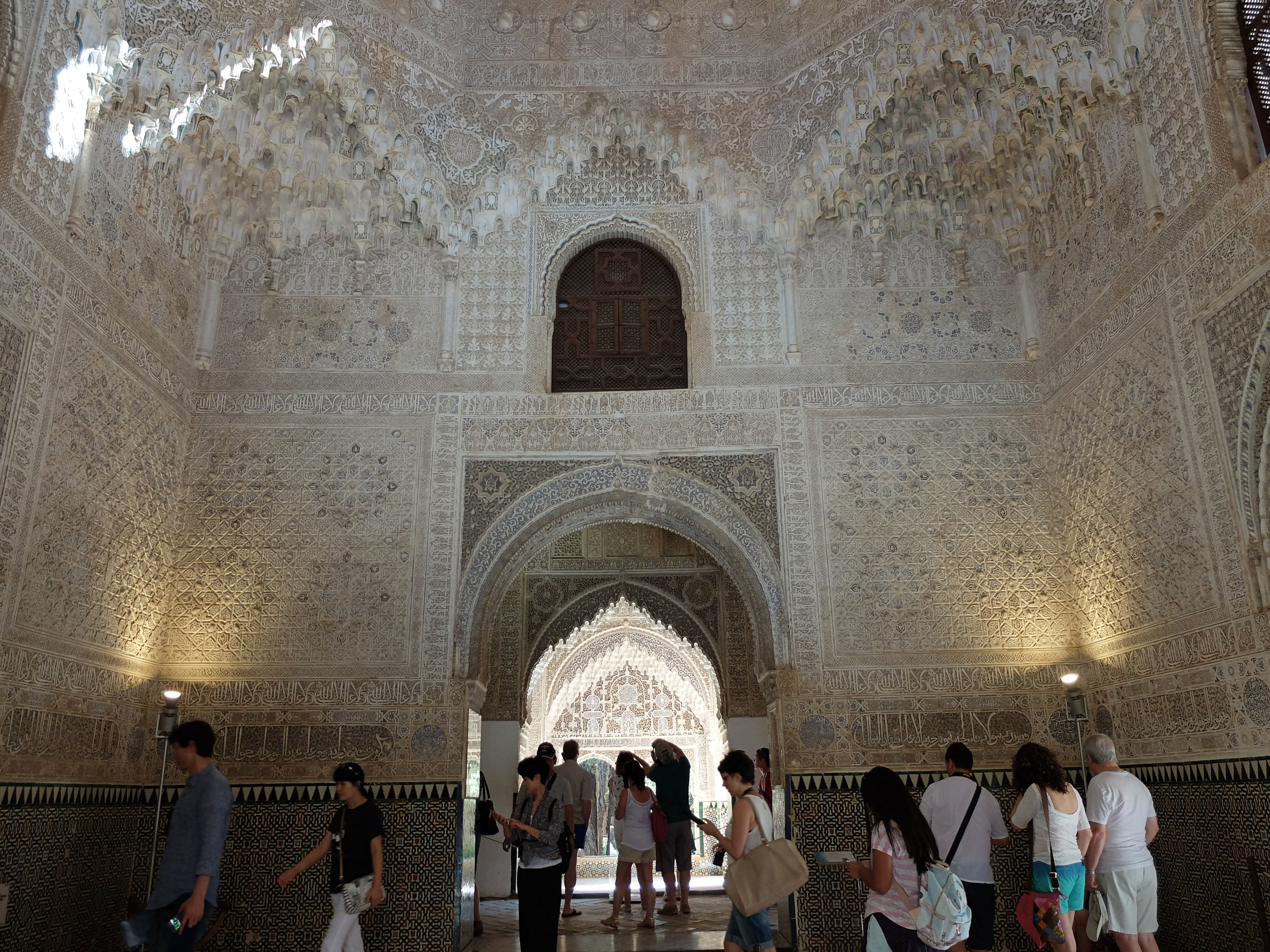
The Sala de Dos Hermanas (looking north towards the mirador)

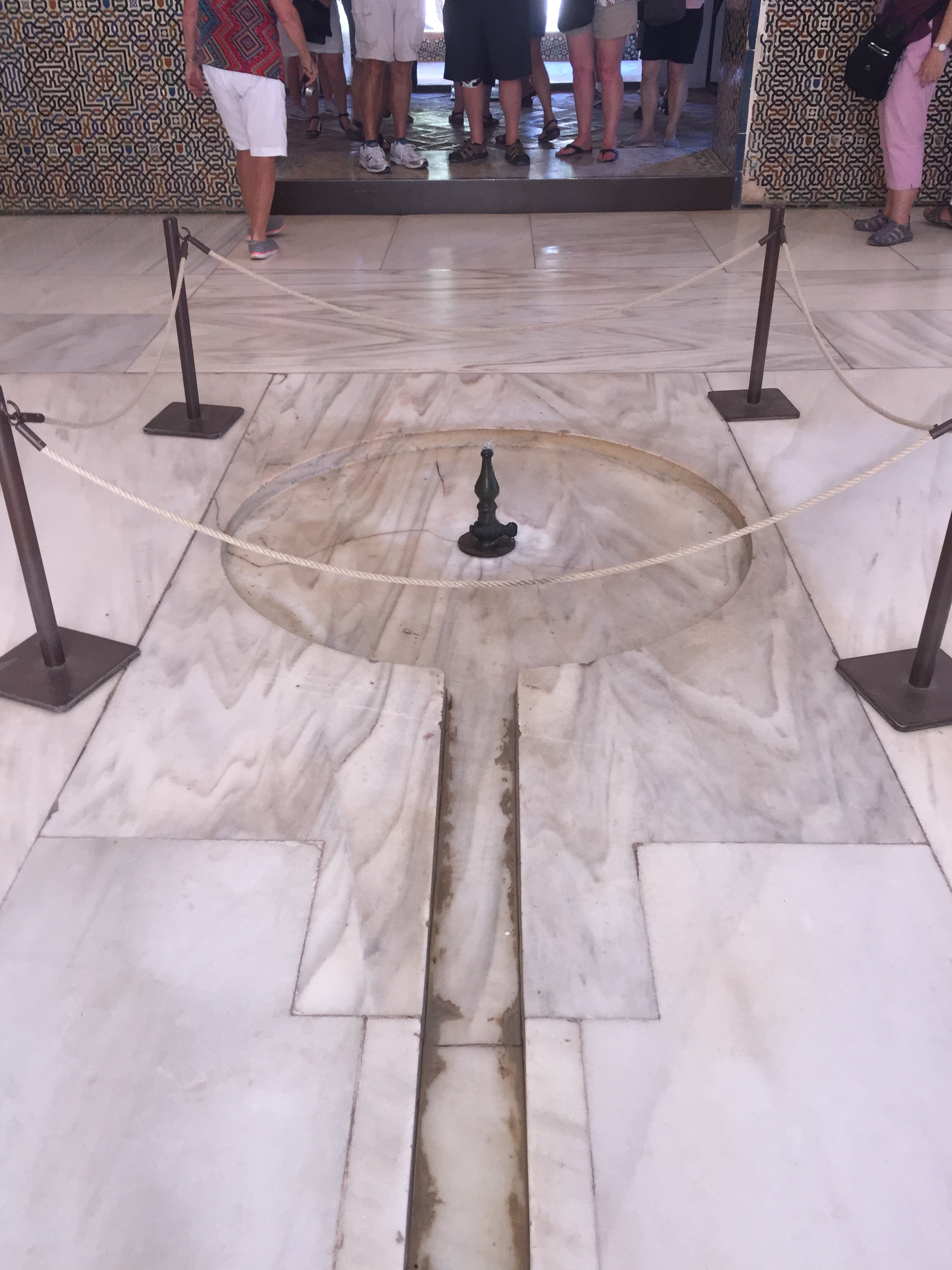
Fountain at the center of the room, with canal leading towards the courtyard

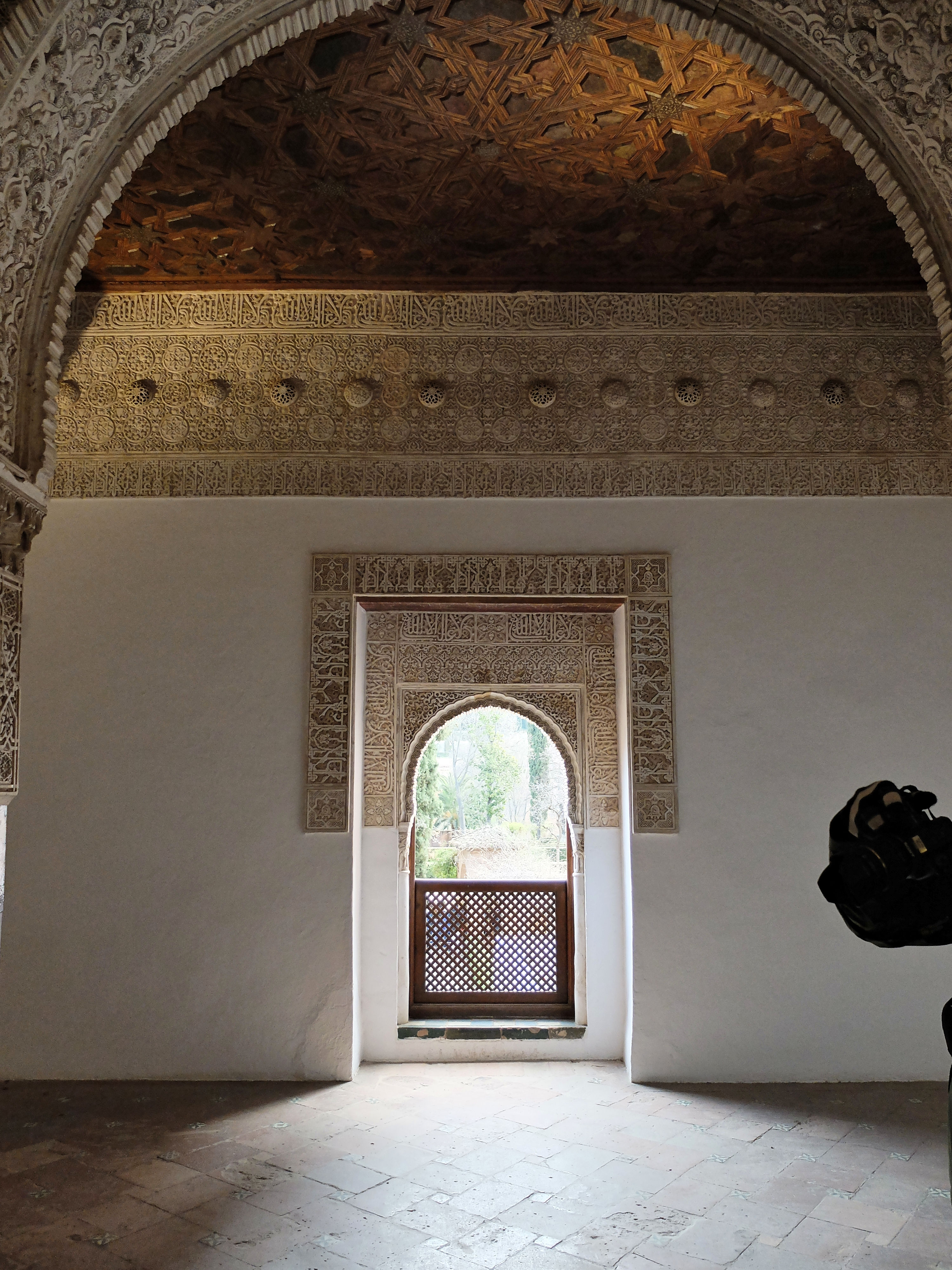
One of the side chambers in the Sala de Dos Hermanas

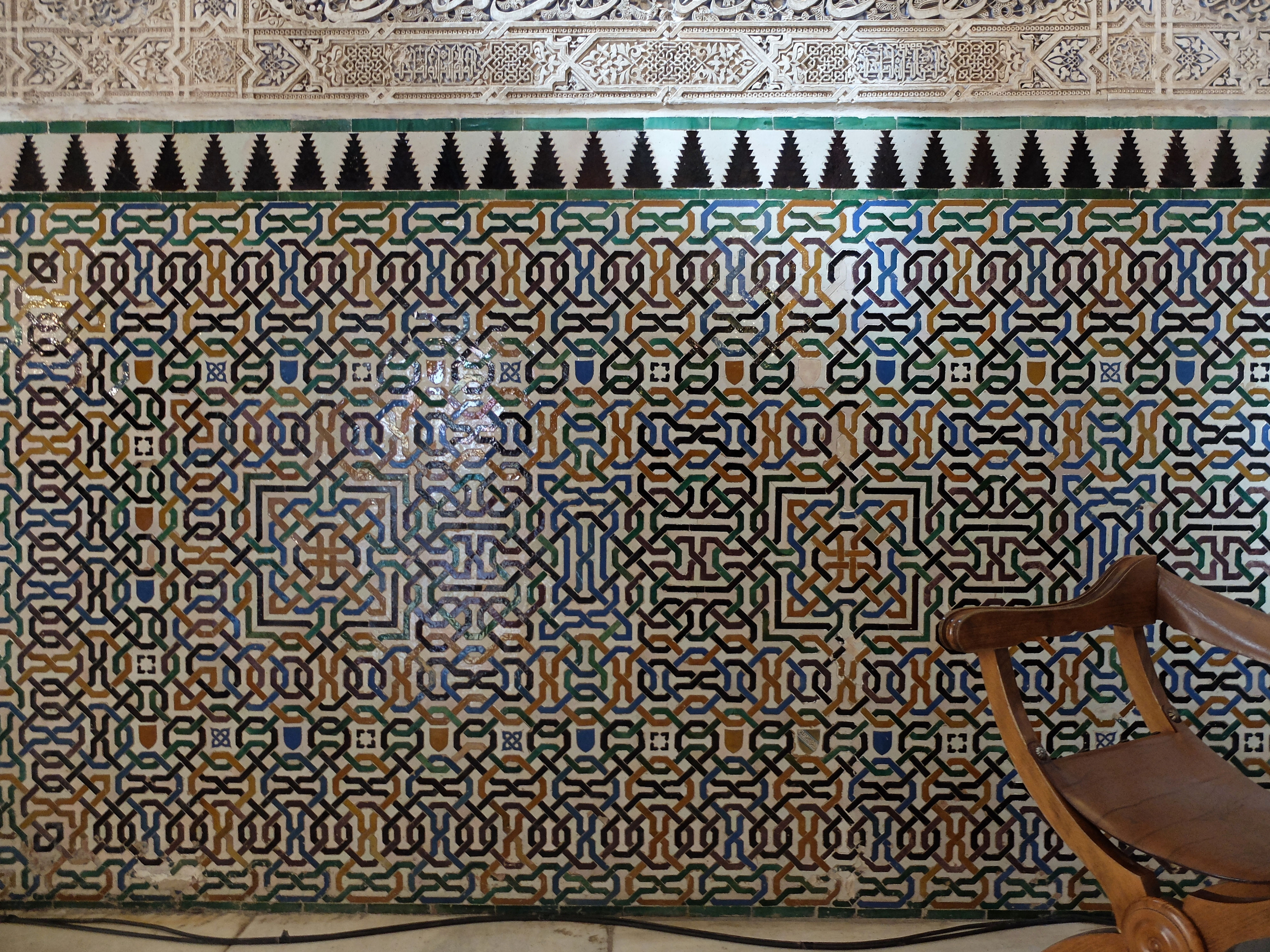
Zellij tiles on the lower walls

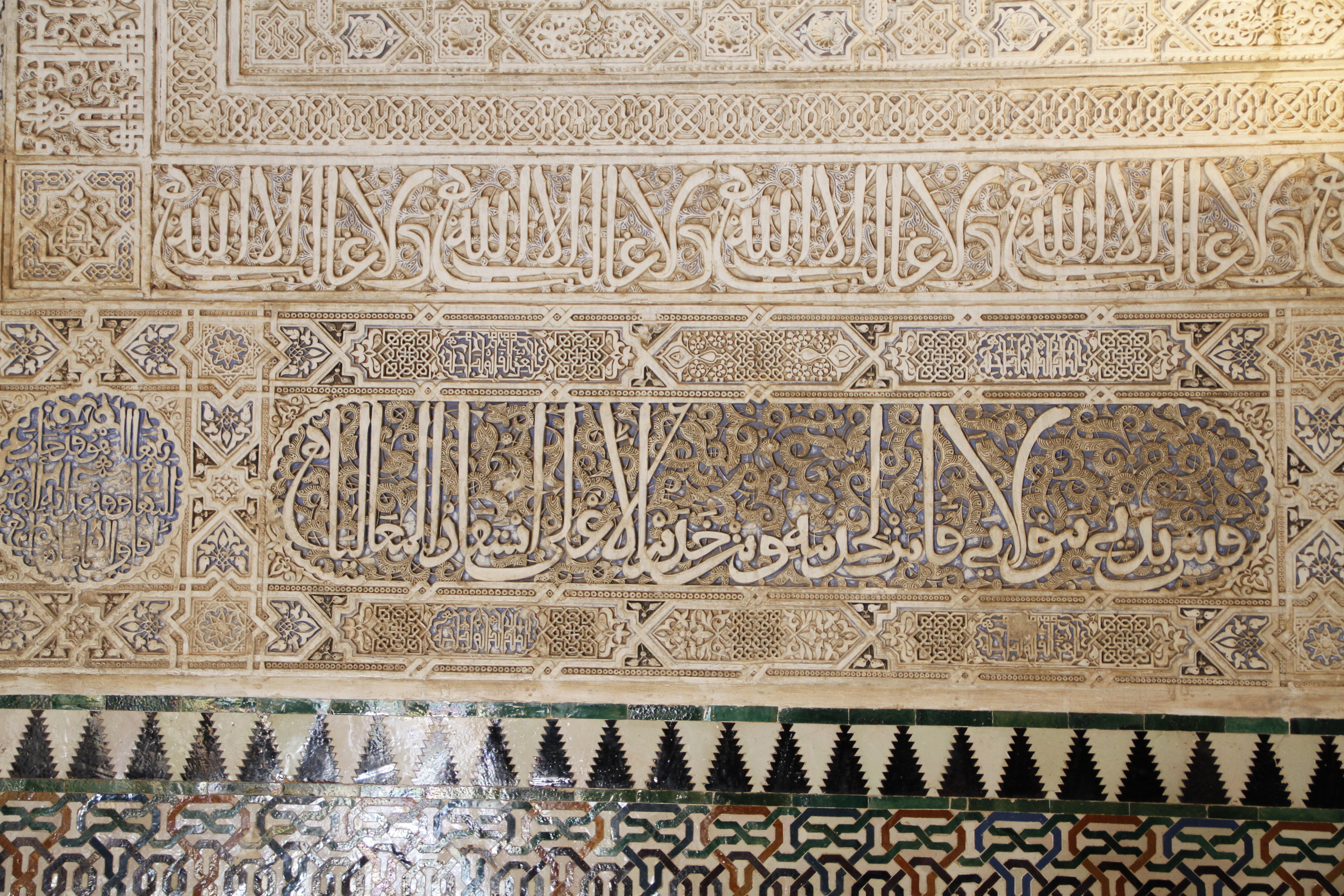
Stucco decoration and Arabic inscription along the walls

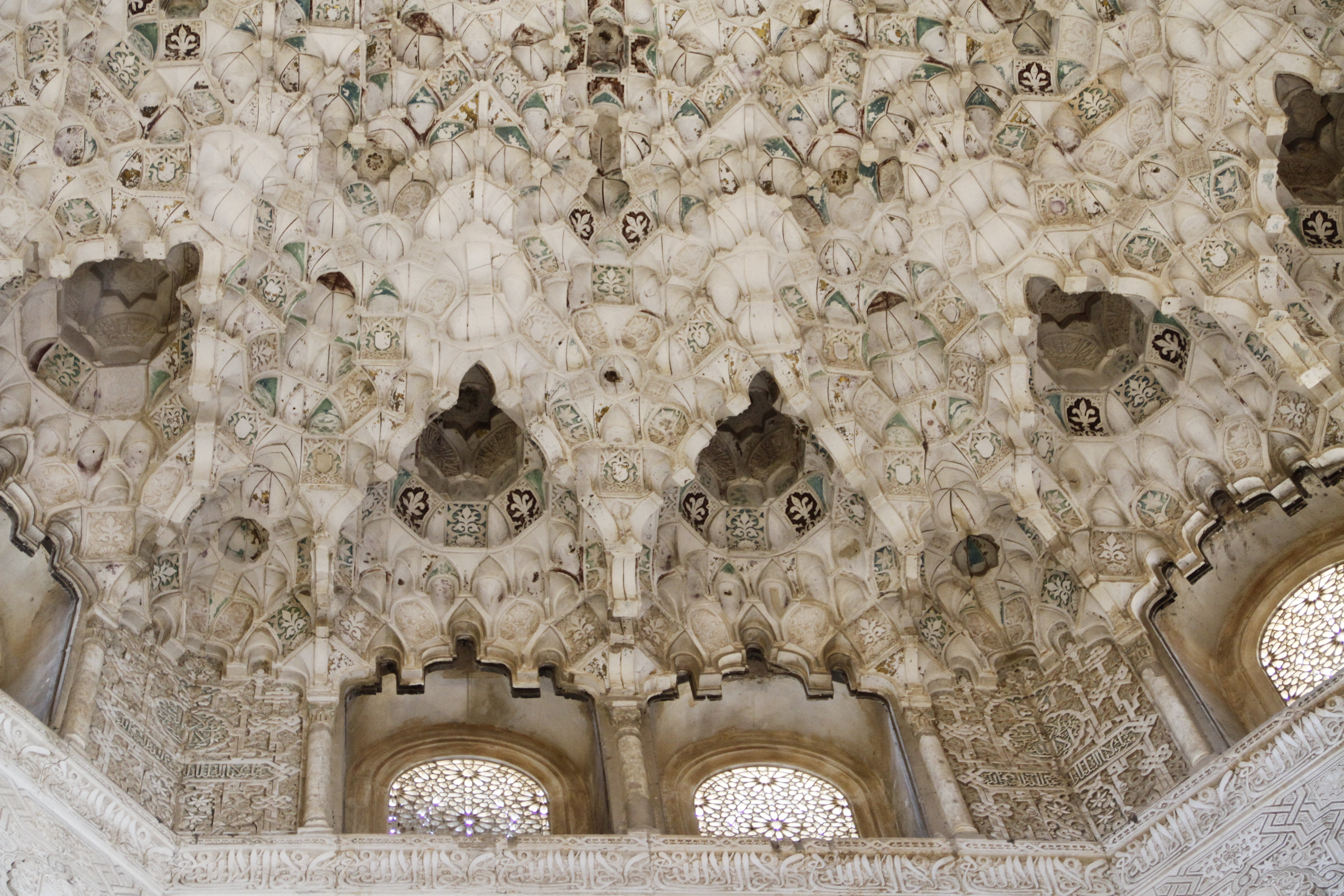
Detail of the muqarnas vault, showing the miniature domes above the window level

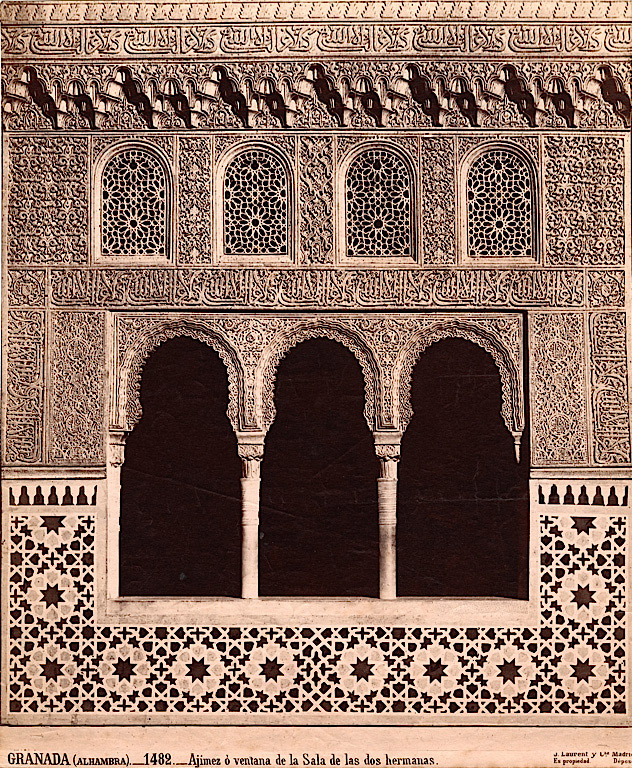
Interior decoration around the windows in the upper-floor room overlooking the Court of the Lions (1874 photo)

==== Mirador de Lindaraja ====
On the northern side of the Sala de Dos Hermanas is an arched doorway leading to a wide rectangular chamber known as the Sala de los Ajimeces ("Hall of the Mullioned Windows"). This chamber is covered by a long rectangular muqarnas vault ceiling which is composed of multiple consecutive muqarnas domes blending into one another. On the north side of this hall is a small projecting room with double-arched windows on three sides which overlook the gardens below. This lookout chamber is known as the Mirador de Lindaraja. The Spanish word mirador denotes a belvedere or lookout, while the name Lindaraja is a corruption of Arabic 'Ayn Dar 'Aisha (Arabic: عين دار عائشة, lit. 'Eye of the House of 'Aisha'). This small chamber has some of the most sophisticated stucco-carved decoration in the Alhambra, featuring arabesque, geometric, and epigraphic motifs with blind muqarnas arches framing the windows. The lower walls also have original mosaic tilework forming very fine Arabic inscriptions. One of the inscriptions around the window refers to the ruler's throne as the "caliphal throne" and describes the ruler (Muhammad V) as the "pupil" of the garden (referring either the garden below or to the adjoining hall). The mirador room is covered by a unique lantern vault ceiling consisting of a wooden lattice structure shaped into an interlacing geometric motif and filled with pieces of coloured glass. This ceiling is the only one of its kind in the Alhambra, but historical Arabic sources describe the existence of an even larger glass ceiling that was once present in the Mexuar palace.

Mirador de Lindaraja and the Sala de los Ajimeces

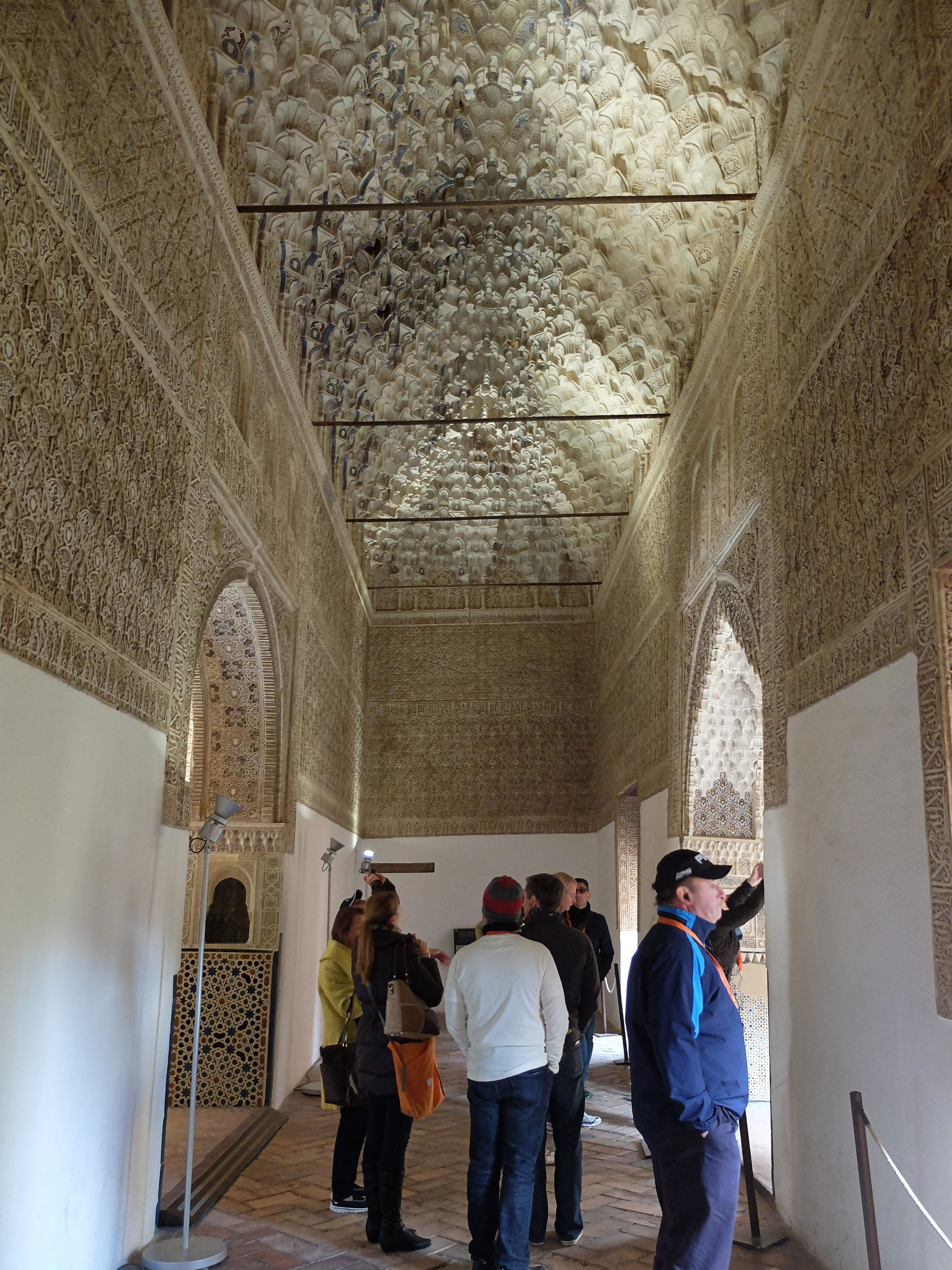
The Sala de los Ajimeces, between the Sala de Dos Hermanas (left) and the Mirador (right)

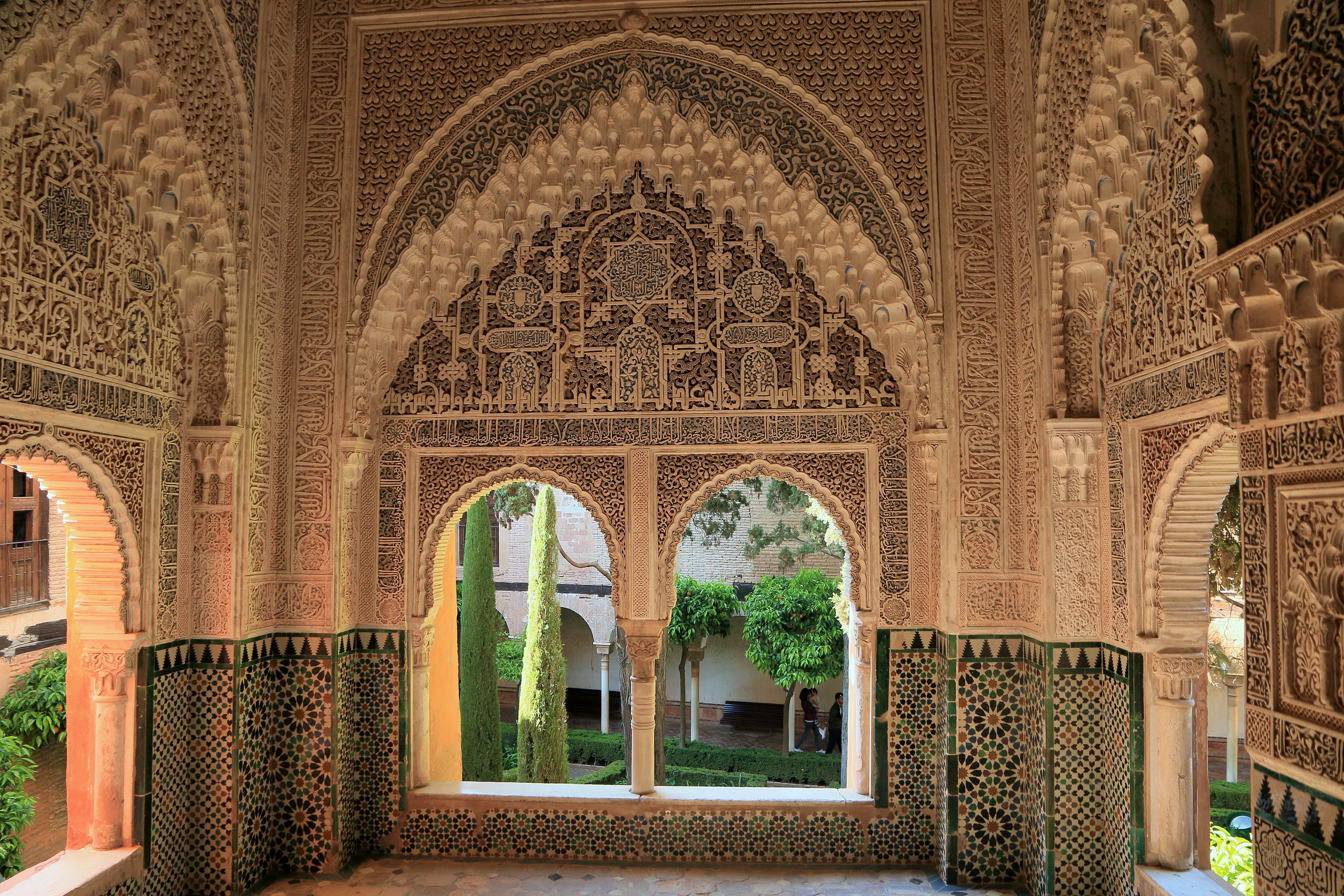
The Mirador of Lindaraja

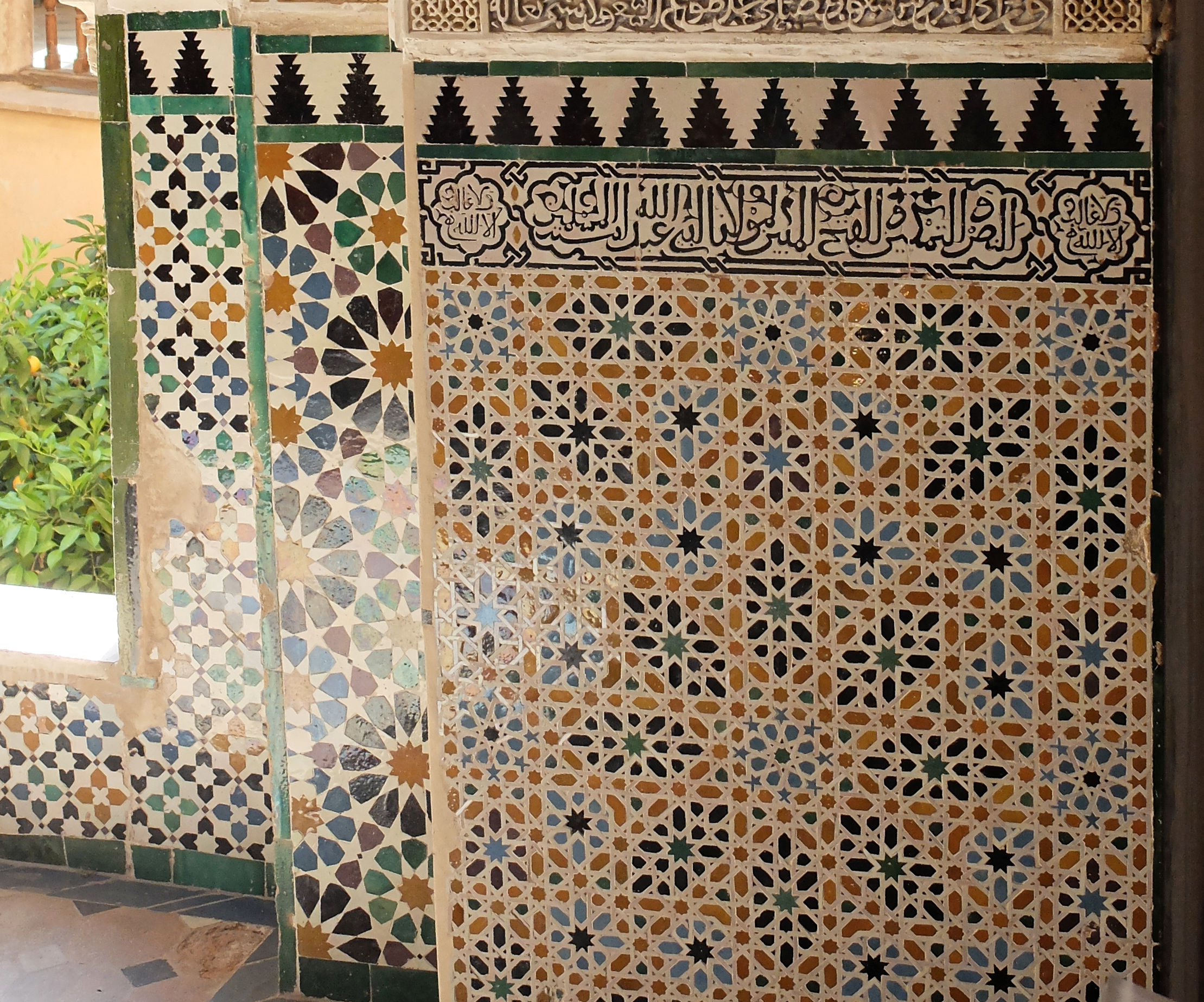
Mosaic tile decoration in the Mirador of Lindaraja

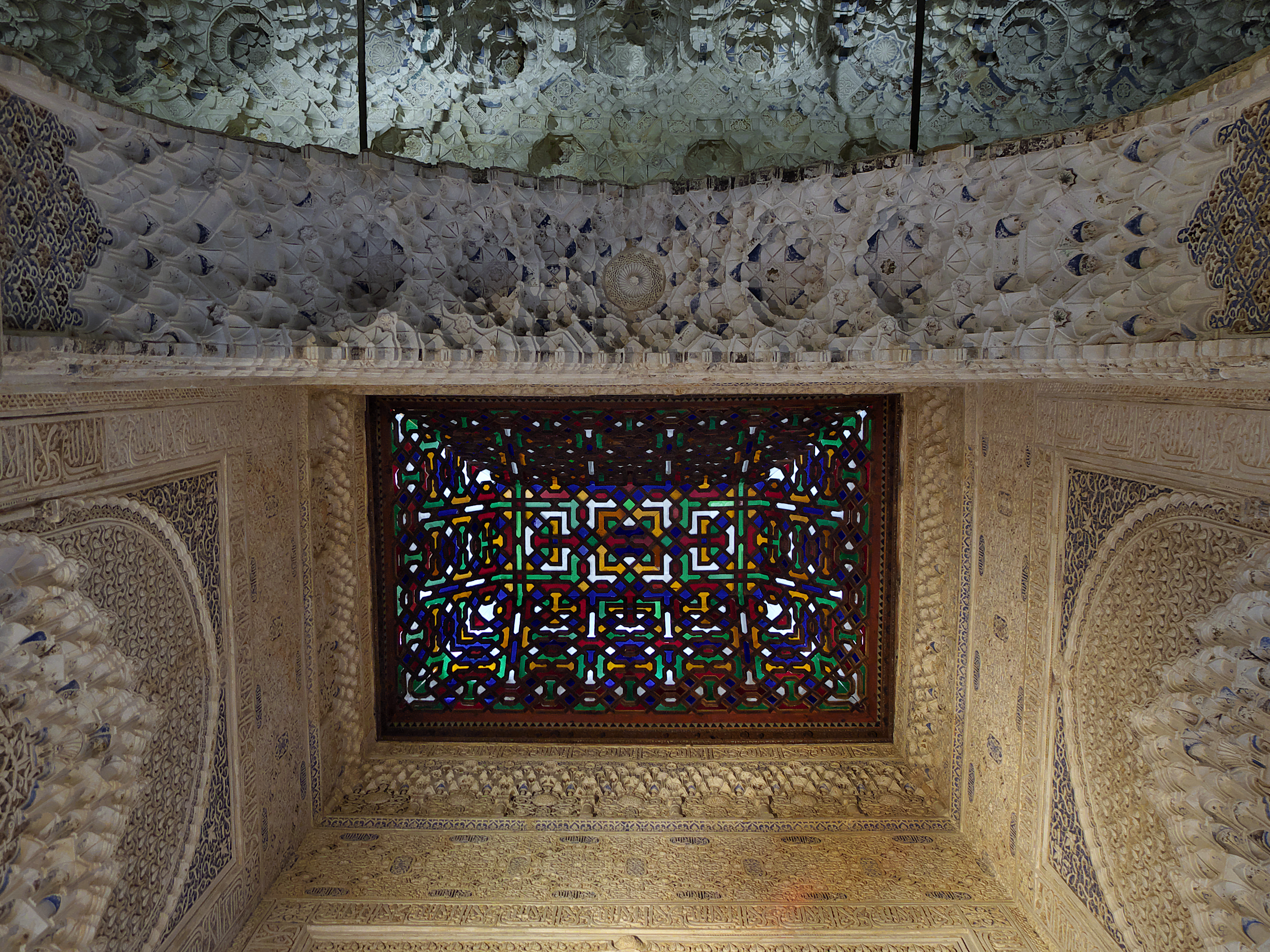
Ceiling of the Mirador of Lindaraja, with the wooden vault filled with coloured glass

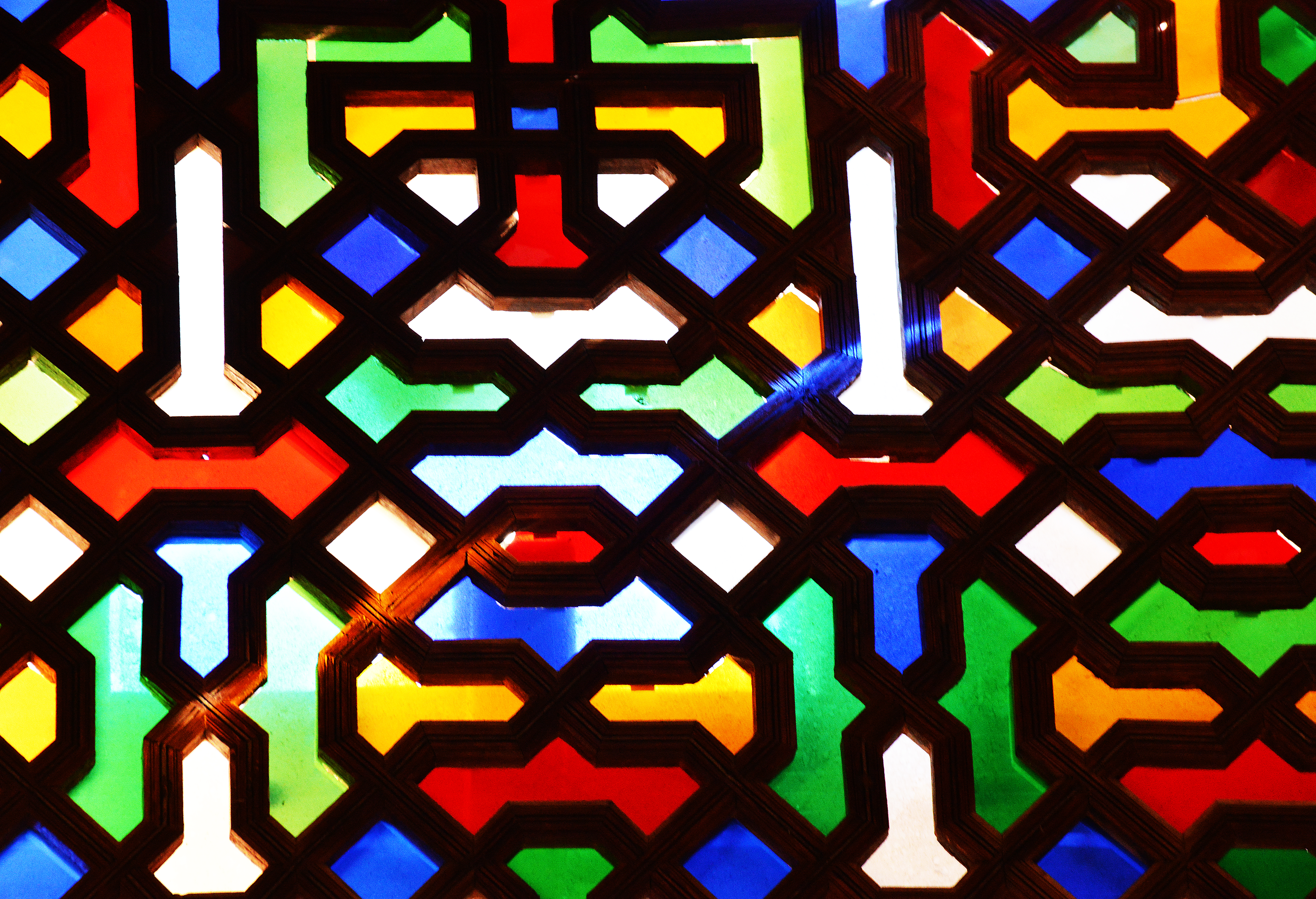
Detail of the wooden vault with coloured glass in the Mirador

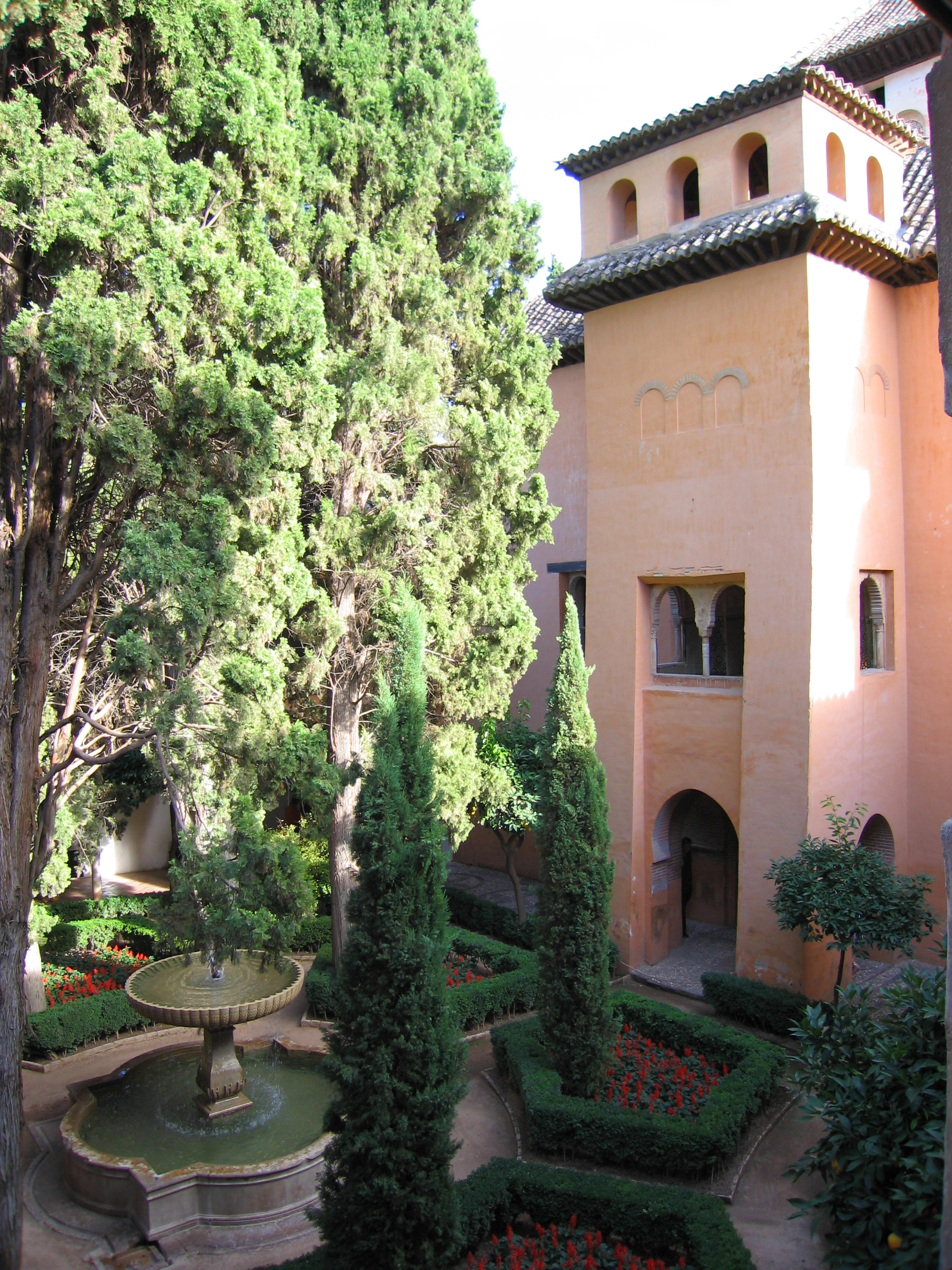
Exterior of the Mirador de Lindaraja (right), seen from the Patio of Lindaraja

== Fountain of the Lions ==
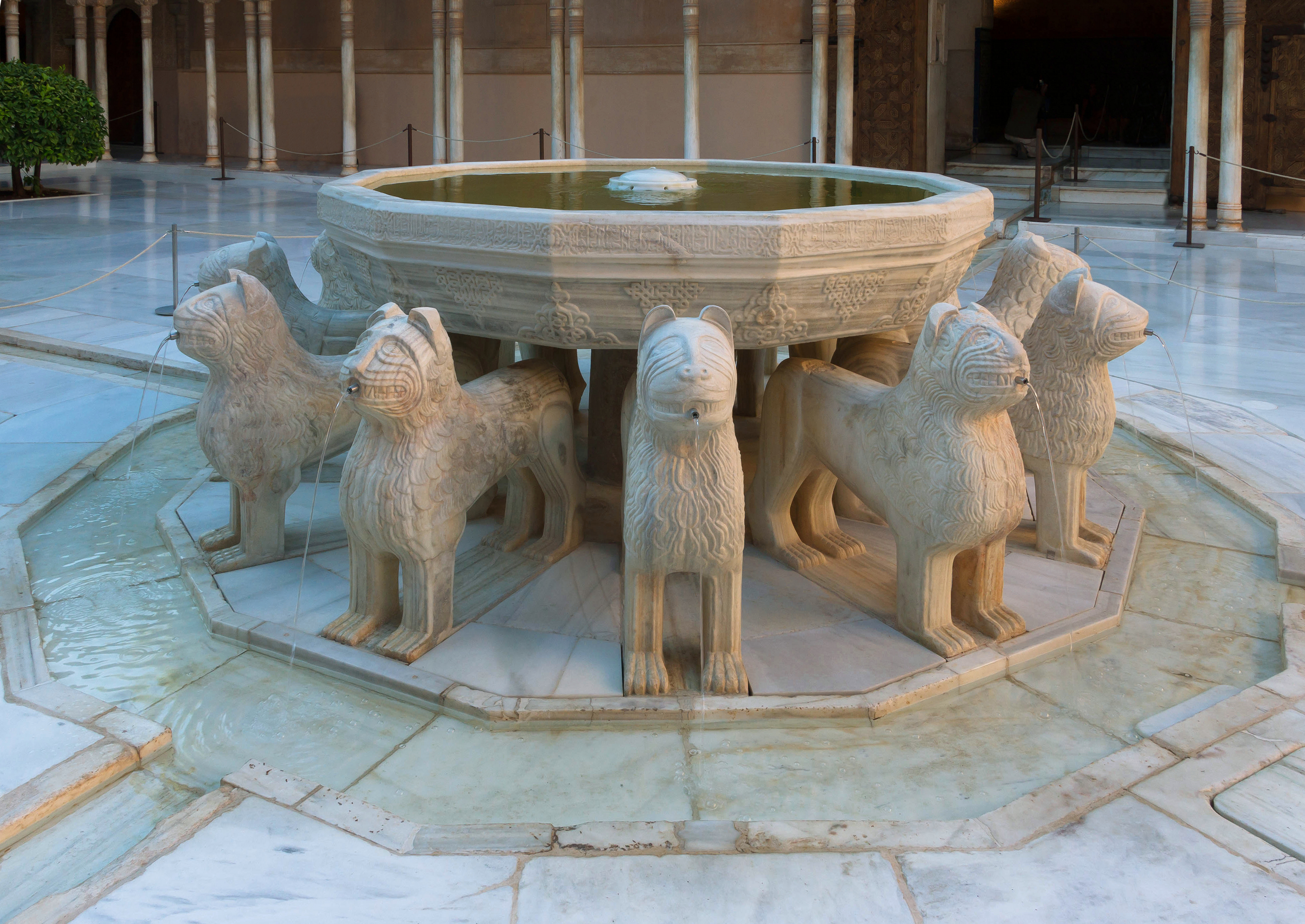
The Fountain of the Lions in 2012 (after restoration)

The central fountain of the courtyard, which has been modified and restored several times over the centuries, consists of a bowl-like marble basin surrounded by twelve lions. The lions face outwards and appear as if supporting the basin on their backs. All these components are made of Macael marble from Almeria. The existence of fountains with lion sculptures is documented at other sites of al-Andalus such as the earlier Medina Azahara near Cordoba. Other zoomorphic sculptures from al-Andalus are also attested, such as the larger example of the Pisa Griffin.

The marble water basin was carved from a single piece of marble. While it appears completely white today, it was originally painted with subtle colors in order to highlight its carved decoration, but these colors have been lost due to repetitive cleaning over the centuries. This decoration includes a long inscription around the border of the bowl featuring a poem by Ibn Zamrak. The original hydraulic system was designed to keep a consistent water level in the basin.

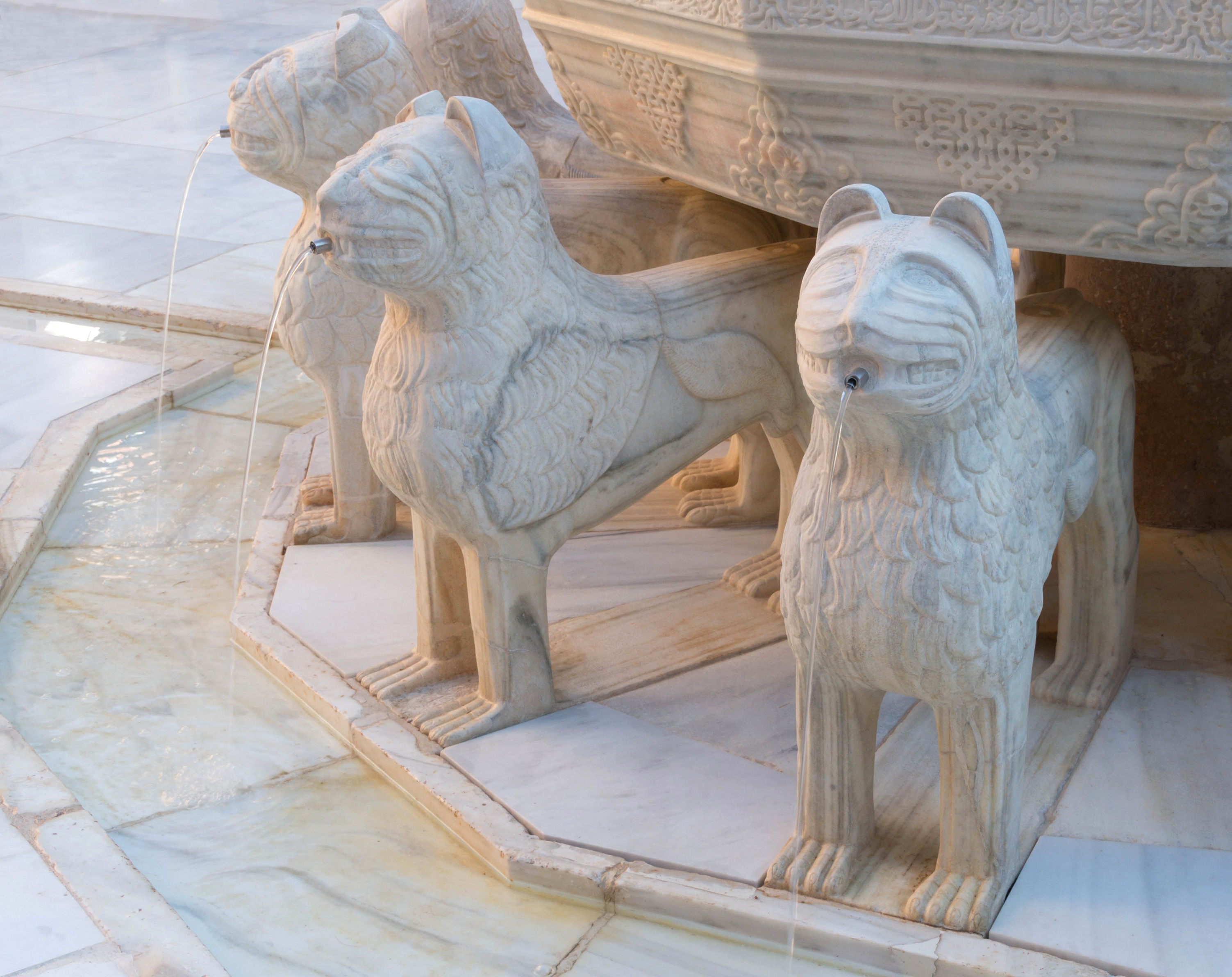
Detail of the lion sculptures

=== Origins ===
The origin of the sculpted fountain and its lions has been debated. A theory by Frederick Bargebuhr in 1956 suggests that the lion sculptures came from the 11th-century palace of the Jewish vizier Yusuf ibn Nagrela (d. 1066). Bargebuhr even suggested that the Palace of the Lions was built on the foundations of this earlier palace. Oleg Grabar later supported this origin story for the fountain. The proposal was based on the description of a fountain found in a poem by Ibn Gabirol in the 11th century which described the vizier's palace. Under this interpretation, the lions represented the Twelve Tribes of Israel, and two of them have a triangle on the forehead, indicating the two extant tribes Judá and Leví. However, this origin theory has since been challenged or refuted by many other scholars, mostly on the arguments that a poetic description is not direct evidence of the two fountains being the same, that the description in the poem itself is not an exact match, and that the style of the lions belongs to 14th-century Nasrid art.

=== Modifications and restorations ===
In the second half of the 16th century, after the Alhambra had become a Spanish palace, the fountain was significantly modified by the addition of smaller water basins above the central spout in order to create a multi-level fountain. In 1624 sculptor Alonso de Mena repaired the fountain and cleaned it. In the early 19th century a set of spouts was added to the fountain and in 1837 another spout was added at the top of the fountain to reflect the tastes of the time. The original (lower) main basin was also raised in height in 1884.

In the 20th century efforts were made to return the fountain to its original state. Several tests and studies began in 1945 and in 1966 it was generally restored to its hypothesized original appearance, removing the pieces that were added to it from the 16th century onward. In 2002 another major restoration process was begun by the Patronato de la Alhambra. One of the 12 lion sculptures was removed that year, followed by the rest in 2007, in order to undergo restoration in the Patronato's workshops. Harmful residues and particles were removed and cracks were repaired. The water basin, due to its size, remained on site and was restored in situ. After being exhibited at the Alhambra Museum for 2 years, the lions were put back in place in December 2011.

The hydraulic system of the fountain was also studied during the recent restoration process. In 1884, when the fountain's main basin was raised, a cylindrical marble bloc was discovered whose top was pierced by many holes. In 1890, archeologist Francisco de Paula Valladar hypothesized that this piece was the means by which water originally spilled into the fountain's main basin. Based on the description provided by Ibn Zamrak's poem inscribed on the basin, he theorized that the holes were connected to a system of pipes that allowed water to flow both in and out of the basin at the same time. This system maintained a steady water level in the basin and prevented the surface of the water from being disturbed, as suggested by Ibn Zamrak's poem, which evokes the "solid" appearance of the water. During the restoration work of the 1960s, experts were not yet able to implement this hydraulic system; therefore, the fountain was left with a small water jet spouting water in the middle of the basin. In 1981 the original marble cylinder piece was removed for preservation and further study at the Alhambra Museum. In 2012, upon completing the restoration of the fountain, a replica of this cylindrical piece was installed in the fountain to replace the water jet, thus restoring the hydraulic system to its hypothesized original state.

The restoration choices that the Patronato has made over the years in regards to the fountain have been met with criticism or skepticism from some scholars. Bernhard Schirg, for example, has criticized the use of Ibn Zamrak's poem as a documentary reference to reconstitute the fountain's hydraulic system. Schirg argues that poems like those composed by Ibn Zamrak, as well as descriptions made by other historical writers, often blended direct description with metaphor and fantasy, and thus should not be taken at face value.

=== Excerpt of Ibn Zamrak's poem on the basin ===
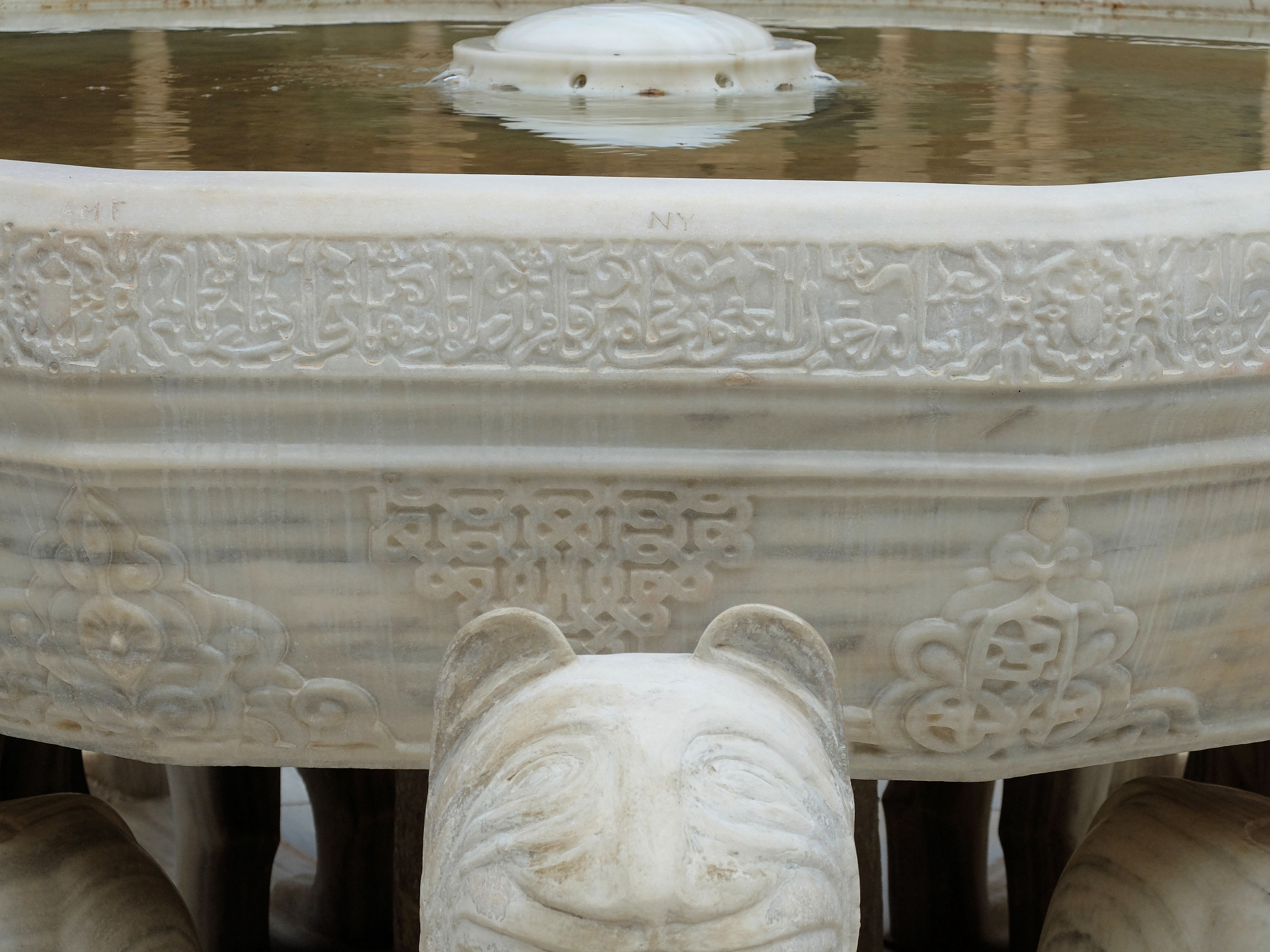
Part of the inscription running around the rim of the marble basin

Carved around the rim of the basin is a poem of twelve verses by the vizier and poet Ibn Zamrak. Six of the verses originate, with minor modifications, from a longer qasida of 146 verses that Ibn Zamrak composed for the banquet honoring the circumcision of Muhammad V's son, Abd Allah. Verses from the same qasida are also included in the Hall of the Two Sisters. The first part of the poem refers specifically to the fountain and alludes to how its hydraulic system functioned. Below is an excerpt (verses 3 to 7):

وَمَنْحُوتَة مِنْ لُؤْلُؤٍ شَفَّ نُورُهَا تُحَلِّي بِمُرْفَضِّ الجُمَانِ النَّوَاحِيَا
بِذَوْبِ لُجَيْنِ سَالَ بَيْنَ جَوَاهِرٍ غَدَا مِثلَهَا في الحُسْنِ أبْيَضَ صَافِيَا
تَشَابُهُ جَارٍ لِلْعُيُونِ بِجَامِدٍ فَلَمْ نَدْرِ أَيَّاً مِنْهُمَا كَانَ جَارِيَا
أَلَمْ تَرَ أَنَّ المَاءَ يَجْري بِصَفْحِهَا وَلَكِنَّهَا سَدَّتْ عَلَيْهِ المَجَارِيَا
كَمِثْلِ مُحِبٍّ فَاضَ بِالدَّمْعِ جَفْنُهُ وَغَيَّضَ ذَاكَ الدَّمْعَ إِذْ خَافَ وَاشِيَا

Translation:

Sculpted of pearls, of limpid light
all bedecked by dewdrops spilled;
liquid silver flowing amongst jewels,
sharing their white, transparent beauty.
So similar is that which runs to that which is still
that we know not which of them is flowing.
Can't you see how the water runs through its bowl,
but the bowl itself stops its flow
just as a lover whose tears are on the brink
keeps them in for fear that they might betray him.

== Possible influences and symbolism ==
The overall form of the palace courtyard – an elongated rectangle with two halls facing each other at either end – is found in many earlier palaces in Al-Andalus, including other Nasrid palaces in the Alhambra (e.g. Comares Palace), and precedents for this type can be found as far back as the 10th century in Madinat al-Zahra (near Cordoba). The main innovation in the Palace of the Lions is the addition of two more halls facing each other across the courtyard's short axis and the accompanying extension of the columned portico to all four sides of the courtyard.

The presence of the four converging water channels in the floor of the courtyard is generally considered to be a symbolic representation of Paradise, which in both Muslim and Christian traditions is described as having four rivers. This arrangement may have drawn on the tradition of the Persian chahar bagh – a garden divided along its central axes into four symmetrical parts – while combining it with the classical peristyle tradition (a portico or arcade surrounding a courtyard). Gardens with a chahar bagh-type quadripartite division are also known in many earlier monuments in both Al-Andalus and the Maghreb (North Africa), where they are often known as a riad (or riyad). The star-like shape of the elaborate muqarnas dome in the Hall of the Abencerrajes (on the south side of the courtyard) may also symbolize the celestial heaven, as suggested by a poem by Ibn Zamrak that was originally inscribed on the walls. A similar comparison is made in the inscriptions of the northern Hall of the Two Sisters.

Some scholars have suggested that architecture of the same period in the Maghreb influenced the design of the Palace of the Lions. Juan Carlos Ruiz Souza, in proposing his theory about the palace being actually a madrasa, compares its layout and decoration to that of the madrasas and zawiyas built during the 14th century by the contemporary Marinid and Abd al-Wadid dynasties, whose courts were based in Fez (present-day Morocco) and Tlemcen (present-day Algeria), respectively. He notes the significant cultural and political relations that existed between the Nasrid, Marinid, and Abd al-Wadid courts. For example, Muhammad V spent his exile between 1359 and 1362 living in Fez under the protection of the Marinid court, while the Abd al-Wadid ruler Abu Hammu Musa II (r. 1353–1389), a close friend of Muhammad V, was born in Granada and lived there until the age of 29. Cynthia Robinson, in discussing Ruiz Souza's theory, agrees in general that madrasas and Sufi shrines in the Maghreb, such as those in Fez and Tlemcen, must have had an effect on the design of the Palace of the Lions. Robert Irwin also believes that the Palace of the Lions was influenced by, or related to, Marinid architecture, noting that Muhammad V built the palace after returning from his exile in Fez and that the decoration of the palace resembles that of Marinid madrasas in Morocco. Jonathan Bloom remarks that the design differences between the Palace of the Lions and earlier Nasrid palaces do not appear to be a "linear development" and that Muhammad V's time in Fez may be a factor in this evolution.

== See also ==
- Lambrequin arch
- Late medieval domes
