= List of light cruisers of Spain =

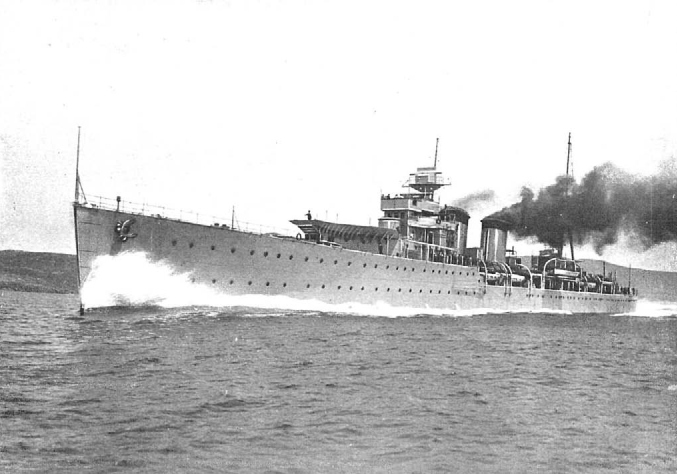
Admirante Cervera during a speed test in 1928

The list of light cruisers of Spain includes all light cruisers that have served in the Spanish Navy. Following its defeat in the Spanish-American War, the Spanish Navy fell into a period of decline. Due to a significant lag in industrial capabilities, Spain began designing and building its own warships by copying contemporary British light cruisers. These included the Reina Victoria Eugenia, which was modeled after the British Town-class cruisers and was nominally a scout cruiser but was actually much more powerful. It also included the Blas de Lezo class (a.k.a. Méndez Núñez class), which was a slightly upgraded copy of the British C-class light cruisers, and the Almirante Cervera class (a.k.a. Príncipe Alfonso class), which was based on the design of the British E-class light cruisers.

All these light cruisers were survived the Spanish Civil War and remained in service until after World War II except the Blas de Lezo, which was wrecked and sunk during a naval exercise in the 1930s. During the Spanish Civil War, these warships served opposing sides and took part in numerous naval engagements, but were all eventually returned to a unified Spanish Navy after the conflict. Thereafter, none of these light cruisers participated in any major military operations, and they were gradually decommissioned and scrapped between 1950s and 1960s.

Definitions
Builder	Name of the ship's builder
Armament	The number and type of the primary armament
Armor	The thickness of the belt or deck armor
Displacement	Ship displacement at full combat load (Note: Historian Erich Gröner states that full load was defined as "[equal to] type displacement plus full load fuel oil, diesel oil, coal, reserve boiler feed water, aircraft fuel, and special equipment." See:)
Propulsion	Number of shafts, type of propulsion system, and top speed generated
Service	The dates work began and finished on the ship and its ultimate fate
Laid down	The date the keel began to be assembled
Launched	The date the ship was launched
Commissioned	The date the ship was commissioned
Fate	The eventual fate of the ship (e.g., sunk, scrapped)

== History ==
Spain once dominated the seas but was eventually defeated by the United Kingdom, which had risen through the Industrial Revolution. Consequently, Spain began to gradually fall behind its rival in many areas, particularly in technology and productivity. As a result, it had no choice but to learn from the United Kingdom in shipbuilding engineering.

Following its defeat in the Spanish-American War, the Spanish Navy experienced a prolonged period of stagnation, and proposals to rebuild the fleet were repeatedly rejected in the ensuing years. It was not until Antonio Maura, a fervent advocate of naval power, took office that efforts to build up the Spanish fleet were finally accelerated. These efforts included the passage of a series of bills designed to stimulate domestic shipbuilding and the establishment of the Sociedad Española de Construcción Naval. Even after Maura left office, his successors continued to advance the naval construction program.

After World War I, the major maritime powers successively signed the Washington Naval Treaty and the London Naval Treaty. These treaties stipulated that cruisers with main gun calibers under 6.1 inches (155 mm) would be classified as "light cruisers". Prior to this, the Spanish Navy had already begun developing its own light cruiser capabilities. The first of these was the Reina Victoria Eugenia class, which was modeled after the British Town-class light cruisers. After only one ship of the Reina Victoria Eugenia class was built, the Spanish Navy proceeded to copy the British C-class light cruisers, planning to construct four Blas de Lezo-class (also known as Méndez Núñez-class) light cruisers. Ultimately, only two were completed, while the remaining two were redesigned based on the British Royal Navy's E-class light cruisers, which later became the Príncipe Alfonso-class light cruisers.

== Reina Victoria Eugenia ==
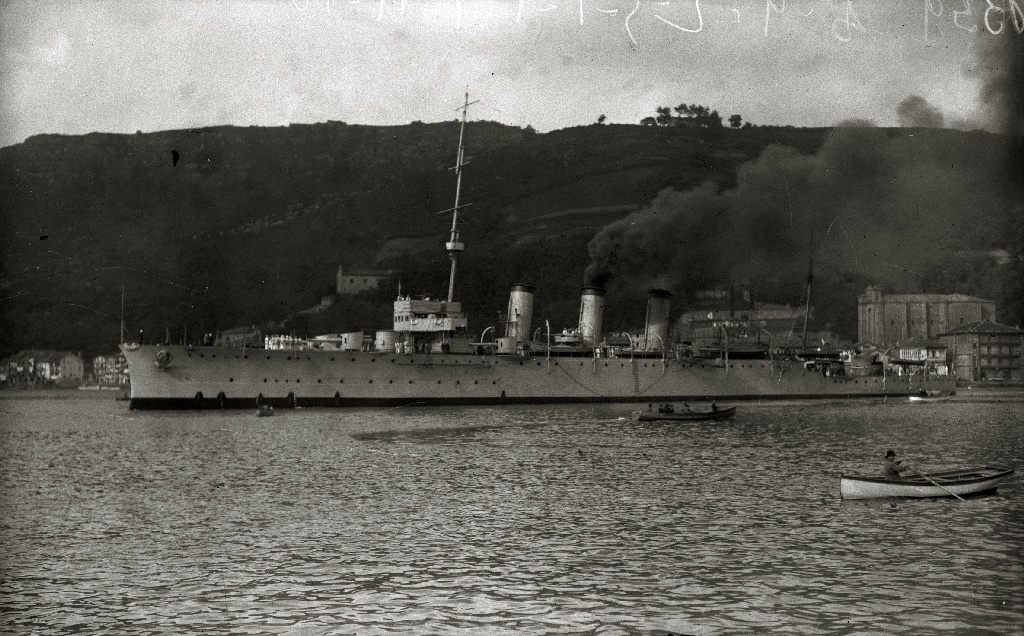
Reina Victoria Eugenia sailing from Pasaya port to the coast of Africa

In 1913, the then Minister of Marine, Amalio Gimeno, proposed spending 343 million pesetas to construct a series of warships and related infrastructure. However, this plan ultimately failed to receive full parliamentary approval. To prevent existing shipbuilding slips from lying idle, a special authorization was granted to build a scout cruiser after the launch of the España-class dreadnoughts, which resulted in the Reina Victoria Eugenia class. Ultimately, only one ship was built: the Reina Victoria Eugenia. The vessel was named in honor of Victoria Eugenie of Battenberg, the wife of King Alfonso XIII of Spain.

In terms of design, the Reina Victoria Eugenia drew more heavily from the fourth batch of the Town-class light cruisers, the Birmingham class. The Birminghams were an unconventional scout cruiser and, being the most advanced light cruiser in the British fleet at the time, was selected by the Maura cabinet to mask the true nature of the Spanish cruiser design. The ship closely resembled the Birminghams in features such as its bow shape and forecastle design. However, its stern configuration was more similar to the first two batches of the Town-class cruisers. The most significant design modification was in the boiler arrangement; the completed Reina Victoria Eugenia had only three boiler rooms. Consequently, one funnel was removed compared to the Birmingham design, reducing the total to three. During a refit in 1937, another boiler room was removed, further reducing the number of funnels to two. For its propulsion system, the ship adopted a twin-shaft configuration, identical to the Chatham class (the third batch of the Town class). However, during sea trials, the ship achieved a top speed of 26.9 knots, surpassing its designed speed of 25.5 knots (47.2 km/h; 29.3 mph).

After entering service, the ship initially served as the fleet flagship and participated in the Rif War in North Africa. In 1931, a bourgeois revolution broke out in Spain, leading to the establishment of a republican government; consequently, the ship was renamed República. During the later stages of the Spanish Civil War, she was converted into a floating battery. Having sustained damage during the conflict, she underwent a major overhaul in 1937, which resulted in significant changes to her appearance. Following this refit, she was renamed Navarra and featured a tall tower-like bridge and a superstructure completely different from her original configuration. Three of her original nine main guns were removed, and the remaining armament was rearranged. She was later reintegrated into the fleet after the Nationalist heavy cruiser Baleares was lost. Towards the end of World War II, she was converted into a training ship and remained in this role until she was struck from the naval register in 1956.

Ship	Builder	Armament	Armor	Displacement	Propulsion	Service			
Ship	Builder	Armament	Armor	Displacement	Propulsion	Laid down	Launched	Commissioned	Fate
Reina Victoria Eugenia	Spain Ferrol	9 × 152 mm (6 in)	76 mm (3.0 in)	5,502 metric tons (5,415 long tons) (as built) 5,590 metric tons (5,502 long tons) (1938)	2 shafts, 12 Yarrow Type boilers, 2 Parsons Type geared turbines, 25.5 knots (47.2 km/h; 29.3 mph), 25,500 shaft horsepower (19,000 kW)	March 31, 1915	April 21, 1920	January 15, 1923	Struck in 1956

== Blas de Lezo class ==
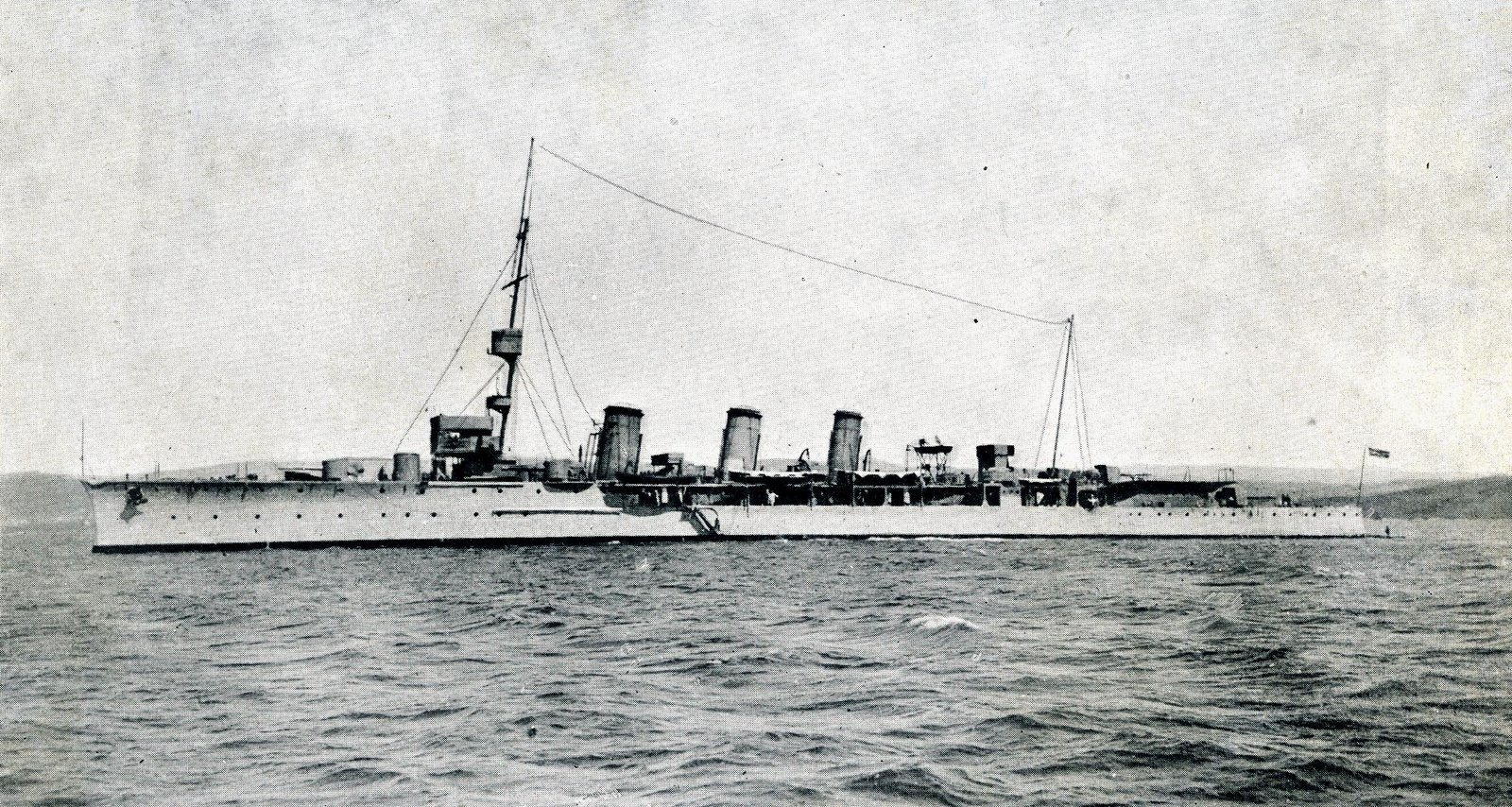
Blas de Lezo on sea trials in 1923

In 1914, then Minister of the Navy Almiral Augusto Miranda y Godoy, proposed an amendment to the naval construction act, which included two scout cruisers. The following year, in 1915, the parliament approved the construction of two additional cruisers. These four cruisers were to be built in two batches over a six-year period at a total cost of 60 million pesetas. Under the 1915 shipbuilding program, the design specifications called for light cruisers slightly smaller than the Reina Victoria Eugenia. The selected design blueprint was based on the fifth batch of the British Royal Navy's C-class light cruisers, the Caledon class. However, the final detailed design featured enhancements in hull dimensions, displacement, and main engine power compared to the original blueprint.

Construction of the first two ships of this class began in 1917 at the Sociedad Española de Construcción Naval (SECN) shipyard in Ferrol. These two vessels were named after Casto Méndez Núñez, the youngest admiral in 19th-century Spanish naval history, and Blas de Lezo y Olavarrieta, who famously defended Cartagena against the British in the West Indies. Because World War I was raging when construction began, Britain, as a major exporter of raw materials, prioritized its own domestic needs, resulting in slow progress for the two ships. To commemorate the centenary of Méndez Núñez's birth, the Spanish government ordered the names of the two ships to be swapped in 1922, ensuring that the ship bearing his name would be completed in time for the 1924 centennial.

Upon completion, the two ships joined the previously commissioned Reina Victoria Eugenia to form a three-ship scout cruiser squadron. By 1925, both vessels were assigned to the Cruiser Squadron and saw action in the Rif War. In 1926, the Blas de Lezo provided mid-ocean support for Ramón Franco's transatlantic flight from Palos de la Frontera to Buenos Aires. She even participated in the international intervention against the Kuomintang's Northern Expedition in Guangdong in 1927. The ship underwent a major refit in 1931. In July 1932, while conducting exercises near Cape Finisterre alongside the Méndez Núñez, she ran aground and sank.

Upon entering service, the Méndez Núñez was initially assigned to port visits and escort missions for VIPs. During the Spanish Civil War, she served in the Republican Navy and saw combat. After being taken over by the Nationalist faction, the ship was converted into an anti-aircraft cruiser, a refit that lasted until 1949. Subsequently, the vessel traveled extensively to participate in various naval exercises and shows of force. In 1963, the Méndez Núñez returned to Spain and was decommissioned at the end of that year. In 1964, the ship was sold at public auction.

Ship	Builder	Armament	Armor	Displacement	Propulsion	Service			
Ship	Builder	Armament	Armor	Displacement	Propulsion	Laid down	Launched	Commissioned	Fate
Méndez Núñez	Spain Ferrol	6 × 152 millimetres (6 in)	76 millimetres (3.0 in)	4,650 metric tons (4,577 long tons) (as built) (Note: Other sources record the displacement as 4,780 metric tons (4,705 long tons).) 4,680 metric tons (4,606 long tons) (in 1947)	4 shafts, 6 Yarrow oil/coal-fired water-tube boilers, 6 Yarrow oil-fired water-tube boilers, 4 Parsons geared steam turbines, 29 knots (54 km/h; 33 mph), 45,000 shaft horsepower (34,000 kW)	September 28, 1917	March 3, 1923	May 1924 (Note: Other sources record the date as May 1925.)	Struck in 1963
Blas de Lezo	Spain Ferrol	6 × 152 millimetres (6 in)	76 millimetres (3.0 in)	4,650 metric tons (4,577 long tons) (Note: Other sources record the displacement as 4,780 metric tons (4,705 long tons).)	4 shafts, 6 Yarrow oil/coal-fired water-tube boilers, 6 Yarrow oil-fired water-tube boilers, 4 Parsons geared steam turbines, 29 knots (54 km/h; 33 mph), 45,000 shaft horsepower (34,000 kW)	April 9, 1917	July 27, 1922	March 1925	Ran aground and sank on July 11, 1932
—	Cancelled, 1919								
—	Cancelled, 1919								

== Almirante Cervera class ==
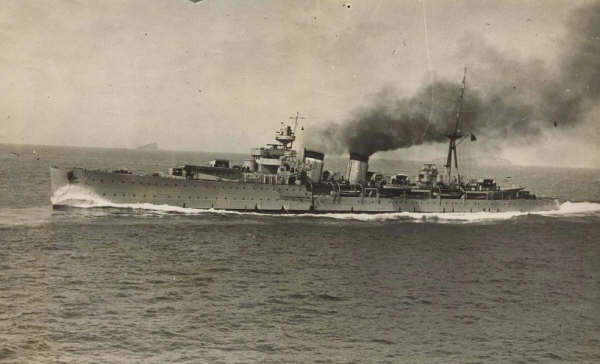
Almirante Cervera underway

During the construction of the Blas de Lezo-class light cruisers by the Spanish Navy, the British continuously updated their own light cruiser designs. Consequently, the original plans for the last two ships of the Blas de Lezo class had to be abandoned in favor of a new design based on the British E-class light cruisers. These two vessels were classified as a separate class, the Almirante Cervera class. Designed by Sir Philip Watts, this class was optimized for the specific requirements of the Spanish Navy based on the E-class blueprint. Visually, these modifications included the addition of one main gun and the installation of new single and twin secondary guns along the centerline. The most significant change was the transition from an alternating machinery layout to a unitized (or grouped) layout, which reduced the number of funnels from three in the original design to two. Furthermore, the hull of this class was longer and narrower than that of the E-class light cruisers.

Ultimately, a total of three ships of this class were built. They were named after the title of the Spanish heir apparent, the 19th-century Spanish naval commanders Pascual Cervera and Topete, and the author of Don Quixote.

Following her commissioning, the Alfonso Príncipe frequently served as the royal yacht for the King during diplomatic engagements. With the outbreak of the civil war, the Alfonso Príncipe and the Miguel de Cervantes joined the Republican Navy in 1931. The former was renamed Libertad ("Freedom" in Spanish) by the Republican government. After retreating to France in 1939, both ships were handed back to Spain. At that time, the Libertad was renamed once again to Galicia. In 1940, the Almirante Cervera underwent a modernization refit, which significantly enhanced her firepower. The other two ships had their superstructures redesigned and were equipped with catapults, enabling them to operate seaplanes. In 1960, the torpedo armaments of all three ships were removed. Throughout the 1960s, these cruisers were gradually struck from the naval register and scrapped.

Ship	Builder	Armament	Armor	Displacement	Propulsion	Service			
Ship	Builder	Armament	Armor	Displacement	Propulsion	Laid down	Launched	Commissioned	Fate
Príncipe Alfonso	Spain Ferrol	3 × 152 millimetres (6 in) (as built)	75 millimetres (3.0 in)	7,475 metric tons (7,357 long tons) (as built) 8,250 metric tons (8,120 long tons) (after 1947)	4 shafts, 8 Yarrow Type boilers, 4 Parsons Type geared turbines, 33 knots (61 km/h; 38 mph), 80,000 shaft horsepower (60,000 kW) (as built)31.5 knots (58.3 km/h; 36.2 mph) (after 1947)	February 1, 1917	July 27, 1922 (Note: Other sources record the date as January 23, 1925.)	August 30, 1925	Decommissioned on February 2, 1970, and sold for scrap in March 1972
Almirante Cervera	Spain Ferrol	3 × 152 millimetres (6 in) (as built)	75 millimetres (3.0 in)	7,475 metric tons (7,357 long tons) (as built) 7,976 metric tons (7,850 long tons) (after 1947)	4 shafts, 8 Yarrow Type boilers, 4 Parsons Type geared turbines, 33 knots (61 km/h; 38 mph), 80,000 shaft horsepower (60,000 kW) (as built)31.5 knots (58.3 km/h; 36.2 mph) (after 1947)	November 25, 1922	October 25, 1925 (Note: Other sources record the date as October 16, 1925.)	May 1927	Struck from the register in 1966 (Note: Other sources record the date as August 31, 1965.), scrapped in March 1970
Miguel de Cervantes	Spain Ferrol	3 × 152 millimetres (6 in) (as built)	75 millimetres (3.0 in)	7,475 metric tons (7,357 long tons) (as built) 8,250 metric tons (8,120 long tons) (after 1947)	4 shafts, 8 Yarrow Type boilers, 4 Parsons Type geared turbines, 33 knots (61 km/h; 38 mph), 80,000 shaft horsepower (60,000 kW) (as built)31.5 knots (58.3 km/h; 36.2 mph) (after 1947)	August 27, 1926	May 17, 1929 (Note: Other sources record the date as May 19, 1928.)	February 10, 1930	Decommissioned in 1958, and struck from the register and scrapped on July 1, 1964
