= Blas =

Blas is mainly a Spanish given name and surname, related to Blaise. It may refer to

== Places ==
- Piz Blas, mountain in Switzerland
- San Blas (disambiguation)

== People ==
- Ricardo Blas Jr. (born 1986) Judo athlete from Guam
- Blas Antonio Sáenz (fl. 1845), Nicaraguan politician
- Blas Avena, American martial artist
- Blas Cabrera Navarro, American physicist
- Blas Cabrera (1878–1945), Spanish physicist
- Blas Cantó (born 1991), Spanish singer
- Blas Castano (born 1998), Dominican baseball player
- Blas Chumacero (1905–1997), Mexican trade union leader
- Blas Cristaldo (born 1964), Paraguayan football (soccer) defender
- Blas de Lezo (1689–1741), Spanish admiral
- Blas de Ledesma (1556—1598), Spanish painter
- Blas Elias (born 1967), American drummer
- Blas Galindo (1910–1993), Mexican composer
- Blas Gallego (born 1941), Spanish artist
- Blas García Ravelo (17th century), Spanish sculptor
- Blas Giunta (born 1963), Argentine football player
- Blas Giraldo Reyes Rodríguez (born 1955), Cuban librarian
- Blas Hernández (1879–1933), Cuban soldier
- Blas Infante (1885–1936), Andalusian politician and writer
- Blas María de la Garza Falcón (1712–1767), Spanish settler of Tamaulipas and South Texas
- Blas Matamoro (born 1942), Argentine writer
- Blas Minor (born 1966), American baseball player
- Blas Monaco (1915–2000), American baseball player
- Blas Ople (1927–2003), Filipino journalist and politician
- Blas Parera (1777–1840), Spanish composer
- Blas Pérez (born 1981), Panamanian footballer
- Blas Piñar (1918–2014), Spanish politician
- Blas Roca Calderio (1908-1987), Cuban revolutionary and politician
- Blas Ruiz (16th century), Spanish explorer
- Blas Valera (1545–1597), Peruvian historian
- Blas Villate (1824–1882), Spanish general
- Ismael Blas Rolón Silvero (1914–2010), Paraguayan bishop
- Juan Blas de Castro (1561–1631), Spanish singer, musician, and composer

== Ships ==
- Blas de Lezo-class cruiser, a class of Spanish Navy light cruisers
- Spanish ship Blas de Lezo, more than one Spanish Navy ship

== Other uses ==
- Basic Linear Algebra Subprograms (BLAS), a mathematical software library
- Blas, a word invented by Jan Baptist van Helmont to describe astral radiation
- List of storms named Blas, used for eight tropical cyclones in the eastern Pacific Ocean and for one Medicane in the Mediterranean Sea
- Blas, an Irish-language radio program produced by BBC Radio Ulster

== See also ==
- "Bás, Fás, Blás", a poem written by Dominic Behan
