= Lezo =

Lezo may refer to:

- Blas de Lezo (1689-1741), Spanish admiral
- Blas de Lezo-class cruiser, class of Spanish Navy light cruisers
- Spanish ship Blas de Lezo, more than one Spanish Navy ship
- Lezo, Aklan, municipality in the province of Aklan, Philippines
- Lezo, Spain, town and municipality in the province of Gipuzkoa, Basque Country, Spain
