= San Blas =

San Blas, the Spanish name for Saint Blaise, may refer to:

== Places ==
=== Argentina ===
- San Blas de los Sauces, in La Rioja Province
- San Blas, La Rioja, in La Rioja Province
- San Blas de los Sauces Department, in La Rioja Province

=== Bulgaria ===
- Sveti Vlas (Свети Влас), Burgas Province

=== Ecuador ===
- San Blas, Quito

=== Malta ===
- San Blas, Nadur

=== Mexico ===
- San Blas, Nayarit
- San Blas Atempa, Oaxaca
- San Blas, Baja California Sur
- Marismas Nacionales-San Blas mangroves, an ecoregion

=== Panama ===
- Guna Yala, an autonomous territory, formerly called San Blas
- San Blas Islands, off the Caribbean coast
- San Blas Range, a mountain range

=== Paraguay ===
- San Blas (Asunción)

=== Peru ===
- San Blas (Cusco), a neighbourhood in the historic city centre of Cusco

=== Spain ===
- San Blas (Madrid), a district of Madrid
  - San Blas (Madrid Metro), a station on Line 7
- Church of San Blas (Villarrobledo)

=== United States ===
- Cape San Blas, part of a peninsula in Gulf County, Florida
- Church San Blas de Illescas of Coamo Puerto Rico

== See also ==
- San Blas jay, a bird of Mexico
- Blas (disambiguation)
