= Alhucemas landing =

1925 Franco-Spanish operation that ended the Rif War

- Part of the Rif War
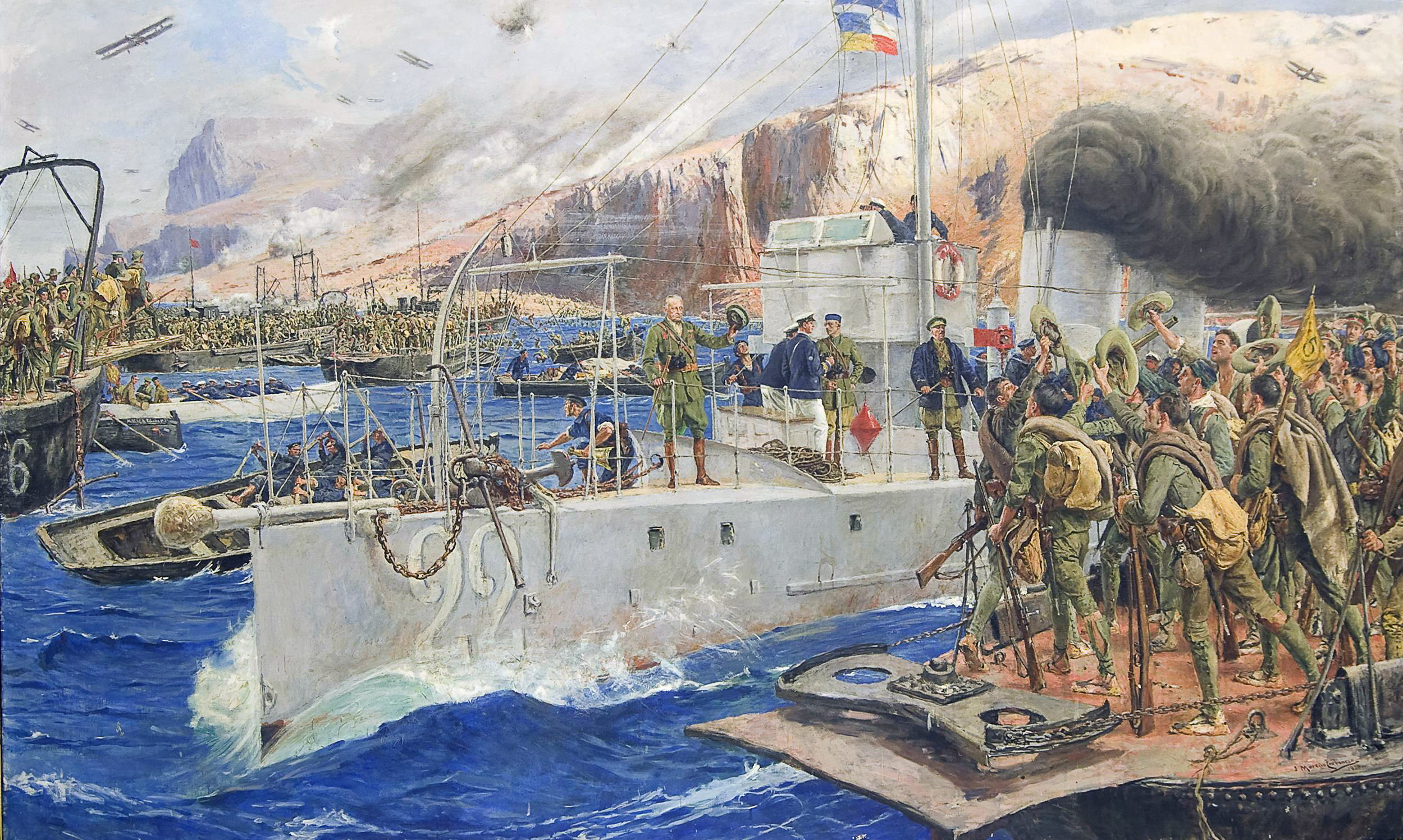
- Desembarco de Alhucemas by José Moreno Carbonero
Date	8 September 1925
Location	Alhucemas, Spanish Morocco
Result	Spanish-French victory

Belligerents
Spain; France	Riffian Republic

Commanders and leaders
Miguel Primo de Rivera; José Sanjurjo; Philippe Pétain	Abd el-Krim; Ahmed Heriro Jebli

Strength
13,000; 11 tanks 3 battleships 5 light cruisers 1 protected cruiser 1 aircraft carrier 2 destroyers 2 monitors 7 gunboats 18 patrol boats 6 torpedo boats 4 tugs 58 transport ships 160 aircraft	9,000

Casualties and losses
2,336 casualties: 361 killed; 205 indigenous; 103 european; 24 officers; 1,975 wounded; 1,080 indigenous; 786 european; 109 officers	700 killed

The Alhucemas landing (Spanish: Desembarco de Alhucemas; also known as Al Hoceima landing) was a military amphibious landing which took place on 8 September 1925 at Alhucemas by the Spanish Army and Navy and by an allied French naval and aerial contingent, that would put an end to the Rif War. It is considered the first amphibious landing in history involving the use of tanks and massive seaborne air support. Alhucemas is seen as a precursor of the Allied amphibious landings in World War II, and the first successful combined operation of the 20th century.

The operations consisted in landing a force of 13,000 Spanish soldiers transported from Ceuta and Melilla by a combined Spanish-French naval fleet. The commander of the operation was the then dictator of Spain, general Miguel Primo de Rivera, and, as the executive head of the landing forces at the beach of Alhucemas bay, general José Sanjurjo, under whose orders were two army brigades from Ceuta and Melilla, led by Leopoldo Saro Marín and Emilio Fernández Pérez, respectively. Among the officers of the Ceuta brigade, there was the then colonel Francisco Franco who, for his leadership of the Spanish Legion troops in this action, was promoted to brigadier general.

== Background ==
After the Battle of Annual in July 1921, the Spanish army was unable to regain control of the central Rif region. It undertook a containment policy aimed at preventing the expansion of the rebel zone, executed by limited military actions of local nature. In parallel, the Minister of War ordered the creation of an inquiry commission, led by General Juan Picasso González, which developed the report known as Expediente Picasso. Political forces, public opinion, and the army were divided between supporters of leaving the Protectorate and advocates of restarting the military operations as soon as possible.

In September 1923, the coup of general Primo de Rivera occurred, who at first supported the abandonment of the Protectorate, and withdrew a great number of isolated outposts from the inner region of Jebala to a line of strongholds linking Larache, Tetuan and Ceuta, known as Estella line. A similar plan was drafted for a withdrawal from the regions surrounding Melilla, but it was rejected by the majority of the officers in the Army of Africa. In 1925, however, and after new attacks by Abd el-Krim that caused numerous casualties during the Spanish retreat from Xauen, Primo de Rivera became a strong supporter of a decisive offensive to defeat the Rifian leader and restore full Spanish authority in the Protectorate.

== Planning ==
In April 1925 a crucial event occurred: Abd el-Krim, confident of his success against the Spanish, attacked the French zone of the Protectorate. This opened the doors for a Spanish-French agreement to make a common front against the Rifians. To this end, in June 1925 the Madrid Conference took place, which set out the necessary actions. Among the agreements reached there were the plan for a Spanish landing on the Alhucemas bay, with the cooperation and support of a combined air and naval Spanish-French force.

Alhucemas, home of the Kabile (tribe) of Beni Ouriaghel, to which Abd el-Krim belonged, was the focus of the ongoing Rif rebellion. All Spanish land operations, included the Disaster of Annual in 1921, were aimed at the occupation of Alhucemas, but all of them failed, mainly due to overextended resupply lines. The first plans for a landing on Alhucemas dates back to 1913, devised by General Francisco Gomez Jordana.

The operation initially proposed the landing of 18,000 men, although 13,000 would eventually be landed, to build-up a base of operations in the area of Al Hoceima and deal with an estimated force of 11,000 Rifians. This operation was the first amphibious action involving Spain in the modern era, and posed a concern to the Spanish authorities. As if it was not enough, the terrain presented difficulties in performing the assault, besides being a well-known area for the Rifians. Aware of the risk, Primo de Rivera carefully designed the landing. The main amphibious craft to be used in the operation were no other than the surviving X-lighters from Gallipoli, upgraded and armoured in Spanish shipyards, where they were known as K-boats.

The probable knowledge of the planned landing prompted Abd el-Krim to fortify the area of the bay itself, placing artillery and mines along the shores. These circumstances forced the Spanish command to change the landing site, choosing Ixdain and Cebadilla Beach, west of the Bay of Al Hoceima, in a sector southwest of Los Frailes point. The first major effort to seize the beachhead would be exercised in those beaches; once the landing would be successfully achieved, the second effort would be either in some of the adjacent creeks, like Cala del Quemado to the east, or a deepening and expansion of the initial beachhead, depending on the circumstances.

Primo de Rivera and other high officers had conceived a massive landing of troops at Alhucemas as early as May, even before the July 1925 conference at Madrid between Phillipe Petain and the Spanish dictator. The execution was postponed first to July, and then to September, in order to coordinate actions with the French military.

== The amphibious landings ==
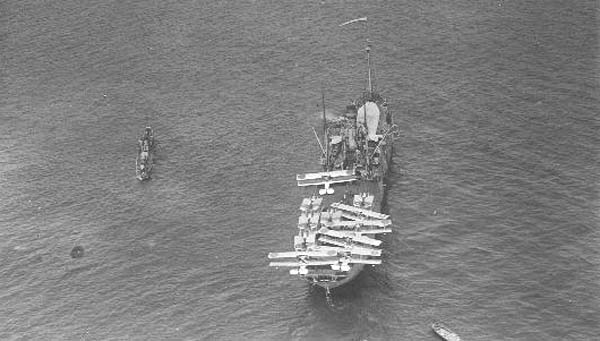
The seaplane carrier Dédalo operating her aircraft and airship off Alhucemas, September 1925

The supreme commander was Primo de Rivera, while the command of the ground forces was held by General José Sanjurjo. The operational headquarters was established aboard the Spanish battleship Alfonso XIII, whose wireless capabilities allowed her to function as the main command and control center to coordinate the activities of ground, naval and air forces involved in the joint operation. The Alfonso XIII was assisted by her sister Jaime I and the French Paris in providing suppressive fire to the ground forces. They were joined by the Spanish cruisers Blas de Lezo, Mendez Nuñez, Victoria Eugenia and Reina Regente, along with the French Strasbourg and Metz. The Spanish fortress at Alhucemas island, right in front of the bay, added to the heavy four-hour bombardment of the Rifian positions with 24 guns and howitzers and two mortars. There were 162 aircraft committed to support the ground troops, including Breguet XIX, Bristol F.2 and Potez XV of the Spanish Army, Macchi M.24 and Supermarine Scarab seaplanes of the Spanish Navy, and French F.65 Farman Goliath flying boats. The Supermarine Scarabs were embarked on the seaplane carrier Dédalo, while the Macchi M.24s launched their sorties from Bou Areg, a lagoon south of Melilla. Dédalo also carried an airship, used in the dual role of air support and artillery adjustment.

=== Preliminary actions ===
==== Siege of Kudia Tahar ====
Abd el-Krim had received forehand information of the landings, since Spanish preparations at Ceuta and Melilla were quite publicised. He then tried to deal a spectacular blow to the Spanish defenses around Tetouan, the protectorate's capital, where he sent his second-in-command, former Raisuli supporter Ahmed-el-Heriro. The plan consisted in breaking the Estella Line in the mountain range just south of Tetouan, opening the door to the conquest of the city. The most advanced outpost in that region was the stronghold of Kudia Tahar, just 6 kilometres (3.7 mi) south of the Martil river, defended by Aragonese and Catalan troops and supported by a battery of 75 mm mountain guns. The assault began on 3 September 1925, and Kudia Tahar came under siege. The Rifian offensive forced Primo de Rivera to send back to Ceuta Legion and Regulares forces from Alhucemas. These troops, supported by 16 Breguet XIXs planes, relieved the Spanish position on 13 September. Rifian forces were beaten back with heavy casualties.

==== Fleet diversionary operations ====
In order to deceive Abd el-Krim on the real landing point, both convoys shelled Rifian coastal redoubts; the Ceuta flotilla attacked Oued Laou, mounting a diversionary amphibious operation, while the Melilla flotilla, supported by French warships, feinted a landing in Sidi Dris, both of them on 6 September. The diversionary missions were repeated on 29 September on Ras Afraou and Sidi Dris, in support of the Spanish breakout from the landing area.

==== Chemical warfare ====
During the weeks leading up to the landings, Spanish aircraft targeted the Riffian rearguard using 20 kilograms (44 lb) C-5 chemical bombs, manufactured in Melilla since 1922 and each loaded with 6.5 kilograms (14 lb) of mustard gas. These strikes aimed to inflict casualties on Riffian forces in zones where Spanish troops would only advance once the chemical hazard had cleared.. On August 29, 1925, Sanjurjo telegraphed Primo de Rivera, reporting that mustard gas attacks around Alhucemas resulted in 160 rebel deaths and 180 cases of blindness. Though likely exaggerated, these figures generally align with later evaluations released by the Delegation of Indigenous Affairs following Abd-el-Krim's defeat.

=== Beachhead ===
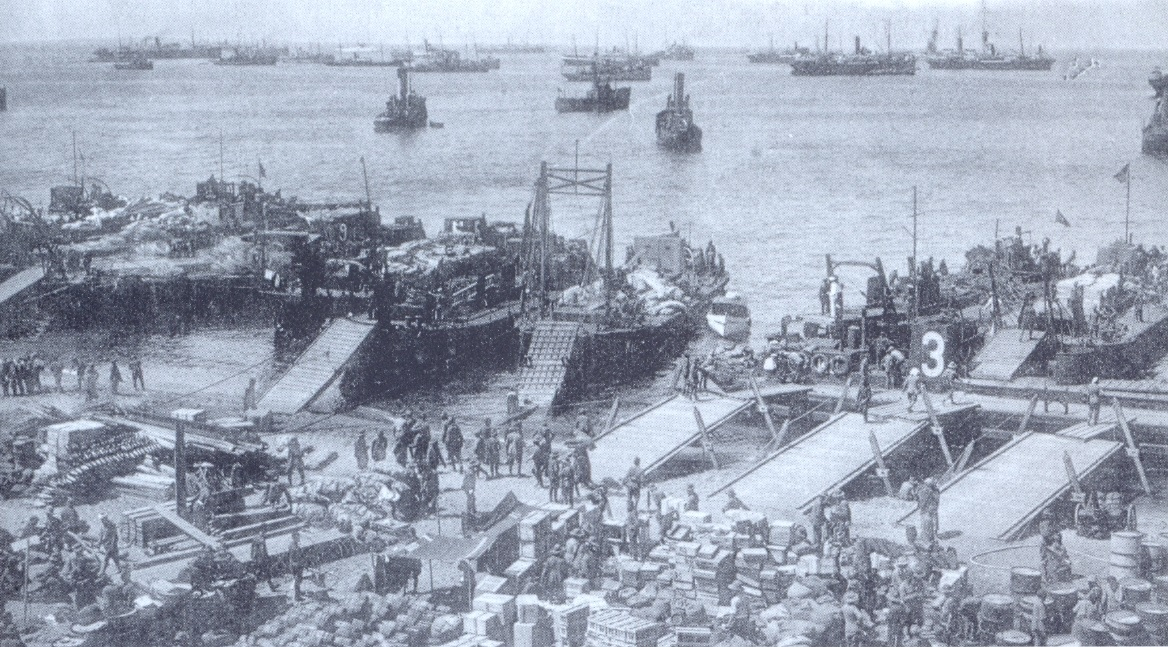
Spanish troops landing supplies at Cebadilla beach

The initial landings' date in Alhucemas was originally set for 7 September, but poor weather, which scattered the X-lighters, other amphibious craft and ships, resulted in a rescheduled for the following day at mid-morning. The spearhead of the invasion would be two brigades made of indigenous forces (Regulares and Spanish-allied troops loyal to the Khalifa of Morocco) led by the Spanish Legion. Most of the infantry involved in the landing were actually indigenous troops. One of the forces of the two-pronged assault would depart from Ceuta, the other from Melilla. The troops eventually embarked on the overcrowded X-lighters, and had to endure several hours in these conditions after the operation was delayed.

The Ceuta Brigade was commanded by General Leopoldo Saro Marín and the Melilla Brigade by General Emilio Fernández Pérez. Each brigade was split into two columns. Ceuta Brigade's leading column, in charge of Colonel Francisco Franco, would be the first to land at 11:40 hours. The shoal allowed the X-lighters to approach barely 50 mts to the shore, casting doubts about the feasibility of Ixdain as a landing point. At Franco's initiative, the infantry waded the gap between the lighters and the beach carrying their rifles and equipment over their heads. A company of light tanks, part of Franco's column and intended at this phase to support the troops and the supply area as 'mobile bunkers' protecting the landing, was unable to leave the amphibious craft in these conditions. Caught by surprise by a landing too far to the west, Rifian reaction was slow and weak. Franco's forces, supported by the restless bombardment of the Spanish and French fleet and the combined air forces, moved eastward, securing Cebadilla beach, which had been mined. The troops had a foreknowledge of the minefield thanks to a previous beach reconnaissance carried out on a motor boat by Captain Carlos Boado, the naval officer who commanded the landing lighters. After a few hours, the Legion and the Regulars had taken over the cliffs and slopes around the cove, capturing an enemy position with two heavy machine guns and a 75 mm piece of artillery. The minefield at Cebadilla beach was blown-up by sappers at midday, giving the green light to a second wave of landings in this sector at 13:00. The tanks, 11 Renault FT, landed on Los Frailes beach, further east, on 9 September. Other sources fix the date on the same 8 September at 15:00 hours. The tanks were then driven across the coast to their camp between Cebadilla and Ixdain. They were deployed in forward positions to defend the beachhead and the resupply zone during the next two weeks, when the tanks launched their first offensive operations.

The Melilla Brigade did not land on Cebadilla beach till 11 September, due to cross sea. They endured the first Rifian counter-attacks on the heights of Morro Nuevo, in the eastern part of the beachhead, on the nights of 11 and 12 of September. The indigenous forces of the brigade, commanded by Colonel José Enrique Varela, bore the brunt of the Rifian assault, carried out by Abd el-Krim's selected unit, the juramentados ("the sworn ones"). The second night Varela's men became short of ammunition, and had to rely on cartridges borrowed from the recently landed marines company. The mortars of the brigade also played a key role in repelling the attacks.

Further advances were delayed by a shortage of water. Bad weather hampered the supply mission of the water tanker vessels, while the Rifian artillery shelled the beachhead at night, to avoid being pinpointed by observation aircraft. Sea conditions also hindered the landing of mules, which were necessary for the transporting of supplies from the barges to the forward positions. One of the solutions found by the Spanish command to overcome the rough seas and get the supplies disembarked was the use of wooden floating docks, a crude percursor of the D-Day Mulberry harbours.

=== Breakout ===
After a forward reconnaissance carried out by indigenous troops the previous day at dusk, Sanjurjo ordered a massive offensive on Rifian positions in the mountains surrounding the landing sites at 07:00 of 23 September. Preceded by a massive barrage of naval and ground artillery, combined with air strikes, the Renault FT tank company spearheaded the offensive. The Ceuta Brigade, split in the 6th and 7th Legion Flags, and supported by the tanks on their left flank, launched an assault on enemy positions in and around Mount Malmusi, while on the extreme left side of the beachhead, the Melilla Brigade, led by indigenous troops, advanced toward Morro Viejo and the strategic cove of Cala del Quemado.

In the sector of the Ceuta Brigade, the initial attack of the indigenous forces was almost disrupted by the explosion of a massive mine, but the quick officers' reaction kept the offensive's momentum. Rifian resistance to the east was weak, and an envelopment maneuver on hostile redoubts by Colonel Goded's infantry and the tanks company, supported by a frontal assault of Regulares and indigenous troops from Morro Nuevo, secured Morro Viejo and Cala del Quemado cove by 09:45. Cala del Quemado replaced Cebadilla as the main logistics hub for the Spanish forces from there on.

At 10:50, supported by an intense artillery barrage, the Ceuta Brigade, led by Colonel Franco, attacked the main Rifian positions in the high slopes of Mount Malmusi. The strongest resistance was found in a ravine, where a substantial number of Abd el-Krim troops were trapped and eventually crushed by the combined assault of the 6th Legion Flag on the center and the 7th Legion Flag supported by the tanks company on the left flank. Dédalo's airship provided close air support to the assault on Malmusi, which fell to the Ceuta Brigade by the afternoon. The Spanish consolidated their positions by 26 September, the last time the beachhead was hit by Rifian artillery.

A shortage of supplies and bad weather slowed down the offensive until 30 September. The next targets for the Ceuta Brigade were Mount Las Palomas and Mount Buyibar, while to the east, the Melilla Brigade was bound to conquer Mount Taramara and Mount Taganin. Both brigades had taken all their objectives by 13:00. The 7th Legion Flag and the tanks company swept the reedbeds across the rivers Tixdirt and Isli. On 1 October, the Melilla Brigade crossed the river Isli into the kabile of Beni Urriaghel, now supported by indirect fire from Alhucemas island. The Ceuta Brigade marched through the Amekran Massif, suppressing the last Rifian redoubts defending Axdir. The capital of the rebel republic fell the next day.

== Aftermath ==
The Alhucemas landing was the turning point of the Rif War, and the beginning of the end of Abd el-Krim's political influence. The decision of Primo de Rivera to halt the offensive operations until the next spring bore some criticism among military historians, but his intentions were to force the stunned Rifian leader into negotiations with Spain and France from a weaker position rather than risking further losses and casualties.

The Spanish forces lost 24 officers, 132 European soldiers and 205 indigenous troops. There were 109 officers, 786 European soldiers and 1080 indigenous troops wounded in action.

Axdir, until then capital of the Republic of the Rif, was utterly plundered by Regulares, Legion soldiers and indigenous troops on 2 October.

== Sources ==
- Bachoud, André: Los españoles ante las campañas de Marruecos. Madrid, Espasa-Calpe, 1988
- Goded, Manuel: Marruecos. Etapas de la pacificación. Madrid, C.I.A.P., 1932
- Hernández Mir, Francisco: Del desastre a la victoria. Madrid, Imprenta Hispánica, 1927
- Larios de Medrano, Justo: España en Marruecos. Historia secreta de la campaña. Madrid, Stampa, 1925
- Martín Tornero, Antonio (1991): El desembarco de Alhucemas. Organización, ejecución y consecuencias. En: Revista de Historia militar, año XXV, nº 70. Madrid, Servicio Histórico Militar. ISSN 0482-5748
- Matthieu, Roger: Mémoires d' Abd-el-Krim. París, Librairie des Champs-Elysées, 1927
- Ros Andreu, Juan Bautista: La conquista de Alhucemas. Novela histórica. Las Palmas, Tipografía La provincia, 1932
- Woolman, David S.: Abd-el-Krim y la guerra del Rif. Barcelona, Oikos-Tau, 1988
- Domínguez Llosá, Santiago: El desembarco de Alhucemas. 2002. ISBN 978-84-338-2919-1
