= Spanish ship Blas de Lezo =

Various Spanish Navy ships

Three ships of the Spanish Navy have borne the name Blas de Lezo, after the Spanish admiral Blas de Lezo y Olavarrieta (1689–1741):

- Blas de Lezo, a Blas de Lezo-class light cruiser commissioned in 1925 that sank in 1932.
- Blas de Lezo (D65), previously the Gearing-class destroyer USS Noa (DD-841), a Churruca-class destroyer that served in the Spanish Navy from 1973 to 1991.
- Blas de Lezo (F103), an Álvaro de Bazán-class guided missile frigate commissioned in 2004.

== See also ==
- Blas de Lezo-class cruiser
