= Leopoldo Saro =

Spanish military general (1878–1936)

The Most Excellent The Count of Playa de Ixdain OSH
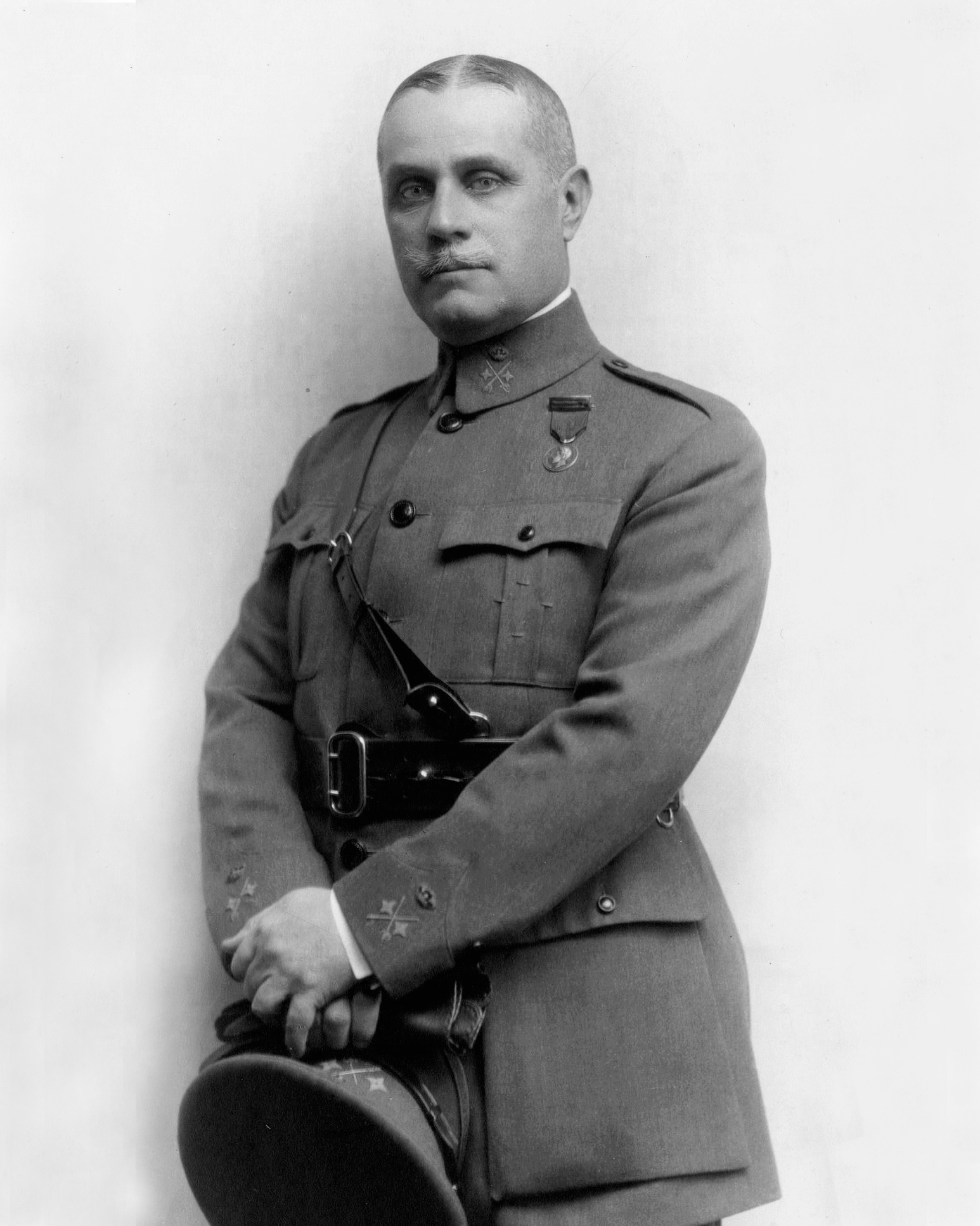
- Born: Leopoldo Saro y Marín; January 11, 1878; Morón, Cuba
- Died: August 19, 1936 (aged 58); Madrid, Spain
- Military career
- Service years: 1895–1932
- Rank: General
- Conflicts: Spanish–American War; Second Melillan campaign Rif War

Leopoldo Saro y Marín, 1st Count of Playa de Ixdain (January 11, 1878 – August 19, 1936) was a Spanish military general. His success in the Alhucemas landing earned him the title of Conde de la Playa de Ixdain, for the beach where the troops he led landed.

== Early life ==
On January 11, 1878, Saro was born as Leopoldo Sato y Marin in Morón, Cuba.

== Career ==
In 1921 during the Rif War, Saro was posted to Morocco, where he stands out in numerous military actions with the generals Cabanellas, Sanjurjo and Berenguer among others, resulting in his promotion to the rank of general.

General Saro was a member of the conspiracy nucleus known as the Quadrilateral that played an important role in the Coup of Primo de Rivera in September 1923. Not a political man, he returned quickly to Africa to organize the preparations of the Alhucemas landing, where he directed with success one of the columns of attack, by whose action was promoted to General of division and the concession of Count of Playa de Ixdain on behalf of Alfonso XIII.

With the arrival of the Second Republic, General Saro leaves the service and is prosecuted by a Tribunal of Political Responsibilities for his actions in the 1923 ruling, for which he was sentenced for the crime of high treason and aid, and entered in prison, to be amnestied in 1934.

== Personal life ==
On August 19, 1936, Saro was assassinated in Madrid by Republican militias, in spite of not being proven his adherence to Franco's military uprising.
