= Blas de Ledesma =

Spanish painter

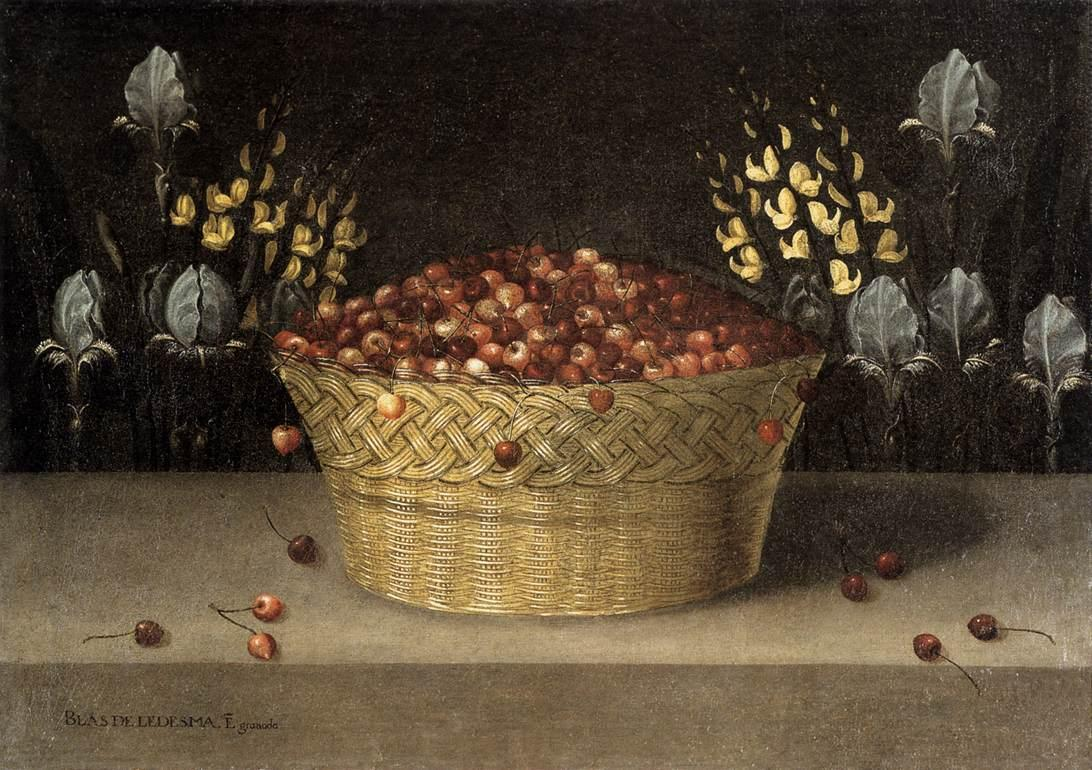
Basket of Cherries and Flowers, Blas de Ledesma

Blas de Ledesma was a Spanish painter in the early 17th century. Francisco Pacheco mentions him in Arte de la Pintura (Art of Painting). He was known to work in Granada, and in 1614, he designed a fresco for the Alhambra. His works are difficult to properly attribute, as there are many similar Spanish still life paintings with his signature, and he is sometimes confused with Blas de Prado.
