= Church of San Blas (Villarrobledo) =

- Iglesia de San Blas (Spanish)
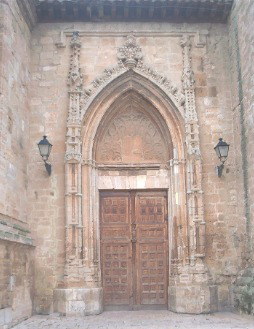

- Location within Spain
- 39.263905°N 2.603884°W
- Location: Villarrobledo, Spain

Spanish Cultural Heritage
- Official name: Iglesia de San Blas
- Type: Non-movable
- Criteria: Monument
- Designated: 1977
- Reference no.: RI-51-0004244

The Church of San Blas (Spanish: Iglesia de San Blas) is a church located in Villarrobledo, Spain. It was declared Bien de Interés Cultural in 1977.

The original church was built in mid-15th-century Gothic-style, but later refurbishments add different styles. The retablo dates from the 18th century.
