= San Blas, Quito =

Coordinates: 0°13′6.9″S 78°30′17.7″W

San Blas is an electoral parish Parish (administrative division) (parroquia electorale urban) or district of Quito. The parish was established as a result of the October 2004 political elections when the city was divided into 19 urban electoral parishes.
