= San Blas (Asunción) =

- Barrio
- Location within Paraguay
- Country: Paraguay
- Autonomous Capital District: Gran Asunción
- City: Asunción

Area
  - Total: 0.54 km^{2} (0.21 sq mi)
- Elevation: 43 m (141 ft)

Population
  - Total: 8,815

San Blas is a neighbourhood (barrio) of Asunción, Paraguay.
