= Spanish cruiser Blas de Lezo =

Spanish light cruiser of 1925–1932

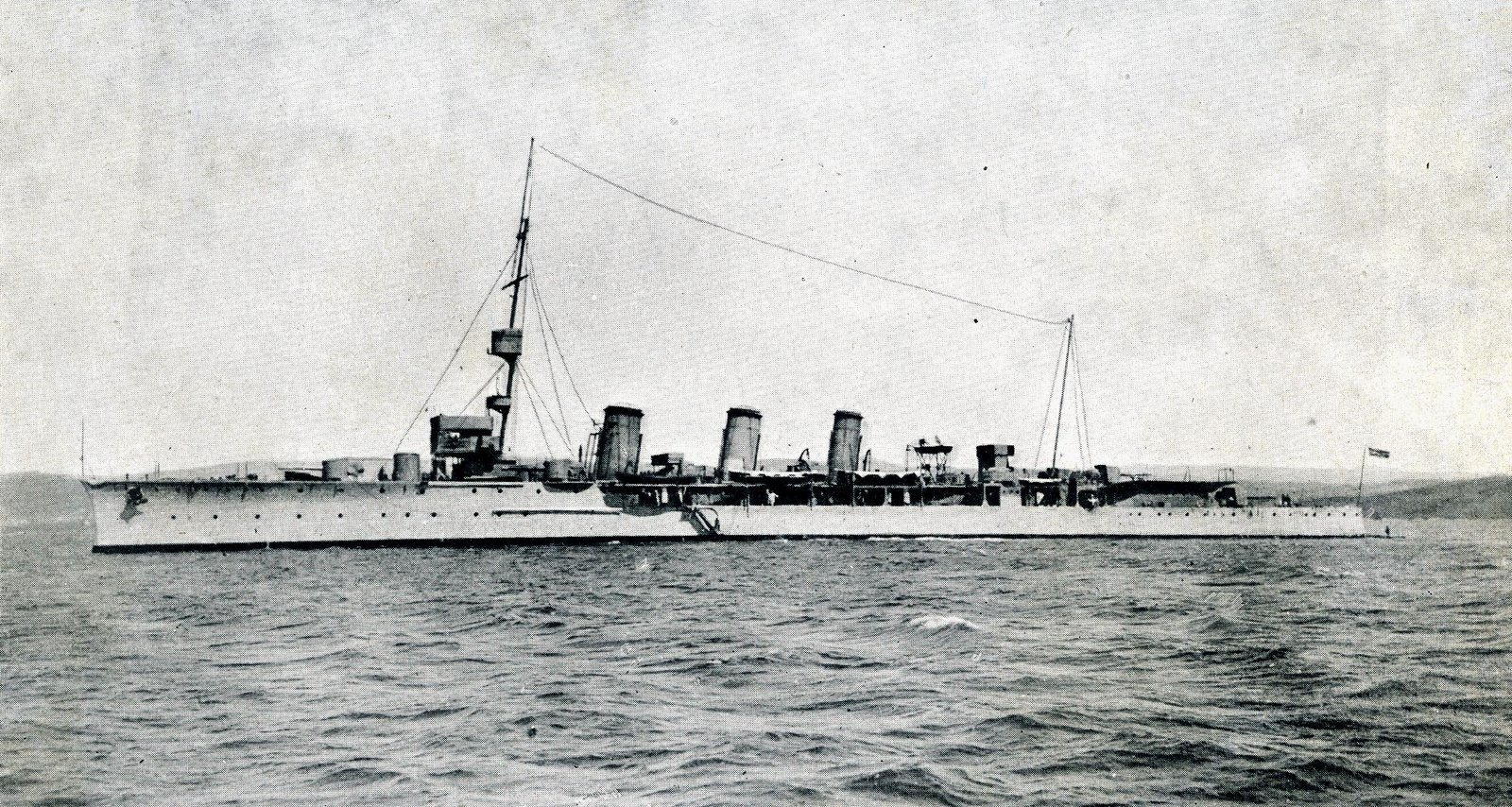
- Blas de Lezo during shakedown in 1923.

History

Spain
- Name: Méndez Núñez
- Namesake: Casto Méndez Núñez (1824–1869), Spanish admiral
- Operator: Spanish Navy
- Builder: SECN, Ferrol, Spain
- Laid down: 1920
- Launched: 3 March 1923
- Renamed: Blas de Lezo May 1924
- Namesake: Blas de Lezo y Olavarrieta (1689–1741), Spanish admiral
- Commissioned: March 1925
- Fate: Sank 11 July 1932

General characteristics
- Displacement: 4,780 long tons (4,860 t) standard; 6,045 long tons (6,142 t) full load
- Length: 140.82 m (462 ft 0 in) overall; 134.11 m (440 ft 0 in) between perpendiculars
- Beam: 14.02 m (46 ft 0 in)
- Height: 7.72 m (25 ft 4 in)
- Draught: 5.6 m (18 ft 4 in) maximum
- Installed power: 45,000 hp (33,556 kW)
- Propulsion: Four Parsons geared turbines, 12 Yarrow boilers, four shafts
- Speed: 29 knots (54 km/h)
- Range: 5,000 nmi (9,300 km; 5,800 mi) at 13 knots (24 km/h; 15 mph)
- Complement: 320
- Armament: As built: 6 × 152 mm (6 in) guns in single mounts; 4 × 47mm guns; Added 1930: 12 × 533 mm (21 in) torpedo tubes in four triple mounts
- Armour: Belt 76–51 mm (3–2 in); Deck 25 mm (1 in); Conning tower 25 mm (1 in)

Blas de Lezo was a Spanish Navy Blas de Lezo-class light cruiser commissioned in 1925. She took part in the Rif War in 1925; supported part of the 1926 transatlantic flight of the flying boat Plus Ultra, piloted by Ramón Franco and Julio Ruiz de Alda Miqueleiz; and deployed to China during unrest there in 1927. She struck a rock and sank in 1932.

== Characteristics ==
Blas de Lezo.

The Blas de Lezo-class ships were ordered as "fast cruisers" inspired by the design of the British C-class light cruisers. They were slower than the C-class, however, which in service proved to be their main limitation as combat ships, and they were reclassified as light cruisers as a result.

The ships were 134.11 metres (440 ft 0 in) long between perpendiculars and 140.82 metres (462 ft 0 in) long overall. They had a beam of 14.02 metres (46 ft 0 in), a maximum draft of 5.6 metres (18 ft 4 in), and a height of 7.72 metres (25 ft 4 in). Their standard displacement was 4,780 tons, and they displaced 6,045 tons at full load.

The ships were armed with six Vickers 152-millimetre (6 in) guns in single mounts, two forward, two aft, one on either side amidships, as well as four 47-millimetre (1.9 in) anti-aircraft guns located along the sides between the funnels. In 1930, twelve 533-millimetre (21 in) torpedo tubes of in four triple mounts were installed.

The propulsion system, which consisted of four sets of Parsons turbines, six coal-fired Yarrow boilers, six oil-fired Yarrow boilers, generated 43,000 horsepower (32,065 kW) and drove four propellers. The ships had a maximum speed of 29 knots (54 km/h; 33 mph). The fuel capacity was 730 tons of fuel oil and 800 tons of coal, giving the ships a range of 5,000 nautical miles (9,300 km; 5,800 mi) at an economical cruising speed of 13 knots (24 km/h; 15 mph).

The ships were armored, with 50 to 75 millimetres (2.0 to 3.0 in) of belt armor, 25 millimetres (0.98 in) of deck armor, and a conning tower with 152 millimetres (6 in) of armor. Each ship had a crew of 320 men.

== Construction and commissioning ==
The Spanish Cortes Generales approved the construction of four "fast cruisers" on 17 February 1915. The first two became the Blas de Lezo-class ships, while the second pair became the ships of the Almirante Cervera-class class. Spanish budgetary problems and a shortage of raw materials during World War I (1914–1918) delayed construction of the ships.

Blas de Lezo was laid down in 1920 by the Sociedad Española de Construcción Naval (SECN, English: Spanish Naval Construction Society) at Ferrol, Spain, with the name Méndez Núñez as the second ship of the Blas de Lezo class, and was launched on 3 May 1923. While she was fitting out, an order of May 1924 swapped her name with that of the first ship of the class, previously known as Blas de Lezo, so that the first ship's commissioning in 1924 could honor the centenary of Contralmirante (Counter Admiral) Casto Méndez Núñez.

Now named Blas de Lezo, the second ship carried out her first sea trials in early May 1924. She conducted tests of her steam turbines and auxiliary machinery in November 1924 and her final sea trials in February 1925. She was commissioned in 1925.

== Service history ==
=== 1925–1927 ===
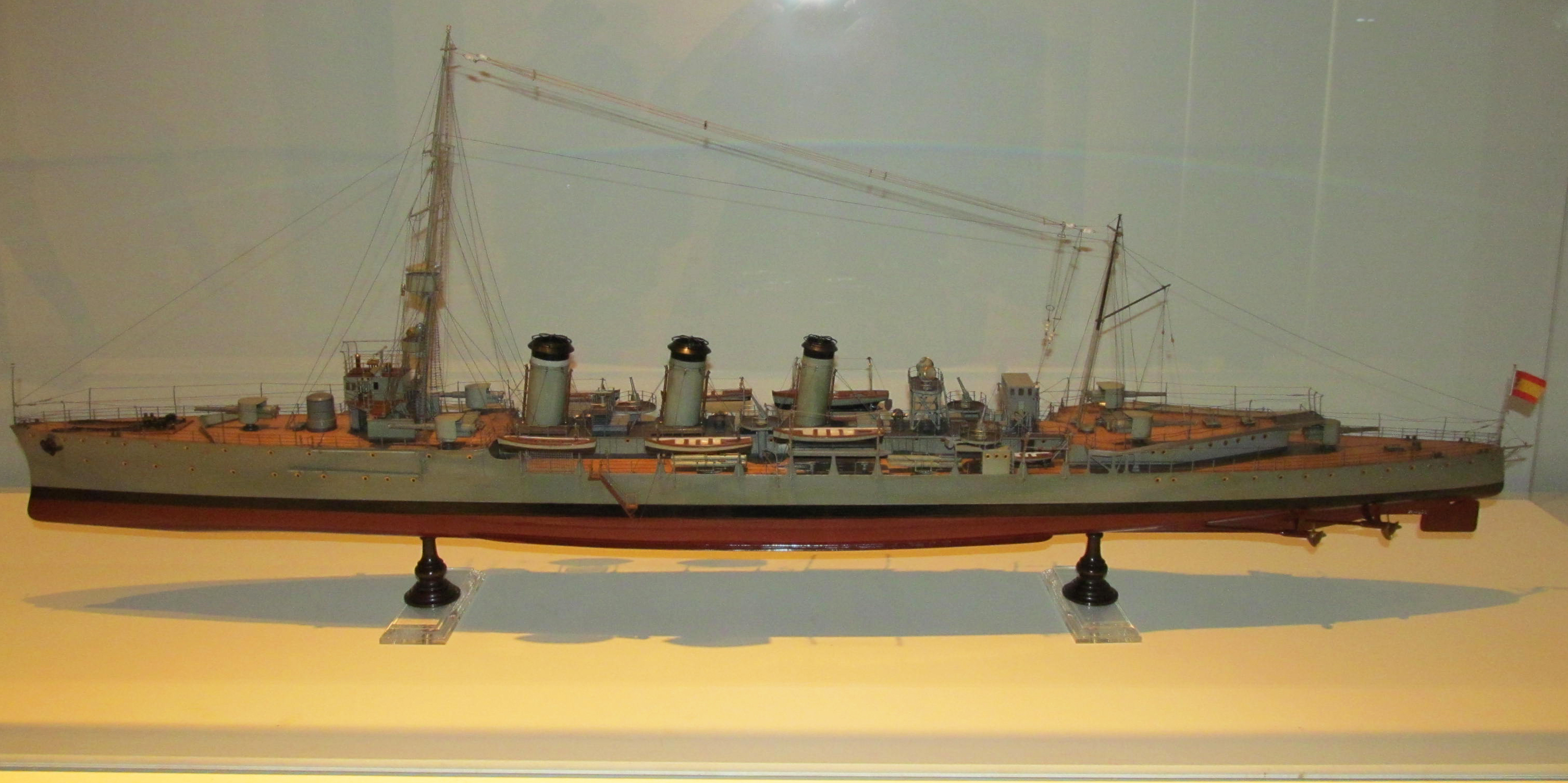
A model of Blas de Lezo at the Naval Museum of Madrid.

Blas de Lezo, her sister ship Méndez Núñez, and the destroyers Alsedo and Velasco were at Ceuta on the coast of North Africa in mid-July 1925 when they departed for Ferrol, Spain. On 27 July 1925 the four ships arrived at Santander, where King Alfonso XIII received them. A French Navy squadron consisting of two battleships and two destroyers also arrived at Santander. The Spanish royal family and both light cruisers were on hand at Santander on 3 August 1925 when Alsedo and Velasco were presented with their battle ensigns, acquired by popular subscription. On 5 August 1925 the two light cruisers arrived at Málaga, and on 11 August they were back in Ferrol. After refuelling, they got underway on 13 August bound for the coast of Spanish Morocco, where Spanish forces had been fighting Rifians in the Rif War since 1921. They rendezvoused with the Training Squadron in the Bay of Gibraltar on the afternoon of 19 August 1925.

In September 1925, the Spanish Navy assembled two squadrons for a landing at Al Hoceima during the ongoing Rif War. The Training Squadron was one of them, and it gathered at Ceuta. Consisting of Blas de Lezo, Méndez Núñez, Alsedo, Velasco, and the battleships Alfonso XIII and Jaime I, the Training Squadron left Ceuta on 6 September and disembarked Spanish Army troops in an amphibious landing on Cebadilla Beach west of Al Hoceima (Spanish: Alhucemas) on 8 September. Blas de Lezo remained off the landing beach until 2 October 1925, when she headed for the Arsenal de La Carraca at San Fernando, Spain. She got underway from the arsenal on 23 October to return to military operations off Melilla, where she operated until departing for Ceuta on 25 November. In mid-December 1925 she was stationed at Melilla.

On 16 January 1926, Blas de Lezo got underway from Cádiz bound for the Cape Verde Islands, where she rendezvoused with Alsedo at Praia on 23 January to await the arrival of the Dornier Do J flying boat Plus Ultra, which Spanish Air Force Comandante (Commandant Ramón Franco and Capitán (Captain) Julio Ruiz de Alda Miqueleiz were piloting on a transatlantic flight from Spain to Argentina. Plus Ultra took off from Palos de la Frontera, Spain, on 22 January and, after a stop at Gran Canaria in the Canary Islands, landed in the Cape Verde Islands. When the flight resumed, Blas de Lezo and Alsedo escorted the plane for part of its journey. Plus Ultra arrived at Buenos Aires on 26 January, and Blas de Lezo called at Recife, Brazil, from 3 to 7 February 1926. She then headed back to the Cape Verde Islands and then to Tenerife in the Canary Islands. From there, she got back underway on 23 February. She arrived at Cádiz on 6 April 1926 escorting the Argentine Navy protected cruiser Buenos Aires, a training ship which was transporting the four-man crew of Plus Ultra back to a hero's welcome in Spain.

On 20 May 1926 Blas de Lezo left Cartagena and conducted exercises off Mazarrón with Alfonso XIII, Jaime I, Méndez Núñez, Velasco, and the destroyer Lazaga. She put into port at Málaga on 21 May, then proceeded to Al Hoceima. In mid-June 1926, she arrived at Ferrol, where she spent the next two months under repair. On 26 August 1926, she left Ferrol to relieve Méndez Núñez in the Cantabrian Sea, then returned to Ferrol in October 1926.

In 1927, Blas de Lezo was assigned to an international squadron charged with protecting Spanish and other foreign citizens and property in China during unrest there. On 25 January 1927, she left Ferrol bound for Cádiz, where she arrived on 27 January to load supplies. She then made a stop at Ceuta, from which she departed on 28 January for her voyage to China. She headed east across the Mediterranean Sea, passed through the Suez Canal, crossed the Red Sea, Indian Ocean, South China Sea, and East China Sea, and anchored in the Yangtze on 1 March 1927. After completing her operations in China, she got underway on 23 August, stopped at Chinwangtao to recover from an epidemic, then arrived in Japan for a courtesy visit. She left Japan on 8 October and called at Manila in the Philippines from 13 to 19 October. After stops at Singapore, Colombo, Aden, Port Said, and Mahón on Menorca in the Balearic Islands, she returned to Cartagena on 24 November 1927.

In October 1927, King Alfonso XIII signed a royal decree reorganizing the Spanish Navy. In the new organization, Blas de Lezo′s squadron was no longer called the Training Squadron, and Alfonso XIII, Jaime I, and two new light cruisers which were about to enter service, Almirante Cervera and Príncipe Alfonso, were assigned to it. In addition, the decree created a Cruiser Division — composed of Blas de Lezo, Méndez Núñez, and the light cruiser Reina Victoria Eugenia — which was subordinated to the squadron.

=== 1928–1929 ===
Alfonso XIII, Jaime I, Blas de Lezo, Méndez Núñez, and Reina Victoria Eugenia departed Barcelona early on the morning of 1 March 1928 for a voyage to Almería and Málaga. The three light cruisers made a stop at Cádiz, then got back underway on 6 March and steamed north. Blas de Lezo parted company with the other two ships and moored at Lisbon, Portugal, on 7 March because one of her officers had fallen seriously ill. Méndez Núñez and Reina Victoria Eugenia arrived at Marín on 9 March, and Alfonso XIII, Jaime I, and all three light cruisers arrived at Vigo from Marín on 10 March. The five ships conducted gunnery exercises off Marín on 15, 17, and 21 March 1928. The Cruiser Division arrived at Ferrol in late March and at Vigo on 20 April 1928.

In the second week of May 1928, the three light cruisers arrived at Ferrol to have their bottoms cleaned and to undergo repairs. They departed Ferrol on 28 June 1928 headed for Gijón with Príncipe Alfonso, which received her battle ensign there. At San Sebastián on 8 July 1928, they received battle ensigns donated by the province of Gipuzkoa from Queen Victoria Eugenia, as did the Spanish Navy's new training ship, the barquentine Juan Sebastián de Elcano. On 12 July 1928, Blas de Lezo arrived at Bilbao.

In mid-August 1928 the Cruiser Division arrived at Marín, where it rendezvoused with the rest of the squadron (Alfonso XIII, Jamie I, the seaplane carrier Dédalo, and four torpedo boats) for maneuvers. The squadron refueled at Vigo. In September 1928 the squadron arrived in the Mediterranean for general maneuvers, after which Blas de Lezo and Méndez Núñez anchored at Almería on 29 September. During October and November 1928, the squadron conducted general maneuvers in the Balearic Islands and along the Mediterranean coast of Spain, anchoring on 27 October at Palma de Mallorca on Mallorca in the Balearic Islands and at Pollença on Mallorca, from which it proceeded to Barcelona, arriving there on 10 and 11 November 1928. Ships of the squadron began to leave Barcelona on 20 November 1928, and the Cruiser Division arrived ar Ferrol in late November 1928.

On 5 March 1929, Blas de Lezo, Méndez Núñez, Alsedo, Lazaga, and Velasco moored at Cádiz. On the morning of 13 March Blas de Lezo, Méndez Núñez, and Príncipe Alfonso got underway from Vigo for exercises on the open ocean off Galicia during March and April 1929, including numerous gunnery exercises and tactical maneuvers. On 17 May 1929, a Spanish Navy squadron made up of Alfonso XIII, Jaime I, Blas de Lezo, Méndez Núñez, Príncipe Alfonso, Alsedo, Lazaga, Velasco, and the destroyer Sánchez Barcáiztegui arrived at Barcelona for the opening of the 1929 Barcelona International Exposition on 19 May. The squadron remained at Barcelona during the visit there of King Alfonso XIII. The two battleships and three cruisers left Barcelona and anchored at Alcudia on 17 June, later stopping at Palma de Mallorca.

After a stop at Valencia in early July 1929, the same squadron, joined by the Almirante Cervera, arrived at Ferrol on 9 July 1929. After refueling, the four light cruisers departed Ferrol in mid-July 1929 and proceeded to Santander, where King Alfonso XIII and Infante Juan, Count of Barcelona, embarked on Príncipe Alfonso on 20 August 1929. The squadron then put to sea for joint maneuvers.

During the second week of September 1929, Blas e Lezo and Méndez Núñez left Ferrol bound for Cartagena to rendezvous with the squadron for general maneuvers in the Balearic Islands between 20 September and 1 October 1929 in which Alfonso XIII, Jaime I, Dédalo, Blas de Lezo, Almirante Cervera, Méndez Núñez, Príncipe Alfonso, Alsedo, Lazaga, Sánchez Barcáiztegui, Velasco, the protected cruiser Extremadura, seven torpedo boats, the submarine division, and other smaller and auxiliary vessels took part. The squadron began to leave Cartagena on the morning of 17 September 1929. Part of the squadron anchored in Barcelona to rest the crews, refuel, and make repairs. A naval review presided over by King Alfonso XIII took place on 15 October. After the completion of the maneuvers, Alfonso XIII, Jaime I, Blas de Lezo, Méndez Núñez, and the four destroyers returned to Ferrol on 25 October 1929. In December 1929, the Cruiser Division, now composed of Blas de Lezo, Admiral Cervera, and Méndez Núñez, gathered at Cartagena.

=== 1930–1932 ===
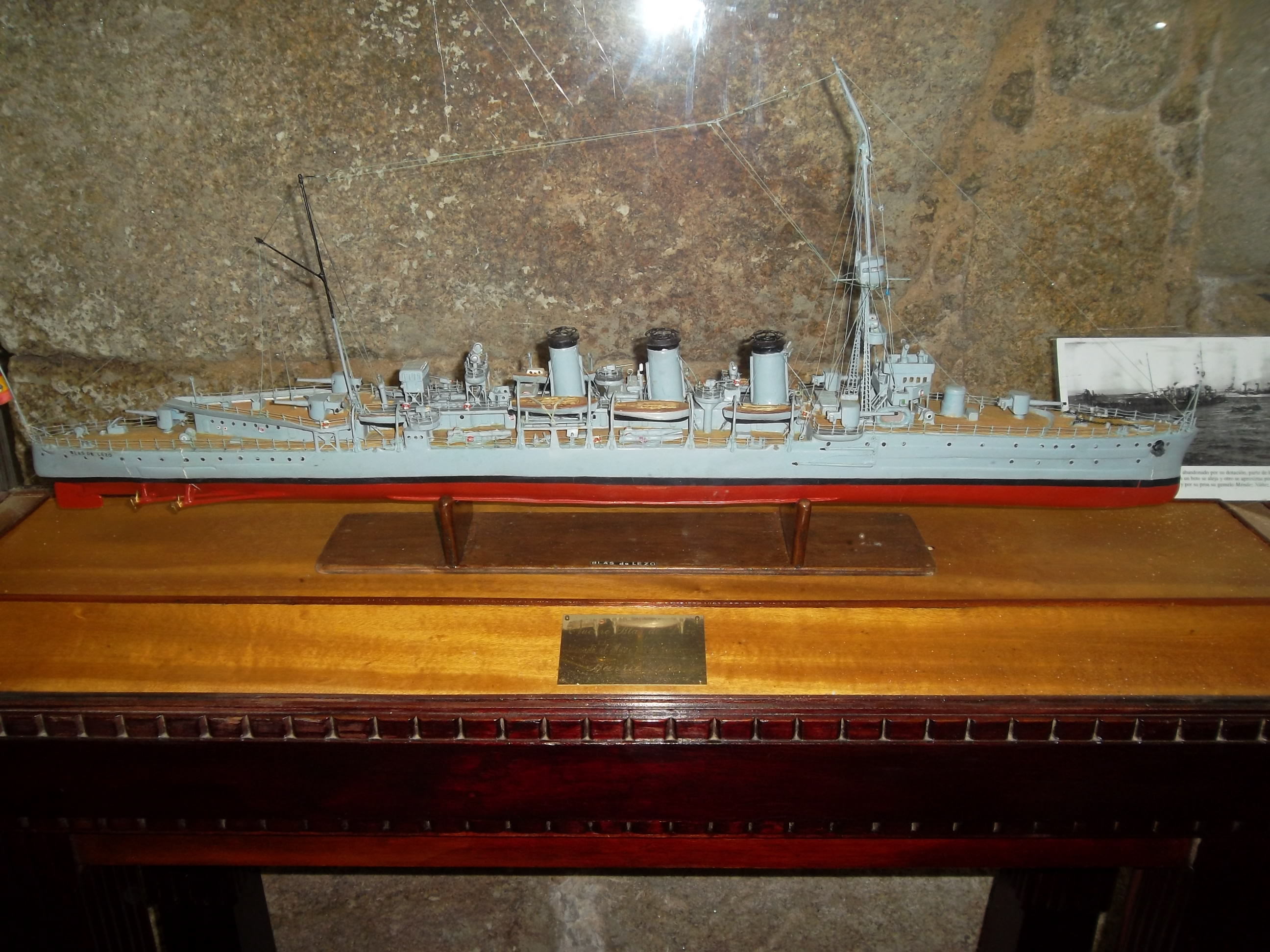
A model of Blas de Lezo at the Ferrol Naval Museum.

In March 1930, the squadron — made up of Alfonso XIII, Jaime I, Blas de Lezo, Admiral Cervera, Méndez Núñez, Prince Alfonso, the light cruiser Miguel de Cervantes, and a squadron of destroyers — rendezvoused at Marín. It carried out naval exercises and then returned to Ferrol.

On the morning of 26 April 1930, Blas de Lezo, Almirante Cervera, and Méndez Núñez and left Vigo bound for the Canary Islands. They arrived at Tenerife on the morning of 29 April to attend a celebration of the 15th-century conquest of the Canary Islands by the Crown of Castile. They then called at Las Palmas, which they reached on 6 May. The three cruisers carried out maneuvers before departing Las Palmas on 12 May bound for Vigo except for Blas de Lezo, which arrived at Cádiz the same day.

The squadron — composed of Alfonso XIII, Jamie I, Blas de Lezo, Almirante Cervera, Méndez Núñez, Príncipe Alfonso, Almirante Ferrándiz, Alsedo, Lazaga, Sánchez Barcáiztegui, Velasco, and the destroyer José Luis Díez — carried out maneuvers in the Pontevedra estuary during the first two weeks of June 1930, returning to Ferrol upon their completion. On 18 July, Blas de Lezo, Almirante Cervera, and Méndez Núñez left Ferrol bound for Santander, where King Alfonso XIII visited them on 21 July 1930.

On 30 August 1930 the Spanish fleet concentrated at Ferrol, bringing together Alfonso XIII, Jamie I, Dédalo (with six seaplanes aboard), Blas de Lezo, Méndez Núñez, Reina Victoria Eugenia, all three Almirante Cervera-class light cruisers, the destroyers Almirante Ferrándiz, Alsedo, José Luis Díez, Lazaga, and Sánchez Barcáiztegui, and submarines. The ships and aircraft conducted maneuvers in the Cantabrian Sea between Cape Ortegal and the Spanish border with France. The maneuvers ended on 20 September 1930 with a parade before King Alfonso XIII. The Spanish fleet arrived at Cádiz on 27 September 1930, then conducted a cruise through the Mediterranean that lasted until December 1930.

From 5 February to 10 June 1931, Blas de Lezo was at the Arsenal de La Carraca in San Fernando for repairs and the installation of searchlights, an electric log, an acoustic echo sounder, and a Hazemeyer firing station. During the first week of August 1931, Blas de Lezo, Almirante Cervera, Libertad (ex-Principe Alfonso), Méndez Núñez, Miguel de Cervantes, República (ex-Reina Victoria Eugenia), eight destroyers, and 10 submarines gathered at Bilbao. In mid-October 1931, Blas de Lezo was back in Cádiz, and she conducted tests in the Bay of Cádiz on 30 October. She left Cádiz on 27 November 1931 to proceed to coast of Galicia. On 29 December 1931, she left Vigo accompanied by two submarines from Ferrol for gunnery practice in the open ocean.

On 4 February 1932, Blas de Lezo, Miguel de Cervantes, and Libertad departed Ferrol bound for Vigo. On 9 May, Blas de Lezo, Almirante Cervera, Libertad, Méndez Núñez, Miguel de Cervantes, and República steamed from Ferrol to La Coruña for an official visit. Leaving the other ships behind at La Coruña, Blas de Lezo, Méndez Núñez, Miguel de Cervantes, and República got underway on 14 May 1932 to proceed to Vigo.

=== Loss ===
In July 1932, Blas de Lezo participated in maneuvers along the coast of Galicia. On 11 July, she took part in the last tactical exercise of the first phase of the maneuvers, in which she, Méndez Núñez, Sánchez Barcáiztegui, and the destroyer Lepanto, designated the "Blue" force, were charged with attacking the Galician coast while the "Red" force, commanded by Contralmirante (Counter Admiral) Álvaro Guitián and composed of the other ships involved in the exercise, attempted to defend it. To approach without being detected by the "Red" force off Cape Nave, the "Blue" force commander, Capitán de navío (Ship-of-the-Line Captain) Joaquín Cervera, decided to steam his ships through the Centollo Pass, a 365-metre (400 yd) wide channel off Cape Finisterre between the Spanish coast and the Centollo Shoal, which lies about 700 metres (770 yd) offshore. The channel is 8 metres (26 ft) deep at low tide and was considered safe for ships with the draft of the light cruisers and destroyers because ships with a deeper draft, such as the armored cruiser Emperador Carlos V, had navigated it safely over the years.

On 11 July 1932, the "Blue" force began its approach and entered the channel in line ahead, with Sánchez Barcáiztegui in the lead, followed in order by Lepanto, Blas de Lezo, and finally Méndez Núñez, with the other three ships ordered to follow Sánchez Barcáiztegui. The two destroyers passed through the channel safely, but at 14:45 Blas de Lezo struck a rock which tore a large gash in her hull, to the astonishment of everyone aboard. She signaled a warning of the danger to Méndez Núñez, which altered course closer to the Centollo Shoal and avoided the rock.

When Blas de Lezo signaled that she had suffered damage, but without reporting its severity, the commander of the "Blue" force ordered all the ships close with her and render assistance. First Sánchez Barcáiztegui towed her briefly until the tow cable broke. Méndez Núñez then attempted a tow, but lacked the appropriate lines for it. Lepanto next tried to tow Blas de Lezo, but the destroyer Alcalá Galiana, which on her own initiative had arrived from the "Red" force, inadvertently interfered with Lepanto while making an uncoordinated attempt of her own to assist Blas de Lezo. The Spanish ships then awaited the eventual arrival of the Spanish tug Argos, which managed to begin a tow, but it soon became apparent that Blas de Leo could not reach safety, and the other ships on the scene took off all 346 members of her crew without loss of life. Blas de Lezo sank five to six hours after striking the rock and about 5 kilometres (2.7 nmi; 3.1 mi) from the point of impact. After Almirante Cervera, Méndez Núñez, and Miguel de Cervantes arrived at Ferrol on 18 July, Méndez Núñez entered dry dock for an inspection of her hull to see if she had suffered any damage in the incident.

A court martial of the commanding officer of Blas de Lezo was ordered on 5 December 1932. He was acquitted of wrongdoing on 4 March 1933 after the court determined that the rock Blas de Lezo struck did not appear on her navigation charts, which were Spanish charts copied from older British ones made using manual sounding techniques. A subsequent hydrographic survey found two previously undiscovered needle-like rock spires in the channel that rose to a depth of 5.1 metres (17 ft) and 5.2 to 5.4 metres (17 to 18 ft), one of which Blas de Lezo must have struck. Previous surveys had missed them because the manual sounding equipment of the time had difficulty in detecting and charting narrow, isolated submerged rock formations, either missing them entirely or sliding down their sides without registering their true depth.

Also tried at the court martial were the overall commanders of the "Red" and "Blue" forces, Guitián and Cervera, criticized for choosing the route through the Centollo Pass, failing to better coordinate attempts to assist Blas de Lezo, not using two ships to tow the stricken cruiser when it became obvious that no one ship present could manage a successful tow, and for dooming the cruiser by waiting too long for Argos to arrive on the scene. Guitián noted that he had requested the assignment of a more powerful tug to support the exercise when he submitted his plan for the maneuvers on 15 March 1932 to the Ministry of the Navy and that such a tug might have saved Blas de Lezo if it had been available. Guitián also was criticized for not proceeding to the scene of the incident to direct operations in person. Guitián and Cervera also were acquitted on 4 March 1933 on the grounds that the Centollo Pass had been considered safe before the Blas de Lezo incident for ships of her draft, that such navigational challenges were necessary during exercises to ensure the Spanish Navy's readiness, and that there was no evidence that Blas de Lezo could have been saved even if assistance had been better coordinated and more aggressive and even if Guitián had been on he scene in person.

== Wreck ==
Although local fishermen knew of the location of the wreck of Blas de Lezo for years, its identity was not confirmed until three Spanish divers discovered it in 2004. It lies about 5 nautical miles (9.3 km; 5.8 mi) north of the wreck of the Spanish Navy armored cruiser Cardenal Cisneros, which had sunk in 1905 and which the same trio of divers discovered in 2006. It lies about 5 nautical miles (9.3 km; 5.8 mi) offshore and sits upright on an even keel in 76 metres (249 ft) of water, with the top of the hull at a depth of 60 metres (197 ft) and the top of the mast at a depth of 30 metres (98 ft). The hull is largely intact, but the decks have collapsed into it, creating a tangle of wreckage within the hull, although most of Blas de Lezo′s defining features remain discernible.

The wreck has been visited several times since its 2004 discovery. Extensive film footage of it — collected for the Spanish television series Buscadores de naufraxios (English: Shipwreck Hunters), which is dedicated to the wrecks of important vessels accessible to the Spanish coast — became available.
