= Spanish cruiser Navarra (1923) =

Spanish Navy light cruiser of 1923–1956

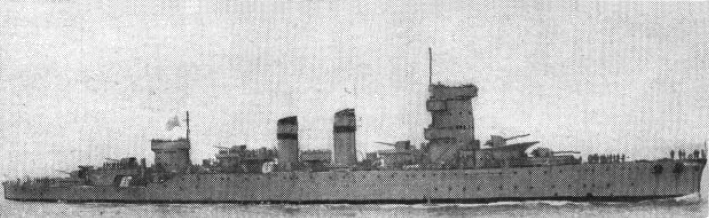
- Navarra after 1936 refit

History

Spain
- Name: Reina Victoria Eugenia (1915-1931); República (1931-1936); Navarra (1936-1956)
- Builder: SCNE, Ferrol
- Laid down: 31 March 1915
- Launched: 21 April 1920
- Completed: 15 January 1923
- Stricken: 1956
- Nickname(s): Sigamos a la flota
- Fate: Retired in 1956

General characteristics
- Class & type: Navarra-class light cruiser
- Displacement: 5,502 long tons (5,590 t) standard; 6,348 long tons (6,450 t) full load
- Length: 462 ft (141 m)
- Beam: 50 ft (15 m)
- Draught: 15 ft 9 in (4.80 m)
- Propulsion: 2 shafts, Parsons Type geared turbines, 12 Yarrow Type boilers, 25,500 hp
- Speed: 25.5 knots (47.2 km/h)
- Range: 4,500 nmi (8,300 km) at 15 kn (28 km/h)
- Complement: 404
- Armament: As built; 9 × 152 mm (6.0 in) Vickers-Carraca guns in single mountings; 4 × 47 mm (1.9 in) guns; 4 × 21-inch (533 mm) torpedo tubes (2x2) above water; After refit; 6 × 152 mm (6.0 in) Vickers-Carraca guns in single mountings; 4 × 88 mm (3.5 in) Flak 18 guns; 2 × 40 mm (1.6 in) 2-pdr pom-pom guns; 4 × machine guns
- Armour: 3 - 2 inch belt, 3 inch deck, 6 inch conning tower

Navarra was a light cruiser serving the Spanish Navy from 1923 to 1956. Construction of Reina Victoria Eugenia—the ship's original name—began in 1915 by Sociedad Española de Construcción Naval in Ferrol. The design showed considerable British design influence resembling contemporary British Town-class cruisers. The boilers were re-arranged into three rooms to give three funnels. The ship was renamed República in 1931 and assumed the name Navarra in 1936.

== Service ==
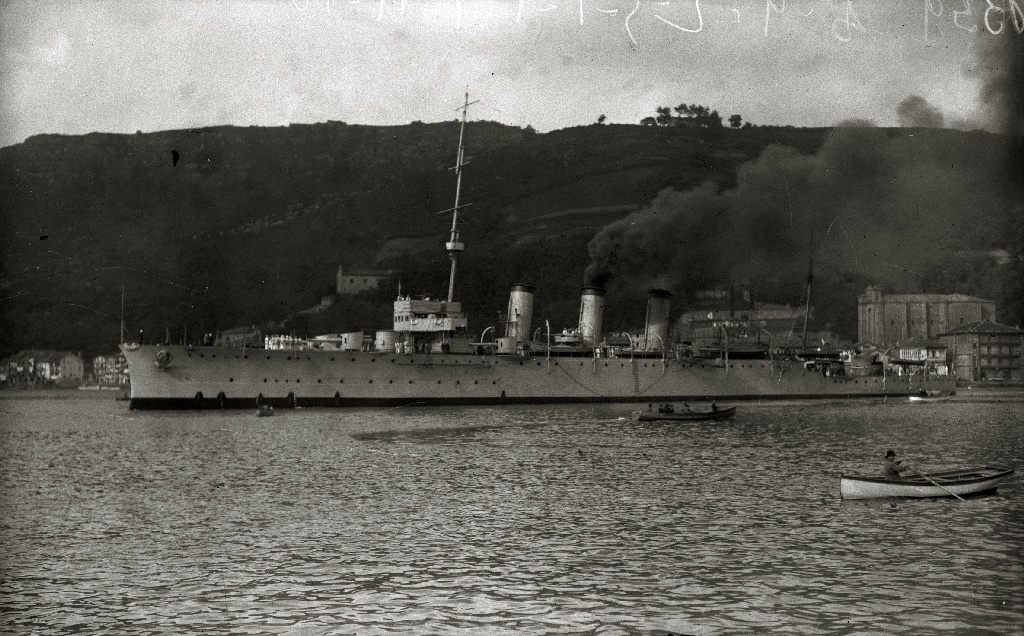
Reina Victoria Eugenia, 1924.

The ship was ordered as the Reina Victoria Eugenia (named after Queen consort Victoria Eugenie of Battenberg), laid down on 31 March 1915, launched 21 April 1920 and completed on 15 January 1923. She was flagship of the Spanish squadron during the Rif war. After the proclamation of the Second Spanish Republic in 1931 she became part of the Spanish Republican Navy and was renamed República.

At the start of the Spanish Civil War in 1936, she was being refitted in Cádiz and was seized by the Nationalist side. The refit included replacing the old coal-fired boilers with oil-fired units. A new superstructure was added, one funnel was removed, and six 6-inch guns were moved to the centre line (three guns were removed). Four German 88 mm AA guns were also fitted, and the torpedo tubes removed.

The ship had limited war service and later was used as a training ship until her retirement in 1956. When in service during the last months of the Spanish Civil War, Navarra was nicknamed Sigamos a la flota ("Follow the fleet"), after the Fred Astaire and Ginger Rogers film, because it was much slower than the two other surviving Nationalist cruisers (Canarias and Almirante Cervera).

== Bibliography ==
- Chesneau, Roger, ed. (1980). Conway's All the World's Fighting Ships 1922–1946. New York: Mayflower Books. ISBN 0-8317-0303-2.
- Whitley, M. J. (1995). Cruisers of World War Two: An International Encyclopedia. London: Cassell. ISBN 1-86019-874-0.
