= Blas de Lezo-class cruiser =

Spanish cruiser class

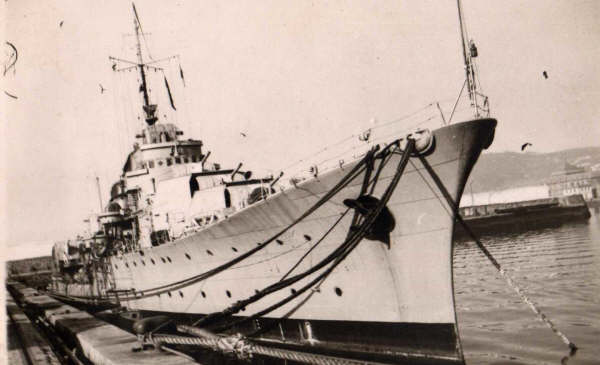
- Méndez Núñez after her 1944 refit

Class overview
- Name: Blas de Lezo class
- Builders: Sociedad Española de Construcción Naval, Ferrol
- Operators: Spanish Navy
- Preceded by: Navarra
- Succeeded by: Almirante Cervera-class cruiser
- In commission: 1924–1963
- Completed: 2
- Lost: 1
- Retired: 1

General characteristics
- Displacement: 4,780 long tons (4,860 t) standard; 6,230 long tons (6,330 t) full load
- Length: 462 ft (141 m)
- Beam: 46 ft (14 m)
- Draught: 14 ft 4 in (4.37 m)
- Propulsion: 4 shafts, Parsons Type geared turbines, 12 Yarrow Type boilers, 45,000 hp
- Speed: 29 knots (54 km/h)
- Range: 5,000 nmi (9,300 km) at 13 kn (24 km/h)
- Complement: 320
- Armament: As built: 6 × 152 mm (6 in) guns in single mounts; 4 ×47 mm (1.9 in); Added 1930: 12 × 533 mm (21 in) torpedoes in four triple mounts; Méndez Núñez 1944: 8 x 120 mm (4.7 in) guns in single mounts; 8 x 37 mm in four twin mounts; 8 x 20mm guns in two quad mounts; 6 × 533 mm (21 in) torpedoes in two triple mounts
- Armour: 50–75 mm (2–3 in) belt; 25 mm (1 in) deck; 152 mm (6 in) conning tower

The Blas de Lezo-class cruisers were a group of two cruisers, built for the Spanish Navy in the 1920s. The ships were ordered in 1915 but construction proceeded slowly due to material shortages during World War I. The ships were built by Sociedad Española de Construcción Naval in Ferrol and showed considerable British design influence, resembling contemporary British C-class cruisers.

== Characteristics ==
The Blas de Lezo class ships were ordered as "fast cruisers" inspired by the design of the British C-class light cruisers. They were slower than the C-class, however, which in service proved to be their main limitation as combat ships, and they were reclassified as light cruisers as a result.

The ships were 134.11 metres (440 ft 0 in) long between perpendiculars and 140.82 metres (462 ft 0 in) long overall. They had a beam of 14.02 metres (46 ft 0 in), a maximum draft of 5.6 metres (18 ft 4 in), and a height of 7.72 metres (25 ft 4 in). Their normal displacement was 4,780 tons, and they displaced 6,045 tons at full load.

The ships were armed with six Vickers 152-millimetre (6 in) guns in single mounts, two forward, two aft, one on either side amidships, as well as four 47-millimetre (1.9 in) anti-aircraft guns located along the sides between the funnels. In 1930, twelve 533-millimetre (21 in) torpedo tubes of in four triple mounts were installed.

The propulsion system consisted of four sets of Parsons turbines, six coal-fired Yarrow boilers, six oil-fired Yarrow boilers, which generated 43,000 horsepower (32,065 kW) and drove four propellers. The ships had a maximum speed of 29 knots (54 km/h; 33 mph). The fuel capacity was 730 tons of oil and 800 tons of coal, giving the ships a range of 5,000 nautical miles (9,300 km; 5,800 mi) at an economical cruising speed of 13 knots (24 km/h; 15 mph).

The ships were armored, with 50 to 75 millimetres (2.0 to 3.0 in) of belt armor, 25 millimetres (0.98 in) of deck armor, and a conning tower with 152 millimetres (6 in) of armor. Each ship had a crew of 320 men.

== Naming ==
Originally, the lead ship of the class was laid down with the name Blas de Lezo, thus giving the class as a whole this name, while the second ship received the name Méndez Núñez. However, by an order of May 1924, the ships swapped names so that the first ship, commissioned in 1924, could bear the name Méndez Núñez to honor the centenary of the birth of Contralmirante (Counter Admiral) Casto Méndez Núñez that year. Thus, the ship laid down in 1915 as Blas de Lezo was commissioned as Méndez Núñez in 1924, while the ship laid down in 1920 as Méndez Núñez was commissioned as Blas de Lezo in 1925.

== Ships ==
Ship	Laid down	Launched	Commissioned	Fate
Méndez Núñez (ex-Blas de Lezo)	May 1915	27 July 1922	1924	Stricken 1963
Blas de Lezo (ex-Méndez Núñez)	1920	3 March 1923	March 1925	Sank 11 July 1932

=== Blas de Lezo ===
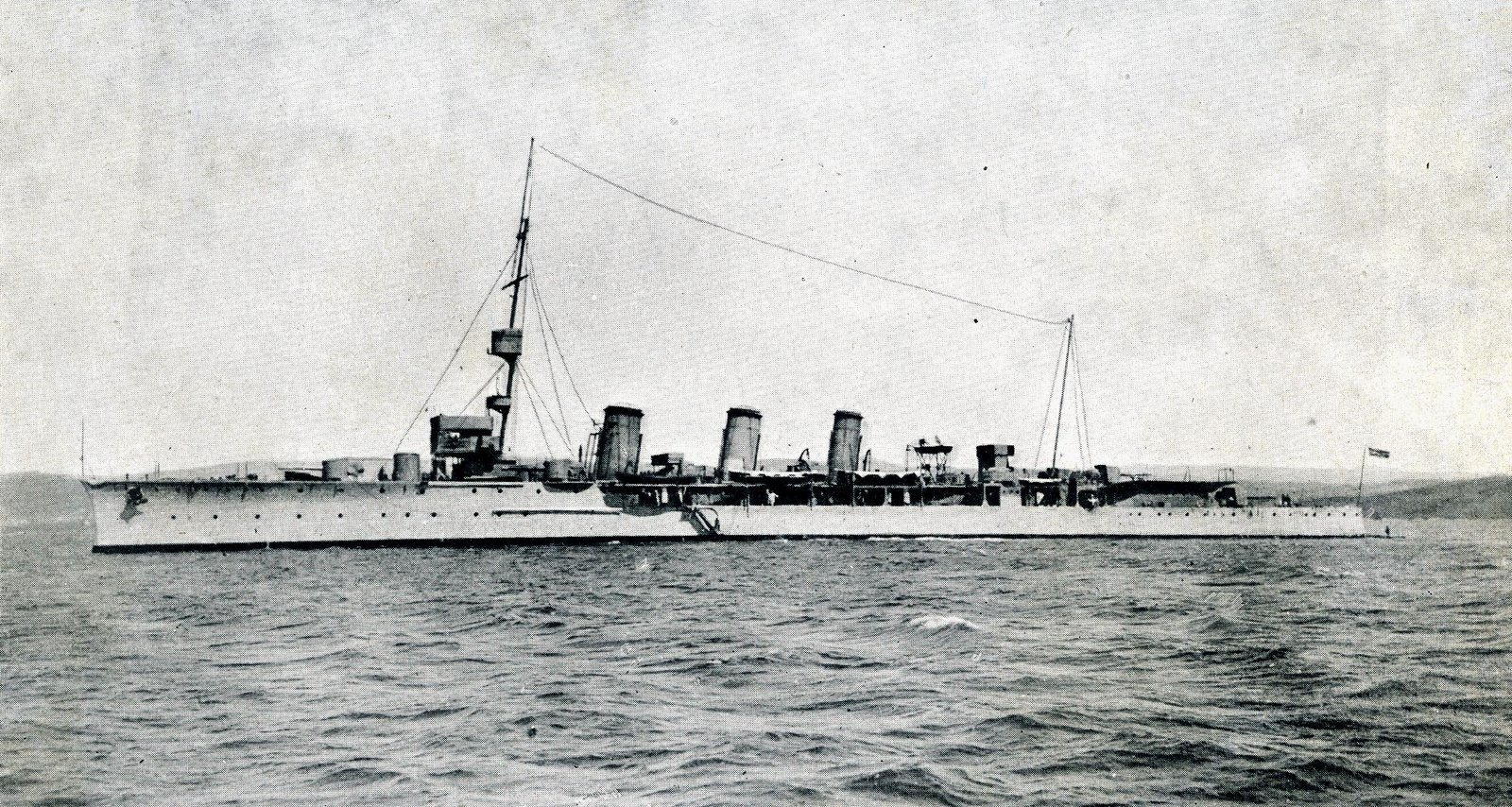
Blas de Lezo during shakedown in 1923.

Profile of Blas de Lezo as she appeared in 1932.

Blas de Lezo was named after Admiral Blas de Lezo. In early 1926, she supported the transatlantic flight from Spain to Buenos Aires, Argentina, of a four-man Spanish Air Force crew led by pilot Major Ramón Franco – the brother of future Spanish caudillo Francisco Franco – and including copilot/navigator Captain Julio Ruiz de Alda Miqueleiz in the Dornier Do J Wal ("Whale") flying boat Plus Ultra ("Farther Still"), carrying spares and other equipment for the flight. She struck a rock near Cape Finisterre in 1932 and sank in deep water.

=== Méndez Núñez ===
Profile of Méndez Núñez as she appeared in 1932

Profile of Méndez Núñez as she appeared in 1950

Méndez Núñez was named after Admiral Casto Méndez Núñez. She was based in Equatorial Guinea at the start of the Spanish Civil War and she returned home to fight for the Spanish Republican Navy. In 1939, following the Cartagena Uprising, she was interned in Bizerte and seized by the French authorities. She was later handed over to Francoist Spain.

Méndez Núñez was reconstructed into an anti-aircraft cruiser in 1944, rearmed with eight 120-millimetre (4.7 in) Vickers anti-aircraft guns in single mounts, eight 37 mm guns of German origin in four twin mounts, and eight 20mm light anti-aircraft guns of German origin in two quadruple mounts. The superstructure was completely rebuilt and fitted with modern fire-control equipment. Two triple banks of torpedo tubes were retained. Méndez Núñez served until 1963.

== Bibliography ==
- Chesneau, Roger, ed. (1980). Conway's All the World's Fighting Ships 1922–1946. New York: Mayflower Books. ISBN 0-8317-0303-2.
- Whitley, M. J. (1995). Cruisers of World War Two: An International Encyclopedia. London: Cassell. ISBN 1-86019-874-0.
