= Blas de Lezo =

Spanish admiral

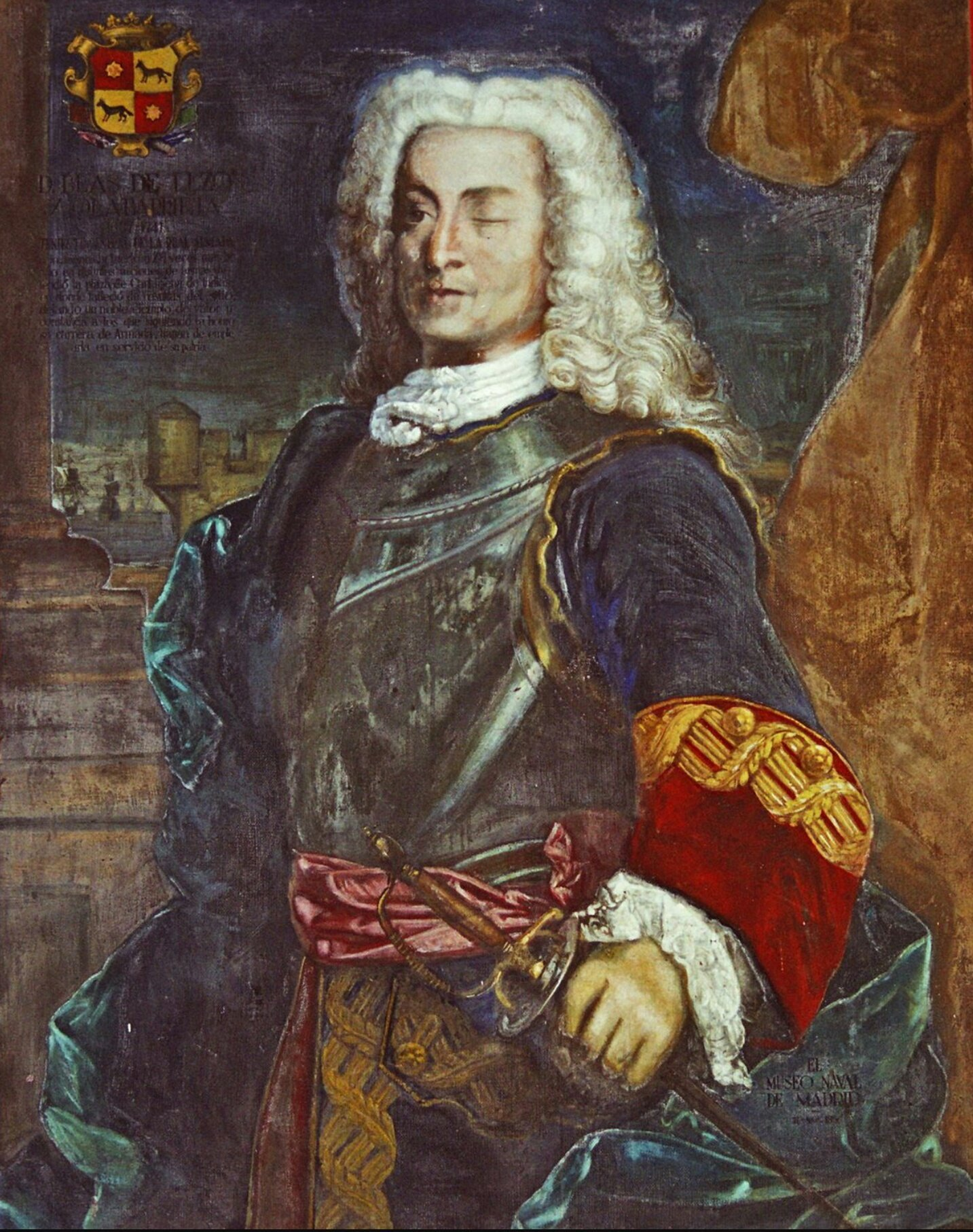
- Portrait of Lezo, Museo Naval de Madrid
- Born: Blas de Lezo y Olavarrieta; February 3, 1689; Pasajes, Guipúzcoa, Spain
- Died: September 7, 1741 (aged 52); Cartagena de Indias, New Granada
- Military career
- Allegiance: Kingdom of Spain
- Branch: Royal Spanish Navy
- Service years: 1704–1741
- Rank: Admiral
- Conflicts: War of the Spanish Succession; Battle of Málaga; First Siege of Barcelona; Battle of Toulon; Second Siege of Barcelona; Spanish-Algerian War; Spanish conquest of Oran; War of the Austrian Succession; War of Jenkins' Ear; Battle of Cartagena de Indias

Admiral Blas de Lezo y Olavarrieta (3 February 1689 – 7 September 1741) was a Spanish Navy officer best known for his victory at the 1741 Battle of Cartagena de Indias, where forces under his command defeated a large British invasion force under Admiral Edward Vernon.

Throughout his naval career, Lezo sustained many severe wounds; he lost his left eye, complete mobility of the right arm, and had his left leg amputated in situ after being hit by the projectile of a cannon. He perceived his wounds and physical limitations as medals, refusing to wear an eye patch to hide his blind eye. Wearing his past battles’ history on his flesh won the respect of his peers and soldiers. Lezo used to say that the lack of a leg does not imply the lack of a brave heart. It is said that he sometimes recalled famous Dutch admiral Cornelis Jol, called "pegleg" because of his wooden prosthesis, as an example of a sailor who undertook great enterprises and achieved great renown, especially in piracy and privateering, despite his theoretical disability.

Lezo's defence of Cartagena de Indias against Vernon's vastly larger force consolidated his legacy as one of the most prominent military commanders in naval history and in the history of Spain. He is often recognized as one of Spain's finest naval officers.

== Biography ==
=== Family background and early life ===
Blas de Lezo y Olavarrieta, son of Pedro de Lezo y Urrecho and Agustina de Olavarrieta y Arnao, was born on 3 February 1689 in Pasajes de San Pedro (then a district of San Sebastián, now part of Pasajes in the Basque Province of Gipuzkoa, Spain), a coastal town deeply tied to maritime trade and seafaring. He was baptized on 9 February 1689 in the Church of San Pedro Mártir. Both his parents were from minor nobility with a maritime tradition. Blas was the third of eight children, many of whom did not survive infancy.

=== Early missions and injuries ===
Blas de Lezo y Olavarrieta attended school in France and commenced his naval career in the Franco-Spanish fleets, then united by the Bourbon alliance of the War of Spanish Succession, in 1701 as a midshipman. In 1704, he fought in the War of the Spanish Succession as a crew member in the Franco-Spanish fleet against the combined forces of Great Britain and the Netherlands at the indecisive Battle of Vélez-Málaga. During the battle, his left leg was hit by cannon-shot and was amputated under the knee. Promoted to ensign, de Lezo was present at the relief of Peñíscola, Spain, and Palermo in Sicily; his service in these and other actions resulted in his promotion to ship lieutenant. Participating in the 1707 defence of the French naval base of Toulon cost him his left eye. In 1711 he served in the Spanish Navy under the orders of Andrés de Pez. In 1713 he was promoted to captain. In 1714 he lost use of his right arm in the Siege of Barcelona. Later in this campaign, his ship captured the Stanhope commanded by John Combes, sometimes claimed to be a 70-gun but actually just a 20-gun merchantman.

Thus, by age 25, depending on the sources, de Lezo had lost his left eye, his left leg below the knee, and the use of his right arm. Modern sources often focus on these salient features and refer to de Lezo with nicknames such as "Patapalo" (Pegleg) and "Mediohombre" (Half-man). There is no contemporary proof that these (or others) were actually used during de Lezo's lifetime.

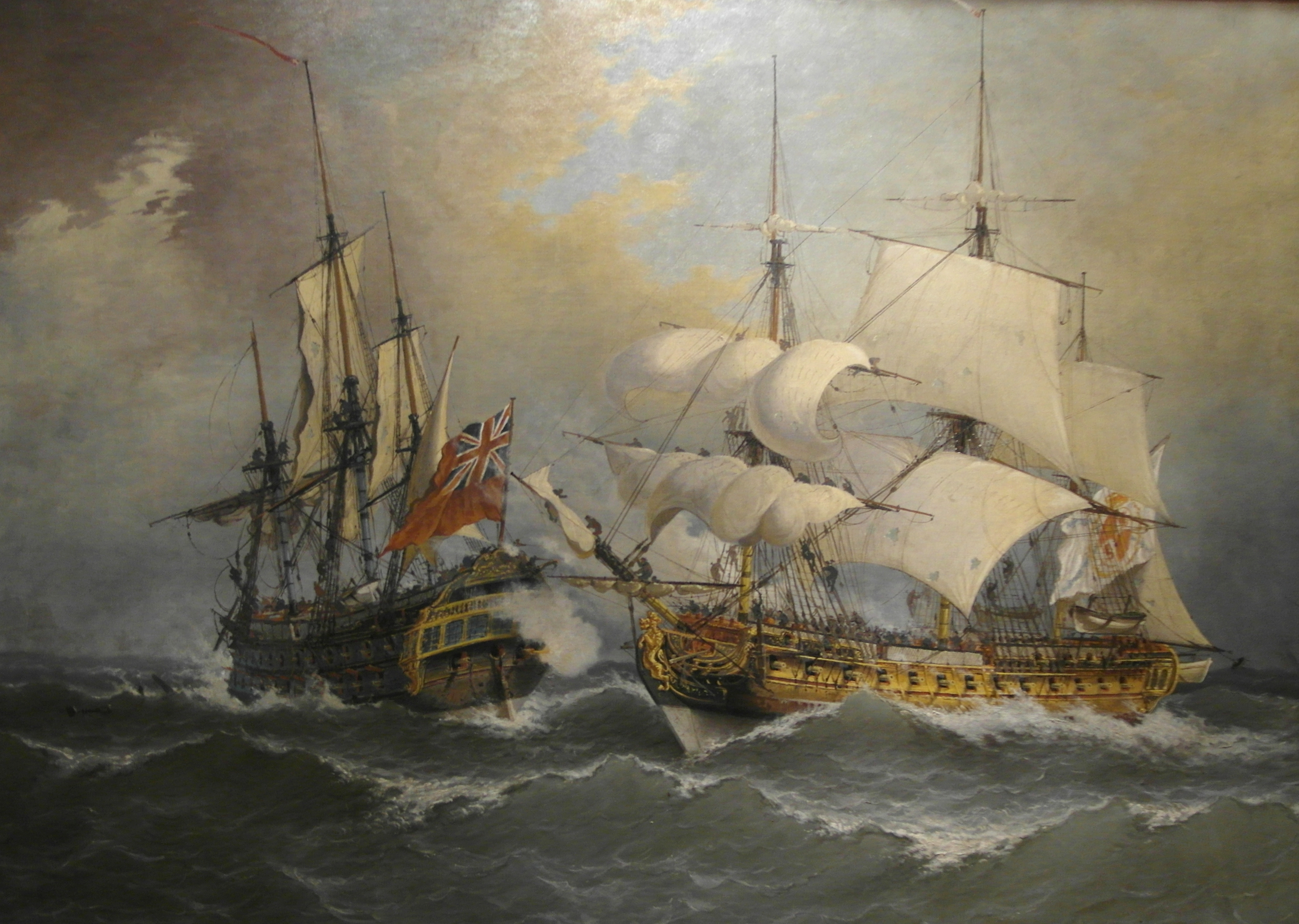
A 19th-century depiction of Blas de Lezo's frigate towing its prize, the Stanhope (ca. 1710)

=== First posting to the Americas ===
De Lezo served in the Pacific in 1720–1728. Although it has been claimed that he took many prizes during this period, documentary evidence indicates that he captured just two French frigates and not in the Pacific but in the Atlantic. He reached Callao in the Viceroyalty of Peru with them in January 1720, although he had left Spain in 1716 as second-in-command of the Nuestra Señora del Carmen or Lanfranco as part of the expedition commanded by Juan Nicolás de Martinet (he separated from the expedition while sailing past Cape Horn). The prizes attributed to de Lezo were actually taken by Martinet, who reached Callao in June 1717 and left the Pacific in 1719 before de Lezo's arrival. de Lezo married in Peru in 1725.

=== Return to the Mediterranean ===
In 1730 he returned to Spain and was promoted to chief of the Mediterranean Fleet; with this force he went to the Republic of Genoa to enforce the payment of two million pesos owed to Spain that had been retained in the Bank of Saint George. Deeming the honor of the Spanish flag to be at stake, de Lezo threatened the city with bombardment.

In 1732, on board the Santiago, he and José Carrillo de Albornoz commanded the enormous expedition to Oran and Mers-el-Kébir with more than 300 ships and around 28,000 troops, comprising infantry, cavalry and artillery. In the Battle of Aïn-el-Turk they recaptured the cities lost to the Ottoman Empire in 1708. After the defeat, Bey Abu l-Hasan Ali I managed to reunite his troops and surrounded the city of Oran. De Lezo returned to its aid with six ships and 5,000 men and managed to drive off the Algerian pirate after a difficult fight. Dissatisfied with this, de Lezo took his 60-gun flagship into the corsair's refuge of Mostaganem Bay, a bastion defended by two forts and 4,000 Moors, inflicting heavy damage on the forts and town. In the following months he established a naval blockade, preventing the Algerians from receiving reinforcements from Istanbul and thereby gaining valuable time for the securing of Oran's defense, until an epidemic forced him to return to Cádiz.

=== General Commander and Battle of Cartagena de Indias ===
In 1734 de Lezo was promoted by the king to Lieutenant General of the Navy. He returned to South America with the ships Fuerte and Conquistador in 1737 as General Commander of the Spanish fleet stationed at Cartagena de Indias, in modern-day Colombia. He took up his new post just prior to the conflict between Great Britain and Spain that would become known as the War of Jenkins' Ear and that would later be subsumed into the War of Austrian Succession.

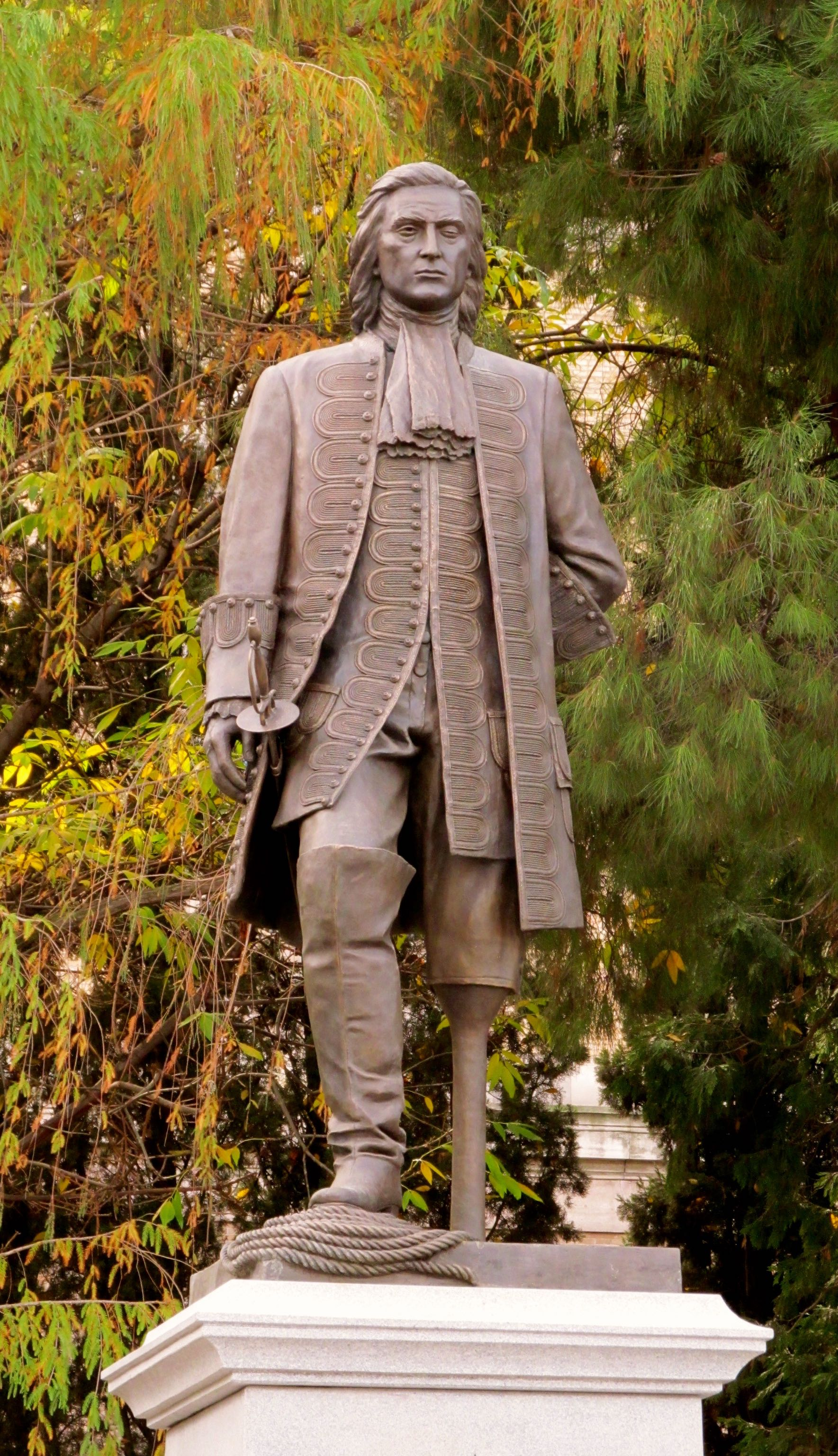
Monument to de Lezo in Columbus Square, Madrid

In the early stages of the conflict, the British Admiral Edward Vernon undertook attacks on various Spanish outposts in America. One such attack involved the capture of Portobelo (Panama), the dismantling of its fortifications and the subsequent withdrawal of British forces having left the place defenceless.

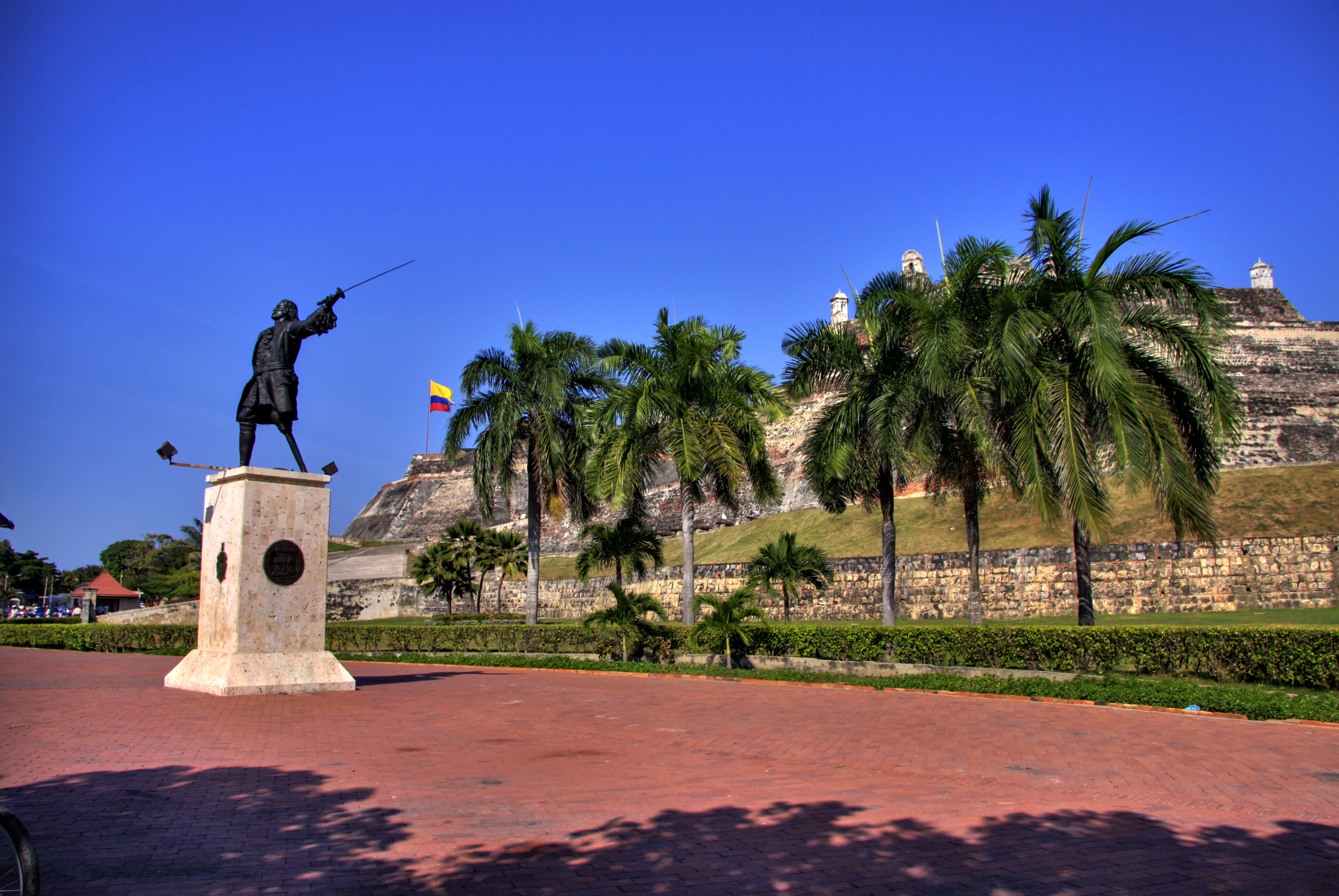
Statue of Blas de Lezo in Cartagena de Indias, Colombia

Admiral Vernon tested Cartagena de Indias on three separate occasions. Both Vernon and Edward Trelawny, the British governor of Jamaica, considered the Spanish gold shipping port to be a prime objective. The first attempt, in March 1740, was essentially a reconnaissance in force by a squadron including ships of the line, two fire ships, three bomb vessels, and transport ships. Vernon's intention was to gather information on the city's topography and troop strength and to provoke a response that might give him a better idea of the defensive capabilities of the Spanish.

In May, Vernon returned to Cartagena de Indias in charge of 13 warships, with the intention of probing the city's defences.

The actual attack on Cartagena de Indias took place March 13 through May 20, 1741. The British concentrated a fleet consisting of 196 ships, including 2,620 artillery pieces and more. There were 10,000 soldiers, 12,600 sailors, 1,000 Jamaican slaves (employed as pioneers) and 4,000 recruits from Virginia. The defences of Cartagena de Indias comprised between 3,000 and 6,000 combatants, including regular troops, militia, and native archers, and six Spanish ships of the line and their crews. Blas de Lezo's advantages consisted of a formidable primary fortress and numerous secondary fortifications.

On the evening of April 19, the British mounted an assault in force upon San Felipe. Three columns of grenadiers supported by Jamaicans and several British companies moved under cover of darkness, with the aid of an intense naval bombardment. The British fought their way to the base of the fort's ramparts but were unable to overcome de Lezo's defence. They withdrew to Jamaica in late May with substantial casualties from both combat and disease.

Following the news of the disaster, Robert Walpole's government soon collapsed. Spain retained control over its most strategically important colonies in the Americas, including the vitally crucial port of Cartagena de Indias that helped secure the defense of the Spanish Main and its trans-Atlantic trade with Spain.

News of Britain's defeat reached Europe at the end of June 1741 and had immense repercussions. It caused George II of Great Britain, who had been acting as mediator between Frederick the Great of Prussia and Maria Theresa supporting Austria over Prussian seizure of Silesia in December 1740, to withdraw Britain's guarantees of armed support for the Pragmatic Sanction. That encouraged France and Spain, the Bourbon allies, revealed to also be allied with Prussia, to move militarily against a now isolated Austria. A war of wider scope, the War of the Austrian Succession, now began.

=== Death ===
Blas de Lezo died four months after the battle of Cartagena de Indias and a contemporary source indicates that his cause of death was epidemic typhus: "unas calenturas, que en breves días se le declaró tabardillo". The site of his grave is unknown.

He was later honoured for his part in the siege of Cartagena de Indias; a square and an avenue in the modern city of Cartagena are named after him. A modern statue stands in front of the Castillo San Felipe de Barajas. In 2011, during a conference on Blas de Lezo's place in history and honouring the 270th anniversary of Cartagena de Indias' defence, a plaque was placed on the wall at the Plaza de los Coches, by the Clock Tower portal. In November 2014, a 35,000 kilo statue of de Lezo was erected in Madrid's Plaza Colón.

== Legacy ==
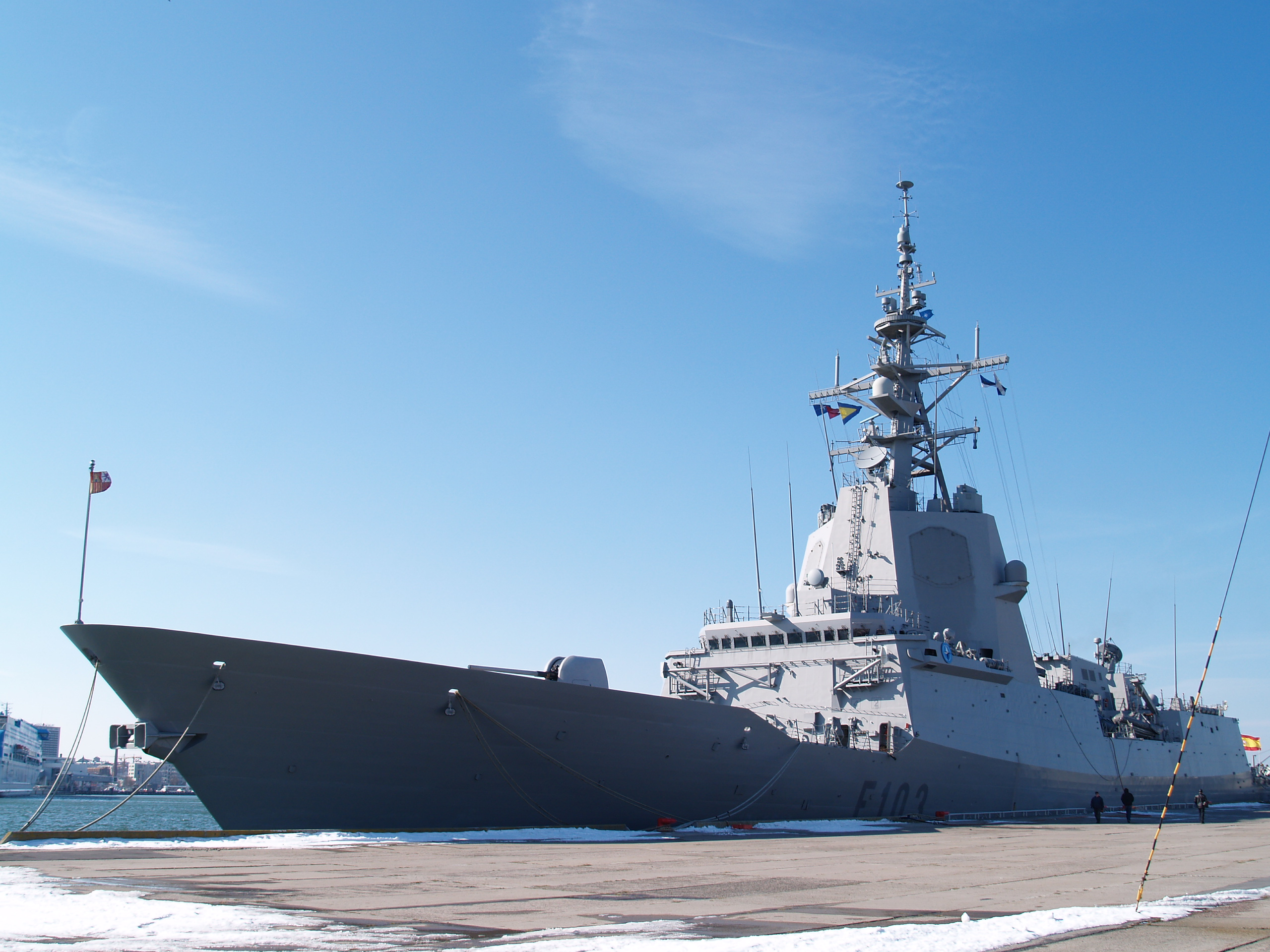
Blas de Lezo (F-103) in Tallinn, Estonia

Several Spanish warships have been named Blas de Lezo in his honour, including:

- General Lezo, a paddle gunboat acquired in 1852 and decommissioned in 1868.
- General Lezo, an Elcano-class screw gunboat commissioned in 1885 and sunk in 1898.
- Blas de Lezo, a Blas de Lezo-class light cruiser commissioned in 1925 that sank in 1932.
- Blas de Lezo, the former Gearing-class destroyer USS Noa (DD-841), in Spanish Navy service as a Churruca-class destroyer from 1973 to 1991.
- Blas de Lezo (F103), an Álvaro de Bazán-class frigate commissioned in December 2004.

The Colombian Navy also had a ship named after Blas de Lezo:

- ARC Blas de Lezo (BT-62), acquired: 26 November 1947, Struck: January 1965. This ship was the former USS Kalamazoo (AOG-30), a Mettawee-class gasoline tanker.

In 2013, the Naval Museum of Madrid organised an exhibition on Blas de Lezo, including portraits, uniforms and layouts of battle plans.

In 2016, members of Spanish internet troll forum ForoCoches promoted Blas de Lezo's name in an online poll organized by Natural Environment Research Council (NERC) for the christening of a British research vessel, putting forward his "contribution to British underwater archeology". The NERC removed the option, which had gathered more than 38,000 votes at that point.

== Recent publications ==
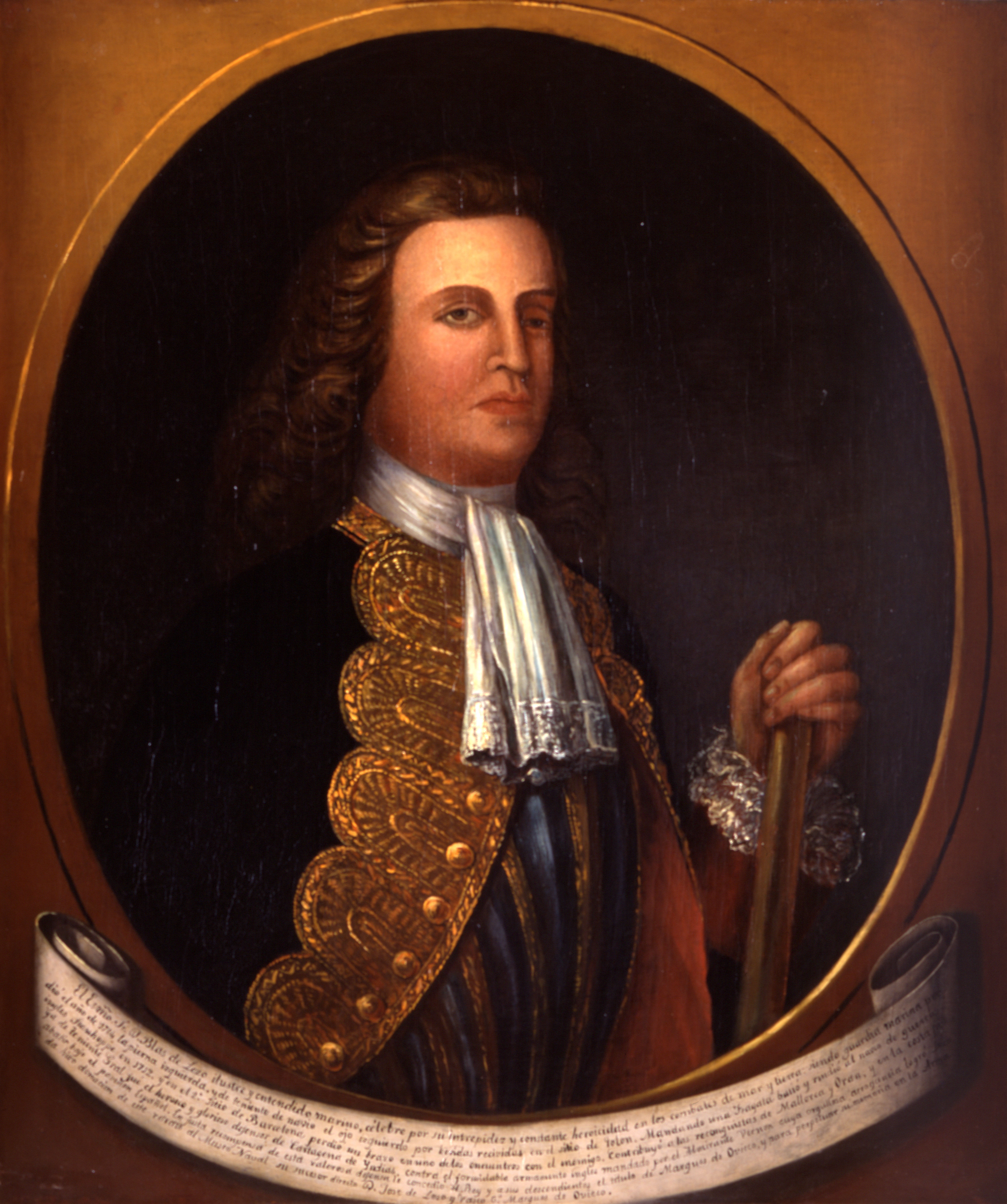
Unknown oil on canvas of Blas de Lezo

Francisco Hernando Muñoz Atuesta, compiler of "Diarios de ofensa y defensa" has shown that it has "traditionally been affirmed that the English King forbade any writing on the failure of his armed forces at Cartagena de Indias, which is absolutely false". There was a spate of impressionistic and highly inaccurate novels following the publication by the Colombian historian Pablo Victoria of his fictional biography of Lezo:

- Francisco Hernando Muñoz Atuesta (2015), Diarios de Ofensa y Defensa. Ataque inglés sobre Cartagena de Indias (Diaries of Offense and Defense. English attack on Cartagena de Indias). Ediciones Genealogía e Historia. Bogotá. Colombia.
- Carlos Alonso Mendizábal (2008), Blas de Lezo, el malquerido ("Blas de Lezo, the unloved one"), Dossoles, Burgos.
- Ramiro Ribas Narváez (2009), La conjura de la mentira. Derrota de Inglaterra en Cartagena de Indias ("Conspiracy of lies: the defeat of England at Cartagena de Indias"), Akrón.
- Alber Vázquez (2010), Mediohombre. La batalla que Inglaterra ocultó al mundo ("Half-man: the battle that England hid from the world"), Inédita Editores.
- Felipe Blasco Patiño (2010), El hombre sin rey. ¿Pudo un solo hombre cambiar el destino de América? El desastre de la Armada Invencible inglesa ("The man without a king: could one man change the fate of America? The 'invincible' English fleet meets disaster"), Bohodón Ediciones, Madrid.
- Santiago Iglesias de Paúl (2011), El marino que cazaba lagartos... y que luchó junto a Blas de Lezo ("The sailor who hunted lizards... and fought alongside Blas de Lezo"), JM Ediciones.
- Orlando Name Bayona (2012), Blas de Lezo. El almirante patapalo. ¡Anka Motz! ("Blas de Lezo: the pegleg admiral"), Oveja negra.
- Juan Antonio Pérez-Foncea (2012), El héroe del Caribe. La última batalla de Blas de Lezo ("The Caribbean hero: Blas de Lezo's last battle"), Libroslibres.
- José Vicente Pascual (2013), Almirante en tierra firme. La aventura de Blas de Lezo, el español que derrotó a Inglaterra ("Admiral on dry land: the adventures of Blas de Lezo, the Spaniard who defeated England"), Áltera, Madrid.
- Francisco Javier Romero Valentín (2013), El paisano de Jamaica ("The Jamaican compatriot"), Amazon Media.
- David López (2013), El aventurero Vivar ("Vivar the adventurer"), Rocaeditorial.
- Víctor San Juan (2014), Morirás por Cartagena ("You shall die for Cartagena"), Punto de Vista Editores.
- Rafael Vidal & José Pablo García (2014), Blas de Lezo. El marino invicto ("Blas de Lezo: the undefeated sailor").
- Pablo Victoria (2014), Los amores prohibidos de Cecilita Caxiao. La extraña historia de cómo se salvó el diario de guerra de Blas de Lezo ("The forbidden loves of Cecilita Caxiao: the strange story of how Blas de Lezo's war diary was saved"), Amazon Media.
- Fernando de Artacho (2015), El almirante Mediohombre ("Admiral Half-man"), Algaida, Sevilla.

=== Arms ===
Coat of arms of Blas de Lezo
Coronet Coronet of a Marquess (posthumously bestowed) Escutcheon Quartered shield: first and fourth, gules, a star or; Second and third, or, a wolf sable Orders The Order of the Holy Spirit collar The Order of the Golden Fleece collar

== See also ==
- Viceroyalty of New Granada

== Bibliography ==
- James, Lawrence (2001). The Rise and Fall of the British Empire. Abacus. ISBN 0-312-16985-X.
- Quintero Saravia, Gonzalo M. (2002) Don Blas de Lezo: defensor de Cartagena de Indias Editorial Planeta Colombiana, Bogotá, Colombia, ISBN 958-42-0326-6, in Spanish
- Meisel Ujueta, Alfonso (1982) Blas de Lezo:vida legendaria del marino Vasco Litografía Dovel, Barranquilla, Colombia, OCLC 27881652, in Spanish
- Manfredi Cano, Domingo (1956) Blas de Lezo Publicaciones Españolas, Madrid, OCLC 17273075, in Spanish
- Barcáiztegui y Manso, José Javier de, Conde del Llobregat (1927) Un general español cojo, manco y tuerto, don Blas de Lezo, natural de Pasajes B. Valverde, Irún, Spain, OCLC 32539491, in Spanish
- Hartmann, Cyril Hughes (1953), The Angry Admiral. The Later Career of Edward Vernon, Admiral of the White, William Heinemann Ltd, London.
- Ranft, B. McL. (1958), The Vernon Papers, The Navy Records Society, London.
