= Restoration (Spain) =

Period in the history of Spain, 1874–1931

Kingdom of Spain Reino de España
- 1874–1931
- Flag Coat of arms
- Motto: Plus Ultra (Latin) "Further Beyond"
- Anthem: Marcha Real (Spanish) "Royal March"
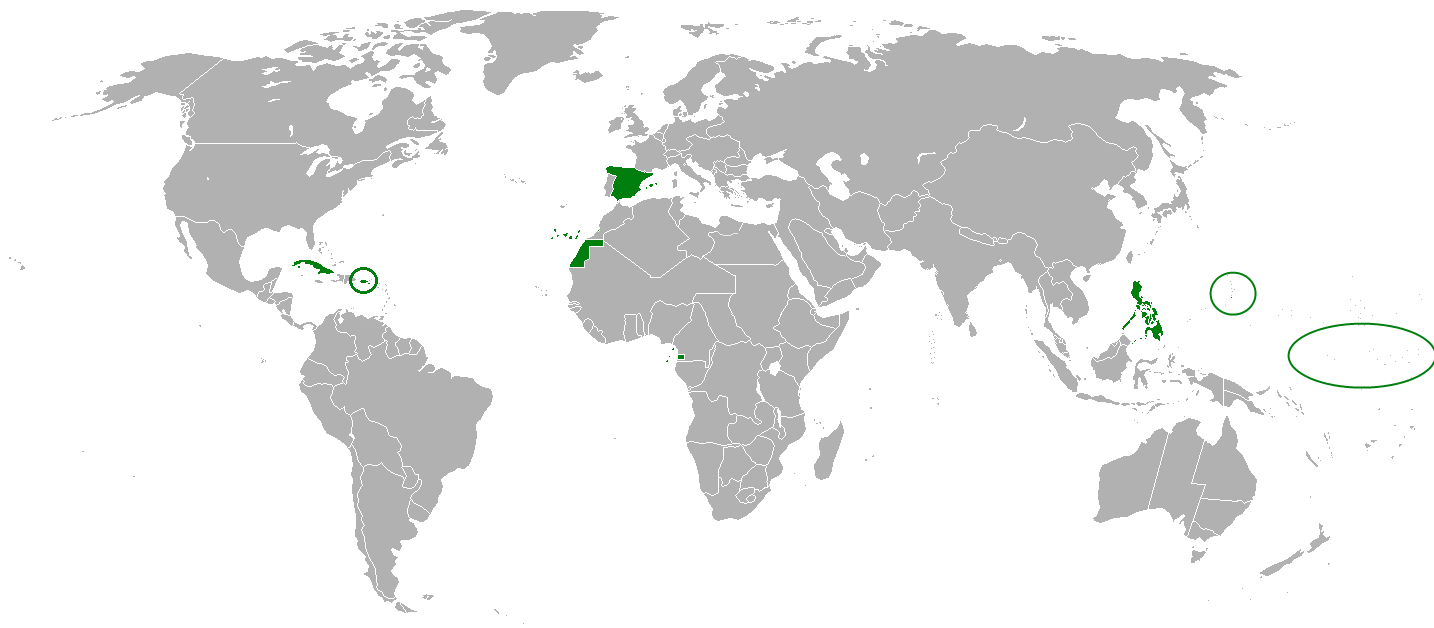
- The Kingdom of Spain and its overseas colonies in 1898
- Capital: Madrid
- Common languages: Spanish
- Religion: Roman Catholicism (state religion)
- Demonym: Spaniards
- Government: Unitary parliamentary semi-constitutional monarchy: under an anocratic partitocracy (1881–1916); under a military dictatorship (1923–1930; 1930–1931)
- King
  - 1874–1885: Alfonso XII
  - 1886–1931: Alfonso XIII
- Regent
  - 1885–1902: Maria Christina
- Prime Minister
  - 1874–1875 (first): Antonio Cánovas
  - 1931 (last): Juan B. Aznar
- Legislature: Cortes Generales
  - Upper house: Senate
  - Lower house: Congress of Deputies
- History
  - Pronunciamiento: 29 December 1874
  - Constitution adopted: 30 June 1876
  - Spanish–American War: April–August 1898
  - Second Melillan campaign: 1909–1910
  - Rif War: 1920–1926
  - Second Spanish Republic formed: 14 April 1931
- Currency: Spanish peseta
Preceded by
First Spanish Republic
Succeeded by
Dictatorial Government of the Philippines
German New Guinea
Cuba
Insular Government of Porto Rico
Guam
Second Spanish Republic

The Restoration (Spanish: Restauración) or Bourbon Restoration (Spanish: Restauración borbónica) was the period in Spanish history between the First Spanish Republic and the Second Spanish Republic from 1874 to 1931. It began on 29 December 1874, after a pronunciamento by General Arsenio Martínez Campos in Valencia ended the First Spanish Republic and restored the Bourbon monarchy under King Alfonso XII, and ended on 14 April 1931 with the proclamation of the Second Spanish Republic.

After nearly a century of political instability and several civil wars, the Restoration attempted to establish a new political system that ensured stability through the practice of turno, an intentional rotation of liberal and conservative parties in leadership, often achieved through electoral fraud. Critics of the turnismo system included republicans, socialists, communists, anarchists, Basque and Catalan nationalists, and Carlists. However, the relative stability to the turnismo system outlived its creator, the Conservative politician Antonio Cánovas del Castillo, and characterised the era with comparative peace, despite great social inequalities in the agricultural areas of Spain, and sporadic unrest relating to military defeats abroad.

During the interwar period, the Bourbon monarchy tied itself to the dictatorship of General Miguel Primo de Rivera in 1923, an event that succeeded by means of both a military coup d'état and the acquiescence of King Alfonso XIII. It took the protracted political turmoil in the wake of economic depression, caused by the aftermath of the First World War, and the Spanish defeat at the Annual in Morocco for the restored monarchy to be swept away with Rivera's dictatorship, ending with the general being forced to resign in 1930 and the king's voluntary dethronement and exile to Fascist Italy in 1931.

== Characteristics ==
The Restoration period was characterized by political instability, economic challenges, and social unrest. Key issues that defined the period include:

- Political conservatism: The Restoration was marked by a resurgence of conservative right-wing politics under the Conservative Party, led by Antonio Cánovas del Castillo, and the Liberal Party, led by Práxedes Mateo Sagasta, both supporting the restoration of the Bourbon monarchy. The new King Alfonso XII successfully restored stability after years of political upheaval and turmoil. However, this stability was often maintained through political repression and the silencing of genuine opposition.
- Economic struggles: During the Restoration, Spain faced several economic difficulties, such as high unemployment and inflation. The country also suffered from significant wealth disparities and social inequality, with a small but wealthy authoritarian elite controlling most of Spain's resources.
- Social unrest: The period witnessed waves of social upheaval and the growth of republican, socialist, communist, and anarchist movements. These political groups, along with labor unions such as the socialist Unión General de Trabajadores (UGT) and the anarchist Confederación Nacional del Trabajo (CNT), sought to address the social and economic inequalities within Spanish society, and often clashed with the liberal–conservative government supporting the Bourbon monarchy. Wars of national liberation in the former colonies of the Spanish Empire continued to spread among its remaining overseas territories after the Spanish American wars of independence (1808–1833).
- Regional tensions: Spain has a long history of regional tensions, which further intensified during the Restoration. Various independence movements in Spain emerged in different regions calling for greater administrative autonomy and self-governance, such as Catalonia, Galicia, and the Basque Country.
- War: In 1898, Spain lost nearly all its remaining colonies in the Spanish–American War, including Cuba, Guam, Puerto Rico, and the Philippines (1833–1898). This defeat was a major blow to Spanish national pride and significantly impacted the country's economic and political decline. Conflict with the Kingdom of Morocco, coming to a head in the Rif War (1920–1926), worsened economic conditions and morale.
- Cultural revival: Despite political and economic challenges, Spain experienced a cultural revival during this period. Spanish art, literature, and music experienced renewed interest, and many important cultural figures emerged.

== Alfonso XII and the Regency of Maria Christina (1874–1898) ==
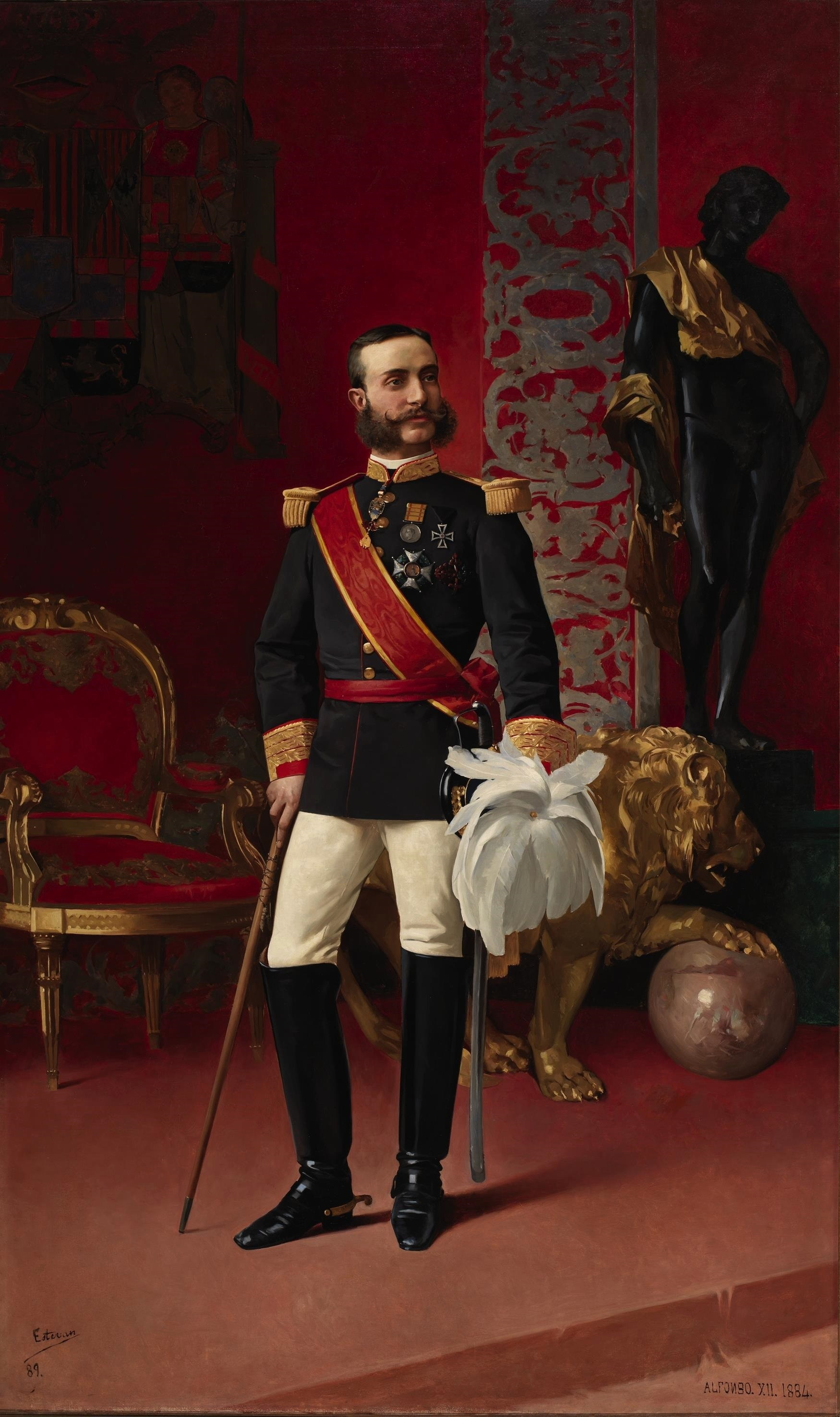
Portrait of King Alfonso XII. Oil on canvas by Enrique Estevan y Vicente (1889), Teatro Real, Madrid, Spain.

On 29 December 1874, General Arsenio Martínez Campos's pronunciamiento overthrew the First Spanish Republic by triumphal entry on behalf of Alfonso XII into Valencia, and thereby restored the monarchy, crowning Alfonso XII, son of the exiled Isabella II, as King of Spain. Having returned from Paris where his mother had abdicated de jure in 1870 in exile, he was crowned early in 1875. Having been educated at the Theresianum in Vienna and Sandhurst in Britain, he was cosmopolitan and well groomed to reign.

The Constitution of 1876 was soon established; it remained in force throughout the Restoration. This constitution established Spain as a constitutional monarchy with a bicameral legislature (Cortes Generales) consisting of an upper house (Senate) and a lower house (Congress of Deputies). The King held the power to appoint senators and to annul laws at his discretion. He was given the honorific title of Commander-in-Chief of the army. The Liberal Party, led by Práxedes Mateo Sagasta, and the Conservative Party, led by Antonio Cánovas del Castillo, alternated in power through the controlled process of turnismo, or el turno pacífico. Local figures, known as caciques, manipulated the election results, fueling growing resentment of the system. This led to the formation of major nationalist movements and unions in Catalonia, Galicia, and the Basque Country. However the relative stability of this system after the upheavals of the Liberal Sexennial (1868–1874) gave him the nickname of El Pacificador ("the Peacemaker").

Alfonso XII had lost his first wife, María de las Mercedes of Orléans, in 1878, mourning her at the royal hunting lodge of the Palace of Riofrio, and then died in November 1885 from a recurrence of dysentery. At that time, his second wife Maria Cristina was pregnant. Their son Alfonso XIII was born on 17 May 1886, and a Regency was formed, headed by the Queen Mother Maria Cristina.

== Reign of Alfonso XIII and crisis of the system (1898–1923) ==
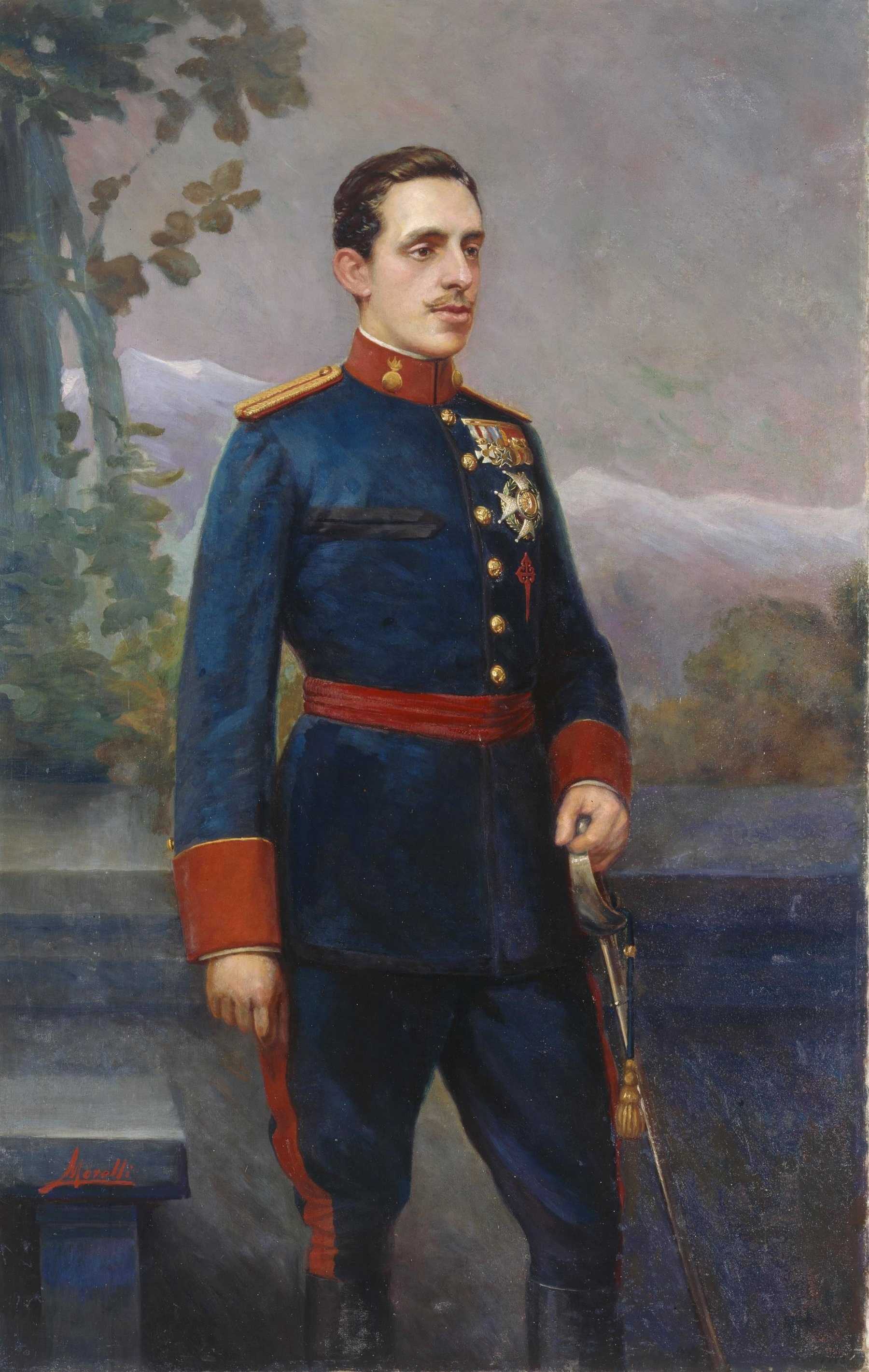
Portrait of King Alfonso XIII in uniform, displaying the badges of the Order of Santiago and Laureate Cross of Saint Ferdinand. Oil on canvas by Víctor Morelli Sánchez-Gil (1910), Museo del Prado, Madrid, Spain.

The new reign was initially popular with the subjects of el rey niño ("the child-king"), and a Le Figaro article described Alfonso XIII in 1889 as "the happiest and best-loved of all the rulers on Earth". However, wars of national liberation fought by anti-imperialist revolutionaries in the Caribbean (Cuba and Puerto Rico) and Pacific Ocean (Guam and the Philippines) against the Spanish Empire (1833–1898) continued to drain resources, and domestic discontent meant that Antonio Cánovas del Castillo, architect of the turnismo political system, was assassinated by a Spanish anarchist in 1897. Eventually, the Spanish–American War led to the loss of Spain's last major overseas colonies in 1898. This rapid collapse devastated Spain and damaged the credibility of the government and its associated ideologies. It also nearly caused a military coup d'état led by General Camilo García de Polavieja. This event marked the beginning of the country's political and economic decline, giving rise to numerous conflicting opposition movements at local and national levels. Alfonso XIII came of age in May 1902 and was crowned on 17 May 1902, ending the regency of the Queen Mother.

Spain began her international rehabilitation by selling her remaining colonial possessions to the German Empire in 1899, and being awarded the mainland of Spanish Guinea, the Río Muni, in a common agreement with Republican France in 1900. This took off after the Algeciras Conference of 1906. Spain was accorded by common consent of the European Great Powers against the sabre rattling foreign policy of Kaiser Wilhelm II, a Spanish sphere of influence in northern Morocco that became a formal protectorate in 1912 by the Treaty of Fez, giving the Spanish military a new outlet after the loss of 1898 to expend itself upon and thus was born the "Africanist" ideology, which Alfonso became a leading supporter of up until his abdication. In 1907, it signed the Pact of Cartagena with France and Great Britain, a defensive alliance against the Triple Alliance. The Spanish government was able to begin rebuilding its fleet and built the España-class battleship and the Reina Victoria Eugenia-class battleship. The last was named after Alfonso's new British wife, Victoria Eugenia of Battenberg (nicknamed Ena), granddaughter of Queen Victoria. Their marriage produced two haemophiliac sons, however, and Alfonso never forgave his wife, starting numerous affairs with other women.

In 1909, failed attempts to conquer Morocco led to domestic discontent, culminating in a revolt known as the Semana Tragica in Barcelona, Catalonia. The rebellion, led mainly by lower-class citizens and supported by anarchists, communists, and republicans, was a response to what they saw as unfair practices in recruiting soldiers. The government declared a state of war and sent in troops to put down the uprising, which resulted in more than a hundred deaths and the execution of the anarchist educator Francisco Ferrer. The socialist Unión General de Trabajadores (UGT) and the anarchist Confederación Nacional del Trabajo (CNT) attempted to organize a national general strike, but the unions were only able to mobilize urban workers.

When World War I broke out in 1914, Spain remained neutral; as a result, its economic and industrial growth largely derived from exporting arms to the Entente from the armaments sector in towns like Eibar, Basque Country, located nearby the Spanish–French border. Spain profited too by diplomatically taking over the consulates of warring nations and acting as an intermediary. Notwithstanding a brief war scare when the German high command resumed to unrestricted submarine warfare in Spring 1917, which saw the United States enter the war (April 1917) and Spain nearly do the same, Alfonso XIII offered to mediate peace on several instances, offered the dispossessed Romanov family shelter in Spain after the Bolshevik Revolution (October 1917), established in the Royal Palace of Madrid an office for finding lost relatives that earned him a Nobel Peace Prize recommendation, and the Spanish Consul in Jerusalem, Antonio de Ballobar, negotiated the handover of the Holy City to the British forces led by General Sir Edmund Allenby (December 1917). The left-wing strikes of 1917–1918 and the economic bubble's bursting after the end of the war left Spain rocked by financial crisis, while the 1918–1920 flu pandemic resulted in the death of 200,000 Spaniards (1% of the population).

The King and the conservatives shifted increasingly in reaction away from stability in turnismo after the entry of radical republicans and far-left groups into the Cortes Generales, such as the creation of the Spanish Communist Party (1920–1921), and became more and more authoritarian. In 1921, conflict in Spanish-ruled Morocco escalated, beginning the Rif War (1920–1926). A group of Moroccan militants from the Republic of the Rif launched a surprise attack on the Army of Spanish Morocco. Led by the Moroccan chieftain Abd el-Krim, a coalition of Riffians and Jebala nearly annihilated the Spanish forces numbering some 10,000-13,000 men and pushed them back toward Melilla in the battle of Annual. The top military officers were blamed for the Spanish defeat due to poor planning. This led to lowered morale among the military, who felt misunderstood as they were ordered to advance inland without adequate resources to occupy the difficult terrain. A parliamentary inquiry was launched, and the purported role of the King in insisting on advance even in spite of advice to the contrary was seized upon by the Republican Party as proof of his incompetence as late as 1931. Prime Minister Eduardo Dato was assassinated by motorcycle-riding gunmen in March as well, the third such minister to be so killed in three decades, and Spain reeled from one crisis after another crisis.

== Dictatorship of Primo de Rivera (1923–1930) ==
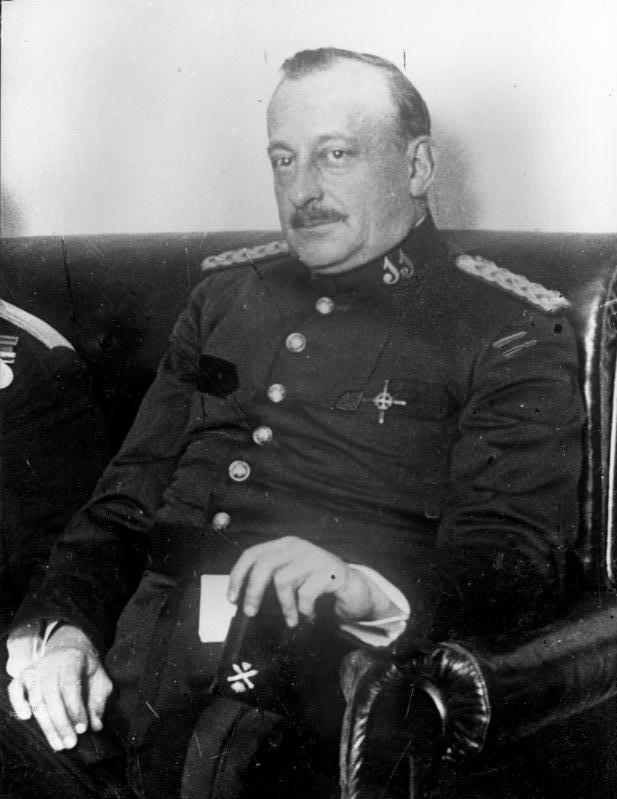
Photograph of General Miguel Primo de Rivera (March 1930). Berlin, Bundesarchiv, Germany.

Military and civil unrest grew, amplified by fears of anarchist terrorism or proletarian revolution and the rise of nationalist movements. On 13 September 1923, Miguel Primo de Rivera, Captain General of Catalonia, staged a coup d'état and deposed Prime Minister Manuel García Prieto after issuing a manifesto blaming Spain's problems on the parliamentary system. Alfonso XIII supported the general and appointed him the new prime minister.

Primo de Rivera suspended the constitution and assumed absolute powers as a dictator. Despite his backing of abandonismo, he was the one who defeated Abd el-Krim after he attacked the French zone, obliging French marshal Philippe Pétain to enter into joint military operations with the Spanish at Alhucemas Bay in 1925 that led to the defeat of the Rif Republic. He created the Unión Patriótica Española, the only recognized political party, and banned all others. He increased spending on businesses and public services, which led to the bankruptcy of his government. As a result of these actions, the military withdrew their support. Alfonso XIII did the same and forced him to resign in January 1930.

== Final years (1930–1931) ==
Alfonso XIII attempted to gradually restore the previous system and bolster his prestige by enlisting General Dámaso Berenguer as Prime Minister. However, due to the king's perceived support of the dictatorship, this proved unsuccessful and led to growing calls for the establishment of a republic. On 17 August 1930, republican groups formed the Pact of San Sebastián, forming a revolutionary committee that would later become the leadership of the Second Spanish Republic.

Berenguer eventually resigned, and the king appointed Admiral Juan Bautista Aznar-Cabañas in his place. On 12 April 1931, Aznar called for local elections to appease the democrats and republicans, replace the local governing bodies of the dictatorship, and gradually restore the restoration.

Although the monarchists still had some support, the republican and socialist parties won an overwhelming victory. Their victory led to street riots and demands for the abolition of the monarchy. On 14 April, the king fled Spain after the army announced it would not defend him. A provisional government led by Niceto Alcalá-Zamora immediately established the Second Spanish Republic.

== See also ==
- House of Bourbon
- Contemporary history of Spain
- Monarchism
- Political system of the Restoration (Spain)
- Spanish–Moroccan conflicts

== Bibliography ==
- Barton, Simon. A History of Spain (2009) excerpt and text search
- Beck, Earl Ray. Time of Triumph & Sorrow: Spanish Politics during the Reign of Alfonso XII, 1874–1885 (1979)
- Ben-Ami, Shlomo. "The Dictatorship of Primo de Rivera: A Political Reassessment," Journal of Contemporary History, Jan 1977, Vol. 12 Issue 1, pp 65–84 in JSTOR
- Carr, Raymond, ed. Spain: A History (2001) online
- Esdaile, Charles J. Spain in the Liberal Age: From Constitution to Civil War, 1808–1939 (2000) excerpt and text search
- Hall, Morgan C. "Alfonso XIII and the Failure of the Liberal Monarchy in Spain, 1902–1923" (PhD dissertation, Columbia University; ProQuest Dissertations Publishing, 2003. 3095625)
- Luengo, Jorge, and Pol Dalmau. "Writing Spanish history in the global age: connections and entanglements in the nineteenth century." Journal of global history 13.3 (2018): 425–445. DOI: https://doi.org/10.1017/S1740022818000220
- Payne, Stanley G. A History of Spain and Portugal. Vol. 2 After 1700 (1973) pp 488-512, 578-629. online
- Payne, Stanley G. "Spanish Conservatism 1834–1923," Journal of Contemporary History, Vol. 13, No. 4, (Oct. 1978), pp. 765–789 in JSTOR
- Winston, Colin M. "The Proletarian Carlist Road to Fascism: Sindicalismo Libre," Journal of Contemporary History Vol. 17, No. 4 (Oct., 1982), pp. 557–585 in JSTOR
