= Spain during World War I =

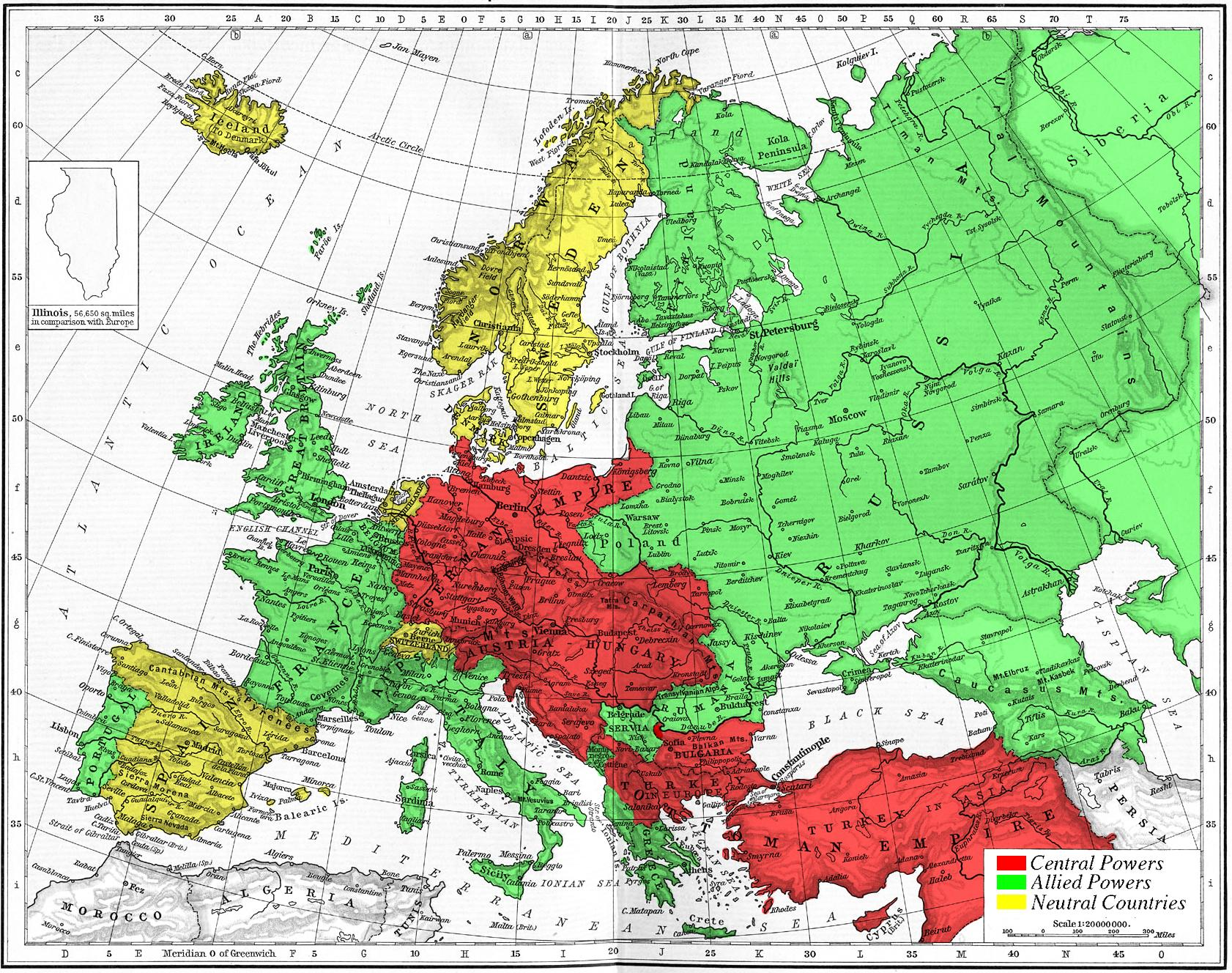
As can be seen on this map, Spain was far from the main battlefields, located on the Franco-German border, northern Italy, Russia and the Ottoman Empire.

Spain remained neutral throughout World War I between 28 July 1914 and 11 November 1918, and despite domestic economic difficulties, it was considered "one of the most important neutral countries in Europe by 1915". Spain had maintained a non-aligned stance during the political difficulties of pre-war Europe, and continued its neutrality after the war until the Spanish Civil War began in 1936. While there was no direct military involvement in the war, German forces were interned in Spanish Guinea in late 1915.

== Spanish neutrality ==
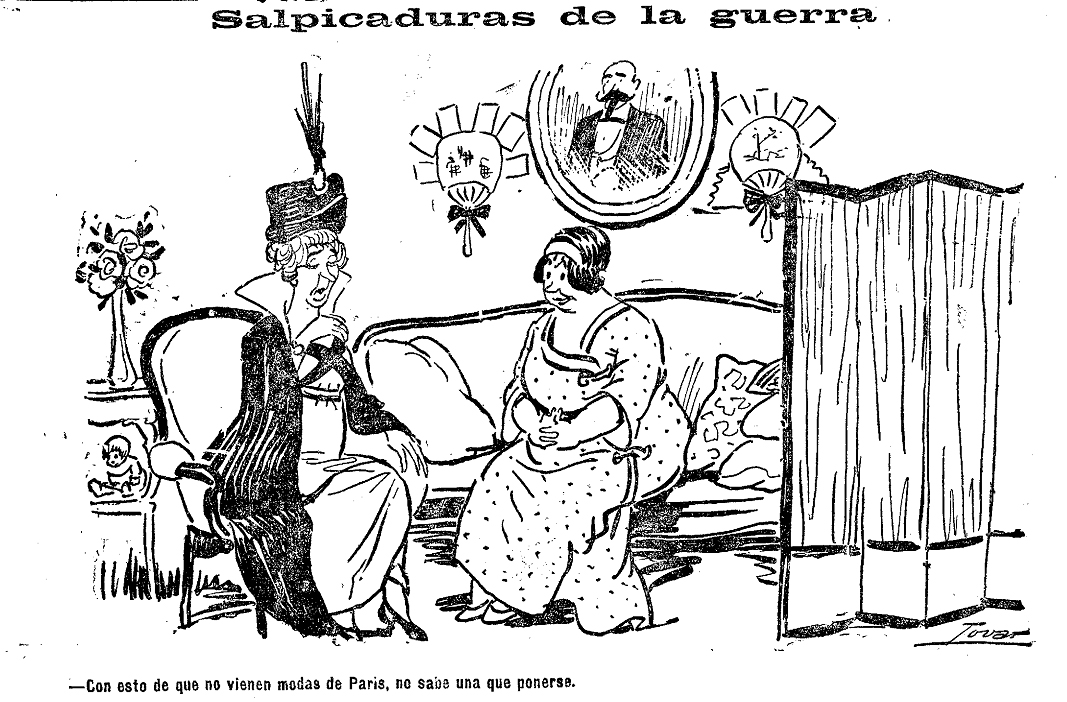
Sprinklings of the War: "Without fashions coming from Paris, I don't know what to put on."

The Spanish prime minister, Eduardo Dato, a Conservative, declared neutrality by Royal Decree on 7 August 1914:

"Existent, sadly, the state of war between Austria, Hungary and Serbia [...] the Government of His Majesty believes in the duty to order the strictest neutrality to Spanish subjects."

Dato was applauded for this in the Cortes when they reconvened on 30 October. Opinion among the Spanish public was divided, which contributed to the country staying out of the war. The upper classes (the aristocracy and the rich bourgeoisie), the Spanish Catholic Church and the Spanish Army generally favored the Central Powers, usually identified with Germany. Among political parties, the Germanophile tendency was represented among the reactionary Carlists and the conservative Mauristas, followers of Antonio Maura, who himself favoured closer ties with the Allies because of Spain's 1907 pact with Britain and France, which was designed to head off German colonialism in north Africa. Pro-Allied sentiment, which was generally Francophile, was most common among the middle and professional classes and intellectuals. It was common among Catalan nationalists, Republicans and Socialists. A few Liberals, including Álvaro de Figueroa, leader of the opposition in the Cortes, were also pro-Allied, along with Miguel de Unamuno and other select members of the Spanish intelligentsia.

The Italian government's initial neutrality was a key factor in the Spanish government also being able to declare itself neutral. The Pact of Cartagena of 1907 provided that the Spanish fleet would support the French Navy in case of war with the Triple Alliance. This anticipated Franco/Spanish naval co-operation against the combined fleets of the Kingdom of Italy and Austria-Hungary in the Mediterranean Sea, while the Royal Navy focused on the North Sea against the Imperial German Navy. The French fleet alone could not contain the Italian and Austro-Hungarian fleets together while transporting its colonial troops from North Africa to the European continent.

=== Spanish Armed Forces ===
Mauser Model 1893.

Throughout 1914-18 the Spanish Army continued to be maintained on a peacetime basis without the extended mobilisation measures of other neutral nations (Netherlands, Denmark, Switzerland and Sweden) in closer proximity to areas of actual fighting. Except in Morocco, Spanish troops continued to wear colourful dress uniforms for parade and off-duty wear; a feature that quickly disappeared in all armies directly involved in the war.

The main rifle of the Spanish Army at this time was a version of the Mauser, manufactured in Oviedo in 7 mm caliber, known as the Mauser Model 1893 rifle. To this was added a small number of machine guns such as the Maxim gun, Hotchkiss M1909 and even the M1895 Colt. However, the number of machine guns per company or division was much lower than in the rest of the European countries. The artillery was made up of cannons made by Krupp or various versions of the Schneider cannon made in Trubia and Seville. Most were being used in the Rif War being fought in northern Morocco (Rif), where Spain had been granted a protectorate.

The Spanish Navy was barely a shadow of its former self, though it was starting to rebuild. Its best units were the dreadnought España and the pre-dreadnought Pelayo and, under construction, the dreadnoughts Alfonso XIII and Jaime I. The navy had the armored cruisers Carlos V, Princesa de Asturias, and Cataluña, the protected cruisers Río de la Plata (es:Río de la Plata), Extremadura (es:Extremadura), and Reina Regente, the unprotected cruiser Infanta Isabel and, under construction, the light cruiser Victoria Eugenia. In addition there were seven destroyers: four of the Furor-class and, under construction, three new destroyers of the Bustamante-class, which were joined by the four Recalde-class and Álvaro de Bazán-class gunboats, in addition to other, older gunboats such as Mac-Mahón and Temerario.

Finally, the massive construction of T-1 class torpedo boats began, of which six had already been commissioned, together with the older torpedo boats Orión, Habana, and Halcón torpedo boats. Finally, the navy also included the typical conglomerate of tugboats, cutters, gunboats, and small boats.

In short, the Spanish Navy of 1914 was composed largely of older ships that were not sunk near Cuba and the Philippines during the Spanish–American War, either because they survived the naval battles or because they were part of Admiral Manuel de la Cámara's fleet, which had not been involved in the conflict. Other ships had been built recently under the Ferrándiz Plan.

The Military Aeronautics (predecessor of the Spanish Air Force) had just been created in 1913, so it had few units. All the planes were bombers, since the fighters did not appear until well into the war. Of biplanes it had Farman MF.7, Farman MF.11, Lohner B.I; and monoplanes with several Morane-Saulnier G and Nieuport II, which together formed the Military Aeronautics, to which a few more biplanes and the first seaplanes of the Naval Aeronautics would later be added.

Spanish neutrality left the country outside the technological advances derived from war needs, so that, at the end of the war in November 1918, the Spanish Military Aviation was in a situation of clear inferiority in means compared to those of the other neighbouring countries.

Some pictures of Spanish Armed Forces of that time

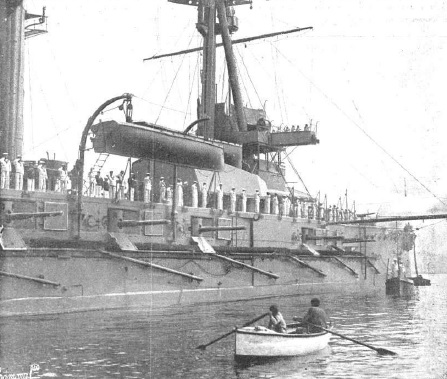
Battleship España, of the España-class battleship, in the port of Bilbao on the occasion of a Royal visit in 1915.

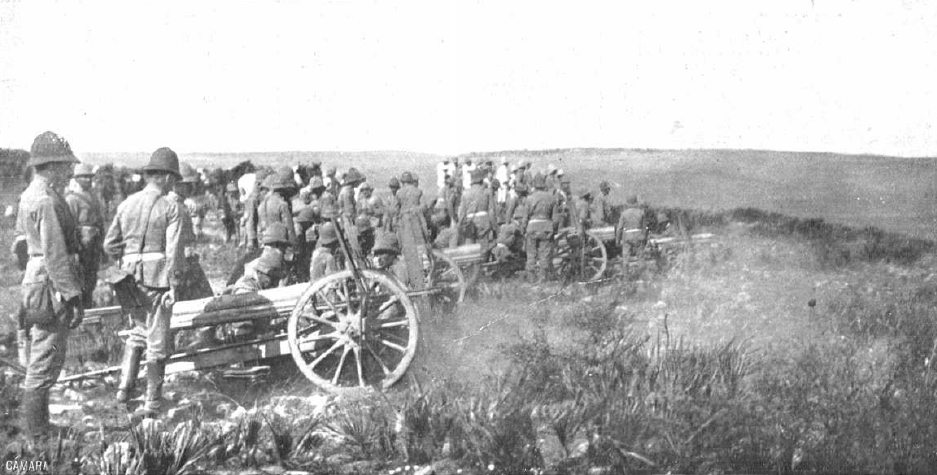
Spanish artillery in action in September 1913 in the Gaba forest during the Rif War.

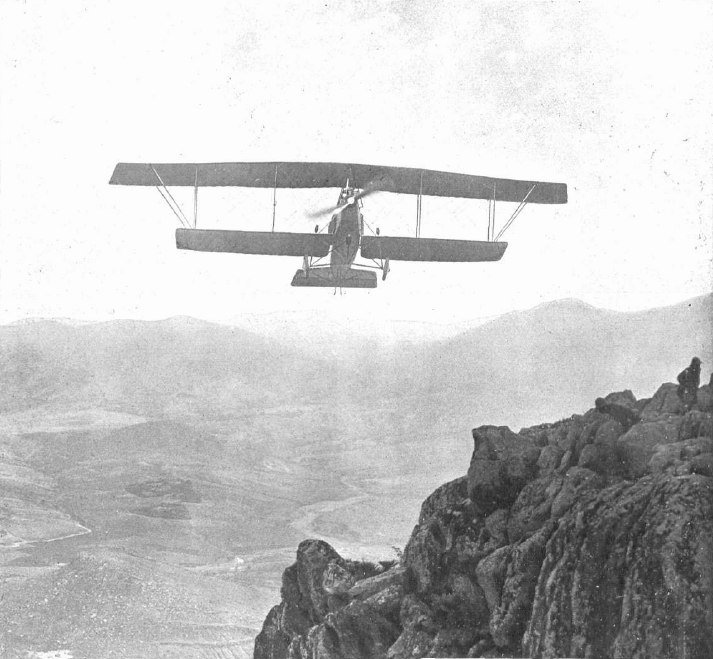
A Lohner B.I airplane of the Spanish Army returning to its base in the Tetuan area in 1913.

== Effects of war ==
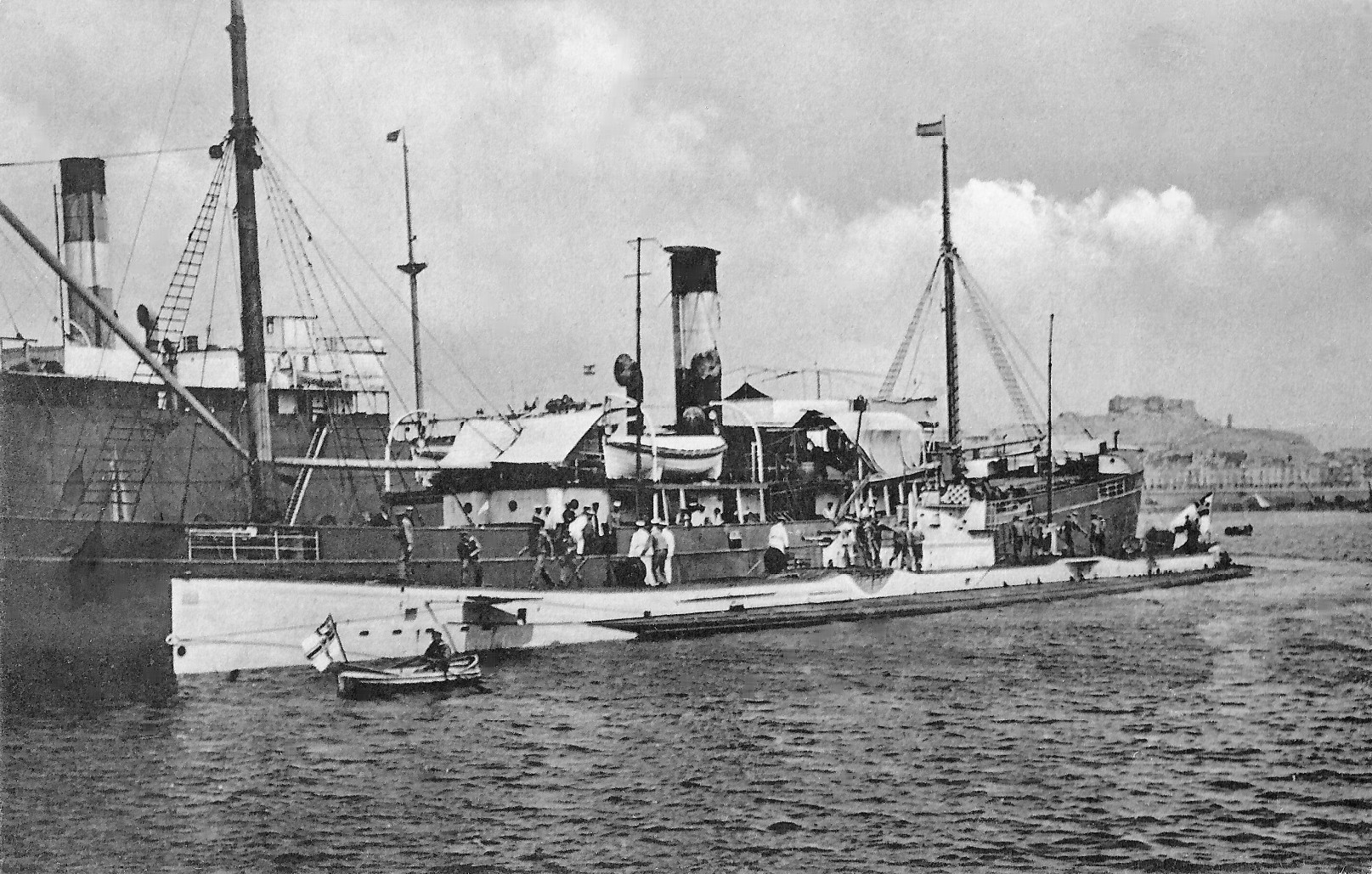
The German submarine SM U-35 next to the merchant ship Roma, also German, in the port of Cartagena. The visit of the submersible on June 21, 1916, endangered Spanish neutrality in the Great War. It is estimated that German submarines caused losses of between 139,000 and 250,000 tons in the Spanish merchant fleet. Four German submarines were interned in Spain (the SM UB-23 in La Coruña, the SM U-39 in Cartagena, the SM UC-56 in Santander and SM UB-49 in Cádiz) and two others visited Spanish ports, one of them, the aforementioned U-35, transporting to Cartagena a letter from the Kaiser to the King.

Though it remained one of the few neutral countries in mainland Europe, Spain was still affected by the conflict in a variety of ways.

Economically Spain experienced both positive and negative consequences from the war. Spanish maritime trade was significantly impacted by German U-boat campaigns, with an estimated 100 lives and 66 ships lost to submarines. Though Spanish industry in the north and the east of the country expanded as demand rose among the warring powers for Spanish goods, the inflow of capital produced inflation. Furthermore, imports dropped, and this combination exacerbated the poverty of the rural areas and the south. The growing poverty intensified internal migration to the industrial areas, and the railway system was unable to bear the increased demand. Spain experienced a scarcity in food commodities. The shortage of basic commodities became known as the crisis de subsistencias. In 1915, food riots erupted in some cities, and in December 1915, the government resigned, to be replaced by a Liberal government under Figueroa.

In July 1916, the two main trade unions, the socialist Unión General de Trabajadores and the anarcho-syndicalist Confederación Nacional del Trabajo, joined forces to put pressure on the Liberal government. In March 1917, they even threatened to start a general strike. Their example inspired military officers to form unions of their own, the juntas de defensa. The officers' goal was to prevent the passage of the Bill of Military Reform tabled in the Cortes in 1916, that sought to professionalise the military by introducing intellectual and physical tests as prerequisites for promotions; the ultimate goal being a reduction in the size of the bloated officers corps. The juntas de defensa demanded that promotions and pay increases continue to be based strictly on seniority.

The war also had a significant impact on the construction program of the Spanish Navy. The second and third España-class battleships, built in Spain between 1910 and 1919, were delayed significantly because of material shortages from Britain. Most importantly, the main battery guns for Jaime I did not arrive until 1919, after the war had ended. The projected Reina Victoria Eugenia-class battleships, which also would have relied heavily on imported guns and armour plate, were cancelled outright after the war started.

Also significant were the social impacts of the war. Though Spain as a whole was neutral throughout the war, the conflict split the country into groups of 'Francophiles' and 'Germanophiles' who each sympathised with the opposing Entente and Central Powers, the rift being only deepened by the ongoing U-boat campaign which continued to impact Spanish ships. The army, clergy and conservatives were inclined to be pro-German whereas merchants, liberals, republicans and most of the public leaned towards the Allied cause. Intellectuals were divided.

The Spanish public became aware of the harsh realities of the war itself by contact with a migratory influx of approximately 10,000 Spanish workers who returned home from Belgium, France and Germany.

Spanish journalists also acted as war correspondents near the battlefront, keeping the public informed with regard to the conflict and conditions, with opposing viewpoints in these reports often also contributing to the varying sympathies of the country and the divide as a whole.

As early as August 1914, some Spaniards were volunteering to enlist in the French Army, mainly joining the Foreign Legion. In 1915, they founded their own magazine, Iberia, to defend and propagate their cause. In February 1916, the Comitè de Germanor (Committee of Brotherhood) was set up in Barcelona to recruit for the Legion. Over 2,000 Spaniards ultimately served in the Legion. King Alfonso XIII also tried to help in the war by creating the European War Office.

=== Fernando Po affair ===
A map of Río Muni, part of Spanish Guinea, 1903.

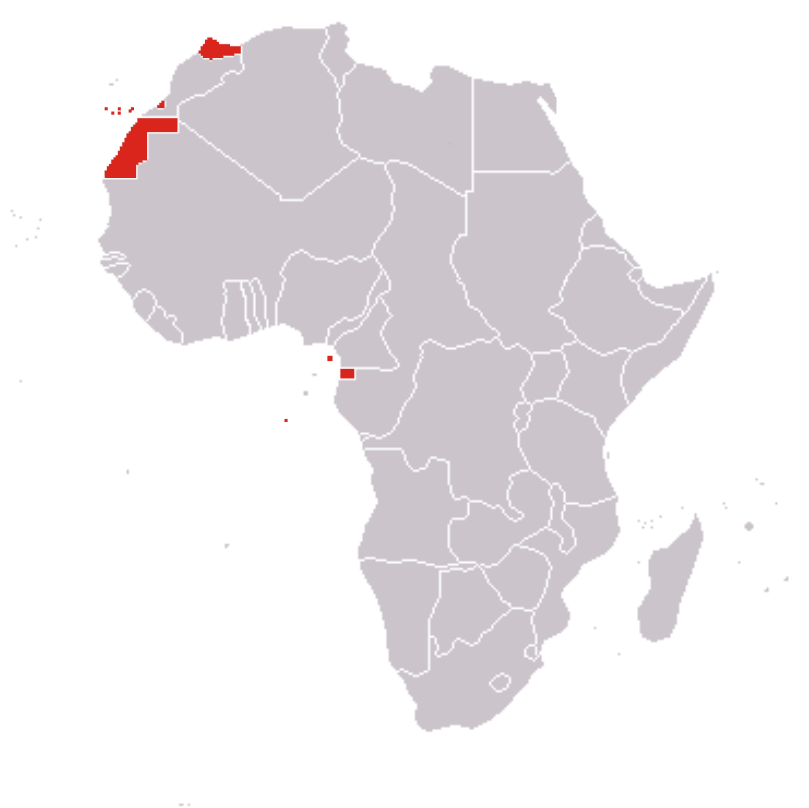
Spanish Africa during the twentieth century (including Fernando Po and the Canary Islands)

In 1916, the Fernando Po Affair threatened Spanish neutrality. British, French and Belgian forces had occupied German Cameroon, forcing 6,000 Schutztruppe (indigenous colonial troops led by German officers) to retreat into neighbouring Spanish Guinea. While formally interned on the Spanish colonial island of Fernando Po, this formidable force of well-disciplined troops continued to drill and train under German control.

Perceiving an ongoing threat to their own African possessions, the Allies threatened to invade the Spanish colony. The Spanish Government was able to defuse the situation by transferring the German officers to Spain itself while the African Schutztruppe remained on Fernando Po until the Armistice of 11 November 1918.

== See also ==
- Spanish flu
- Diplomatic history of World War I
- International relations (1814–1919)
- Spain during World War II
