= Pact of Cartagena =

Agreement between Spain, Britain and France

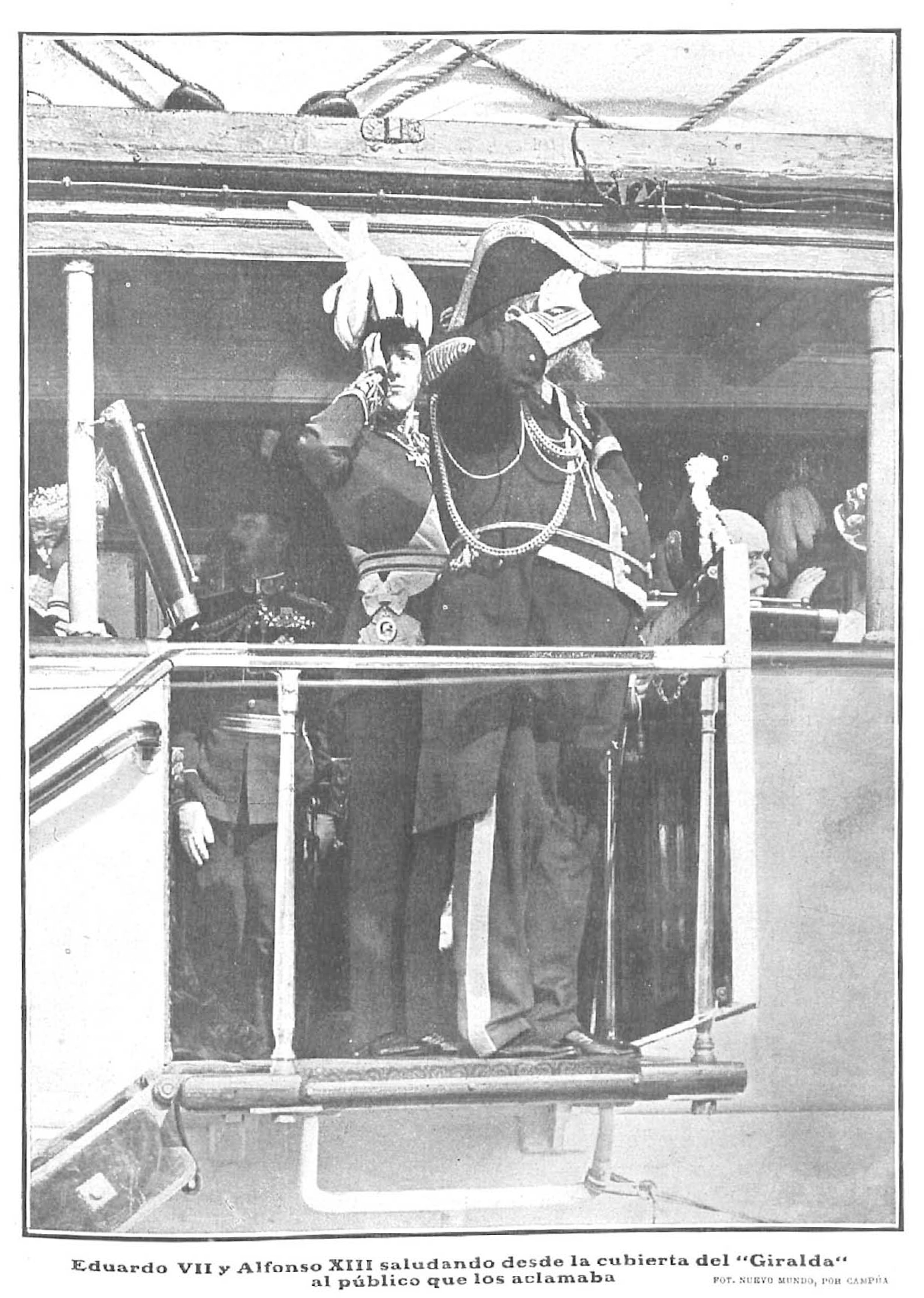
Edward VII and Alfonso XIII during the official visit of the former to Cartagena in April 1907

The Pact of Cartagena was an exchange of notes that took place in Cartagena, Spain on 16 May 1907 between France, Great Britain, and Spain. The parties declared their intention to preserve the status quo in the western Mediterranean and in the Atlantic, especially their insular and coastal possessions. The pact aligned Spain with the Anglo-French entente cordiale against Germany's ambitions in Morocco, where both Spain and France had mutually recognized (and British-recognized) spheres of influence.

During the First World War, the Pact was cited by those Spanish politicians who favoured closer ties with, or even intervention on the side of, the Entente. On 21 April 1915, the leading conservative politician in Spain, Antonio Maura, made a public statement that:

Spain has the position in northern Africa and in the western Mediterranean which was granted to her by that agreement, she has a community of interests with England and France and the reciprocal promise of maintaining and working in favor of this community, and of this status quo[,] was given by the powers concerned.

== Texts of notes ==
Note by Edward Grey to the Marqués de Villaurrutia	Note by Villaurrutia to Grey	Note by Fernando León y Castillo to Stephen Pichon	Note by Pichon to León y Castillo
Animated by the desire to contribute in every possible way to the maintenance of peace, and convinced that the preservation of the territorial status quo and the rights of Great Britain and Spain in the Mediterranean and that part of the Atlantic Ocean which washes the shores of Europe and Africa must materially serve this end, and is, moreover, to the mutual advantage of the two nations bound to each other by the closest ties of ancient friendship and of community interests. The Government of His Britannic Majesty desire to lay before that of his Catholic Majesty the following declaration of policy, in the confident hope that it will not only still further strengthen the good understanding so happily existing between them, but will also promote the cause of peace. The general policy of the Government of His Britannic Majesty in the regions above defined is directed to the maintenance of the territorial status quo, and the in pursuance of this policy they are firmly resolved to preserve intact the rights of the British Crown over its insular and maritime possessions in these regions. Should circumstances arise which, in the opinion of the Government of His Britannic Majesty, would alter, or tend to alter, the existing territorial status quo in the said regions, they will communicate with the Government of His Catholic Majesty in order to afford them the opportunity to concert, if desired, by mutual agreement the course of action which the two powers shall adopt in common.	Animado del deseo de contribuir por todos los medios posibles a la conservación de la paz, y convencido de que el mantenimiento del statu quo territorial y de los derechos de España y de la Gran Bretaña en el Mediterráneo y en la parte del Atlántico que baña las costas de Europa y de Africa debe servir eficazmente para alcanzar ese fin, siendo al mismo tiempo beneficioso para ambas naciones, unidas además por los lazos de secular amistad y por la comunidad de intereses; El Gobierno de Su Majestad Católica desea poner en conocimiento del Gobierno de Su Majestad Británica la declaración cuyo tenor sigue, con la firme esperanza de que contribuirá, no solamente a afianzar la buena inteligencia que tan felizmente existe entre ambos Gobiernos, sino también a servir la causa de la paz: La política general del Gobierno de Su Majestad Católica en las regiones arriba indicadas tiene por objeto el mantenimiento del statu quo territorial, y, conforme a tal política, dicho Gobierno está firmemente resuelto a conservar intactos los derechos de la Corona Española sobre sus posesiones insulares y marítimas situadas en las referidas regiones. En el caso de que nuevas circunstancias pudiesen modificar o contribuir a modificar el statu quo territorial actual, dicho Gobierno entrará en comunicación con el Gobierno de Su Majestad Británica, a fin de poner a ambos Gobiernos en condiciones de concertarse, si lo juzgan oportuno, respecto a las medidas que hubieran de tomarse en común.	Animado del deseo de contribuir por todos los medios posibles a la conservación de la paz, y convencido de que el mantenimiento del statu quo territorial y de los derechos de España y de Francia en el Mediterráneo y en la parte del Atlántico que baña las costas de Europa y de Africa debe servir eficazmente para alcanzar ese fin, siendo al mismo tiempo beneficioso para ambas naciones, unidas además por los lazos de secular amistad y por la comunidad de intereses; El Gobierno de Su Majestad Católica desea poner en conocimiento del Gobierno de la Republica Francesa la declaración cuyo tenor sigue, con la firme esperanza de que contribuirá, no solamente a afianzar la buena inteligencia que tan felizmente existe entre ambos Gobiernos, sino también a servir la causa de la paz: La política general del Gobierno de Su Majestad Católica en las regiones arriba indicadas tiene por objeto el mantenimiento del statu quo territorial, y, conforme a tal política, dicho Gobierno está firmemente resuelto a conservar intactos los derechos de la Corona Española sobre sus posesiones insulares y marítimas situadas en las referidas regiones. En el caso de que nuevas circunstancias pudiesen modificar o contribuir a modificar el statu quo territorial actual, dicho Gobierno entrará en comunicación con el Gobierno de la Republica Francesa, a fin de poner a ambos Gobiernos en condiciones de concertarse, si lo juzgan oportuno, respecto a las medidas que hubieran de tomarse en común.	Animé du désir de contribuer par tous les moyens possibles à la conservation de la paix et convaincu que le maintien du statu quo territorial et des droits de la France et de l’Espagne dans la Méditerranée et dans la partie de l’Atlantique qui baigne les côtes de l’Europe et de l’Afrique doit servir efficacement à atteindre ce but, tout en étant profitable aux deux nations qu’unissent d’ailleurs les liens d’une amitié séculaire et la communauté des intérêts; Le Gouvernement de la République Française desire porter à la connaissance de Sa Majesté Catholique la déclaration dont la teneur suit, avec le ferme espoir qu’elle contribuera non seulement à affermir la bonne entente qui existe si heureusement entre les deux Gouvernements, mais aussi a servir la cause de la paix : La politique générale du Gouvernement de la République Française dans les régions susindiquées à pour objet le maintien du statu quo territorial et, conformément à cette politique, ce gouvernement est fermement résolu à conserver intacts les droits de la République Française sur ses possessions insulaires et maritimes situées dans les dites régions. Dans le cas ou se produiraient de nouvelles circonstances qui, selon l’opinion du Gouvernement de la République Française, seraient de nature ou à modifier ou à contribuer à modifier le statu quo territorial actuel, ce Gouvernement entrera en communication avec le Gouvernement de Sa Majesté Catholique, afin de mettre les deux Gouvernements en état de se concerter, s’il est jugé désirable, sur les mesures à prendre en commun.

== Aftermath ==
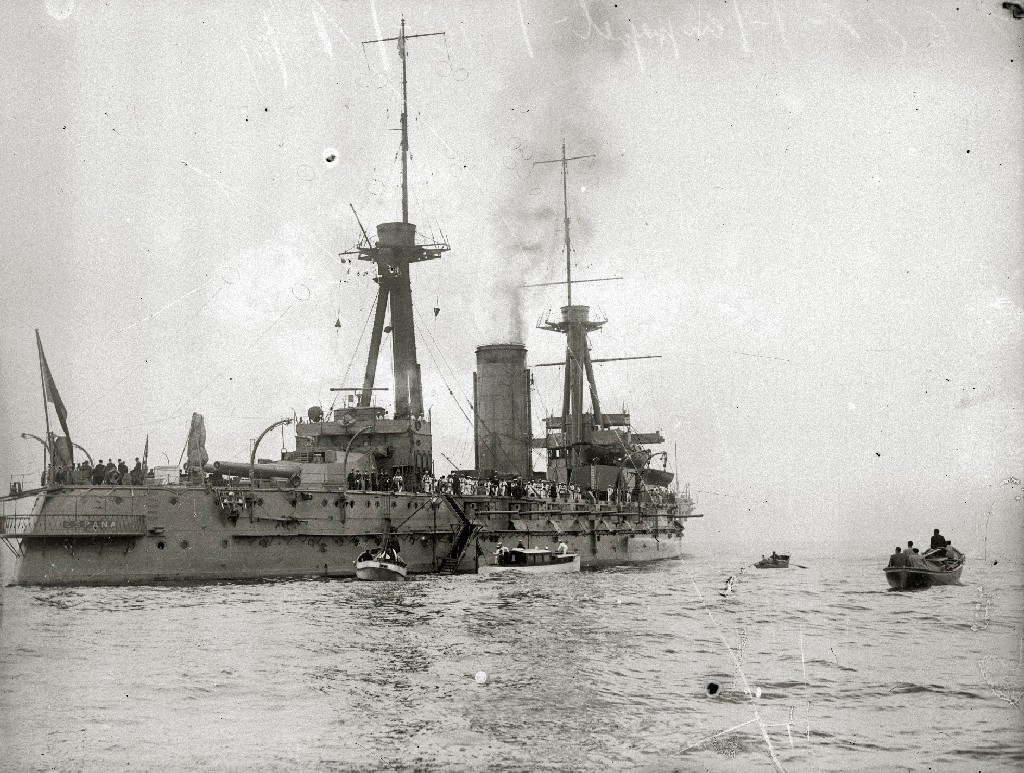
España battleship, the first ship of the España-class battleship, which entered on active service in 1913.

After the First Moroccan Crisis (which was decided at the Algeciras Conference in 1906) strengthened Spain's ties with Britain and France and public support for rearmament increased afterwards, the Spanish government reached an agreement with those two powers. for a mutual defense plan, which are the aforementioned Cartagena Agreements of 1907. In exchange for British and French support for the defense of Spain, the Spanish fleet would support the French Navy in case of war with the Triple Alliance against the combined fleets of the Kingdom of Italy and Austria-Hungary in the Mediterranean Sea since the Royal Navy should focus on the North Sea against the Imperial German Navy; and the French fleet alone could not contain the Italian and Austro-Hungarian fleets together and it was necessary for France to transport its colonial troops from North Africa to the European continent.

With the transfer of technology from the United Kingdom, the Spanish government was able to build the España-class battleship and designed the Reina Victoria Eugenia-class battleship that were canceled due to the start of the First World War.

Later, when the Great War broke out in 1914, the Italian government declared its neutrality. As the Pact of Cartagena was signed in part in the face of the danger of the combined strength of the Austro-Hungarian and Italian navies, the Spanish government had political room to also declare its neutrality in the conflict. Spain remained neutral throughout the war, while Italy later joined the Entente.

== See also ==
- International relations (1814–1919)
- Mediterranean Agreements
- Causes of World War I
- Diplomatic history of World War I

== Sources ==
- Cunningham, Charles H. (1917). "Spain and the War". The American Political Science Review. 11 (3): 421–47. doi:10.2307/1944246. JSTOR 1944246.
- Langer, William L. (1937). "Tribulations of Empire: The Mediterranean Problem". Foreign Affairs. 15 (4): 646–60. doi:10.2307/20028808. JSTOR 20028808.
- Rosas Ledezma, Enrique (1981). "Las "Declaraciones de Cartagena" (1907): significación en la política exterior de España y repercusiones internacionales". Cuadernos de Historia moderna y contemporánea. 2: 213–30.
- Rodríguez González, Agustín Ramón (2018). "The Battleship Alfonso XIII (1913)". In Taylor, Bruce (ed.). The World of the Battleship: The Lives and Careers of Twenty-One Capital Ships of the World's Navies, 1880–1990. Barnsley: Seaforth Publishing. pp. 268–289. ISBN 978-0-87021-906-1.
