= First Moroccan Crisis =

1905-06 disagreement between France, Germany, and Britain over control of Morocco

Tangier Crisis
- Part of the causes of World War I
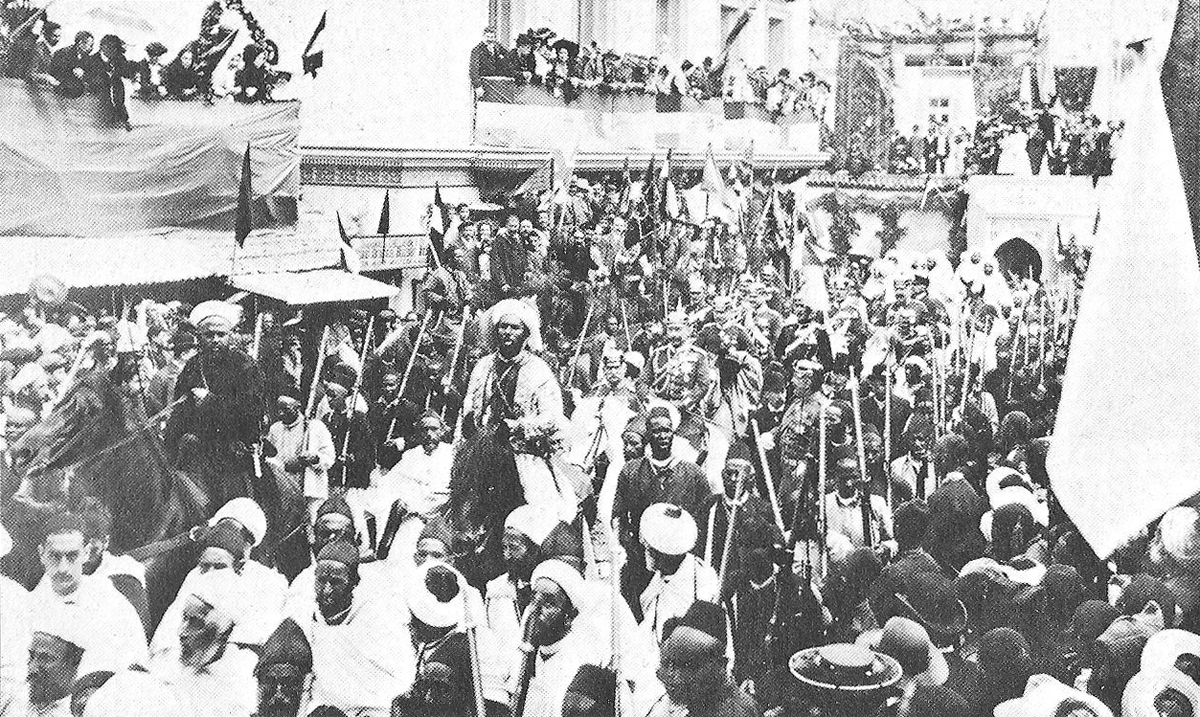
- Kaiser Wilhelm parades through Tangier escorted by the Black Guard.
Date	31 March 1905 – 7 April 1906 (1 year and 1 week)
Location	Tangier, Morocco
Result	Treaty of Algeciras

Belligerents
France; United Kingdom	Germany

Commanders and leaders
(French Third Republic) Théophile Delcassé	(German Empire) Wilhelm II

The First Moroccan Crisis or the Tangier Crisis was an international crisis between March 31, 1905, and April 7, 1906, over the status of Morocco. Germany wanted to challenge France's growing control over Morocco, aggravating France and Great Britain. The crisis was resolved by the Algeciras Conference of 1906, a conference of mostly European countries that affirmed French control; this worsened German relations with both France and Britain and helped enhance the new Anglo-French Entente.

== Kaiser's visit ==
On 31 March 1905 Kaiser Wilhelm II of Germany arrived at Tangier, Morocco and conferred with representatives of Sultan Abdelaziz of Morocco. The Kaiser toured the city on the back of a white horse. In a speech given at the German legation, the Kaiser declared he had come to support the sovereignty of the Sultan—a statement which amounted to a provocative challenge to French influence in Morocco. The Sultan subsequently rejected a set of French-proposed governmental reforms and issued invitations to major world powers to a conference which would advise him on necessary reforms.

== French response ==
Germany sought a multilateral conference where the French could be called to account before other European powers. The French foreign minister, Théophile Delcassé, took a defiant line, holding that there was no need for such a conference. In response, Count Bernhard von Bülow, the German Chancellor, threatened war over the issue, although this was a bluff. Kaiser Wilhelm did not want war, stating in Bremen just before he set off: "My study of history hasn't encouraged me to strive for world domination. In the empire of which I dream, the German emperor will be trusted by other countries and must be seen as a honest and peaceful neighbour". The crisis peaked in mid-June. The French cancelled all military leave (15 June) and Germany threatened to sign a defensive alliance with the Sultan (22 June). French Prime Minister Maurice Rouvier refused to risk war with Germany over the issue. Delcassé resigned, as the French government would no longer support his policy. On 1 July France agreed to attend the conference.

The crisis continued up to the eve of the conference at Algeciras, with Germany calling up reserve units (30 December) and France moving troops to the German border (3 January).

=== Algeciras Conference ===
The Algeciras Conference, lasting from 16 January to 7 April 1906, was called to settle the dispute. Of the 13 nations present, the German representatives found that their only supporter was Austria-Hungary. A German attempt at compromise was rejected by all but Austria-Hungary. France had firm support from Britain, Russia, Italy, Spain, and the United States. The Germans decided to accept a face-saving compromise agreement that was signed on 31 March 1906.

== Consequence ==
Although the Algeciras Conference temporarily solved the First Moroccan Crisis, it only worsened the tensions between the Triple Alliance and Triple Entente that ultimately led to the First World War.

The First Moroccan Crisis also showed that the Entente Cordiale was strong, as Britain had defended France in the crisis. The crisis can be seen as a reason for the Anglo-Russian Entente and the Anglo-Franco-Spanish Pact of Cartagena being signed the following year. Kaiser Wilhelm II was angry at being humiliated and was determined not to back down again, which led to the German involvement in the Second Moroccan Crisis.

== See also ==
- Perdicaris affair
- Agadir Crisis
