= Reina Victoria Eugenia-class battleship =

Spanish Navy's Reina Victoria Eugenia class dreadnoughts

Class overview
- Name: Reina Victoria Eugenia
- Preceded by: España class
- Succeeded by: None
- Planned: 3
- Canceled: 3

General characteristics
- Displacement: 21,000 long tons (21,337 t)
- Propulsion: 4 × steam turbines; 4 × screw propellers
- Speed: 21 knots (39 km/h)
- Armament: 8 × 13.5 in (343 mm) guns; 20 × 6 in (152 mm) guns

The Reina Victoria Eugenia class was a class of three dreadnought battleships of the Spanish Navy authorized as the Plan de la Segunda Escuadra under the Navy Law of 1913. The class, as well as the lead ship, were named for King Alfonso XIII's English queen consort, Victoria Eugenie of Battenberg. The other two ships were classified as "B" and "C". It was supposed to be designed by Vickers-Armstrongs, and built by John Brown. The ships were never built due to Britain's involvement in World War I, which halted all foreign projects being constructed in British yards.

== Background ==
Illustration of an España-class battleship by Oscar Parkes

Following disastrous losses in the Spanish–American War of 1898, Spain lacked the money to rebuild its navy, though the naval command made repeated requests for funding to begin reconstruction. The first two attempts, the Fleet Plan of 1903 and the Fleet Plan of 1905, both failed to secure parliamentary funding. Shortly thereafter, developments abroad spurred support to begin rebuilding the fleet. German expansionism had prompted Britain and France to come to the Entente Cordiale, putting aside their traditional rivalry to oppose Germany. The agreement directly affected Spain, since it settled matters of control over Morocco and placed Tangier under joint British–French–Spanish control. The agreement had the effect of bringing Spain closer with Britain and France, leading to an exchange of notes between the three governments in May 1907 that underlined an informal mutual defense agreement. The notes created the framework to contain the German-led Central Powers, whereby Britain would concentrate the bulk of its Royal Navy in the North Sea while Spain would contribute its fleet to support the French Navy against the combined fleets of Italy and Austria-Hungary.

By that time, a new government led by Antonio Maura was in power, prompting the Navy to try again with the Fleet Plan of 1907; this was passed by the legislature early the following year as the Navy Law of 7 January 1908. It authorized three new battleships, which became the España class, consisting of the ships España, Alfonso XIII, and Jaime I, along with supporting destroyers and torpedo boats. The battleships were constrained by the size of existing Spanish harbor facilities to around 15,000 long tons (15,241 t), since the government lacked the funding to dredge harbors and enlarge dry docks to accept larger vessels.

The delay enabled Spain to take advantage of experience gained by Britain with the world's first commissioned all-big-gun battleship, HMS Dreadnought, along with those of other major naval powers that had already built their own "dreadnoughts". As the Navy had little experience designing capital ships, it issued a set of specifications for the battleships and requested proposals from foreign shipbuilders, securing tenders from British, French, Italian, and Austro-Hungarian shipyards. The Navy then took the best characteristics from each submission and made its own improvements before awarding the contract to Sociedad Española de Construcción Naval (SECN), a consortium created by three of the British firms—Armstrong Whitworth, Vickers, and John Brown & Company. In addition to the contracts for the ships themselves, SECN was also contracted to build the shipyard in Ferrol, Spain that would in turn build the ships.

The repeated delays in the Spanish naval reconstruction program proved to be a detriment as well, since the Españas were rapidly surpassed by foreign vessels, most notably the so-called "super-dreadnoughts". By 1912, the need for additional battleships had become apparent, and Prime Minister José Canalejas pushed for a new law authorizing another group of three ships. After Canelejas was assassinated later that year, his successor, Álvaro de Figueroa and the naval minister, Amalio Gimeno, secured passage of the Plan de la Segunda Escuadra (Second Squadron Plan). The plan projected a second squadron of three 21,000-long-ton (21,337 t) dreadnoughts to supplement the España class, along with a pair of scout cruisers, nine destroyers, and three submarines. These dreadnoughts were named the Reina Victoria Eugenia class. They were to be in laid down in 1914 and 1915 and completed around 1920.

== Design history ==
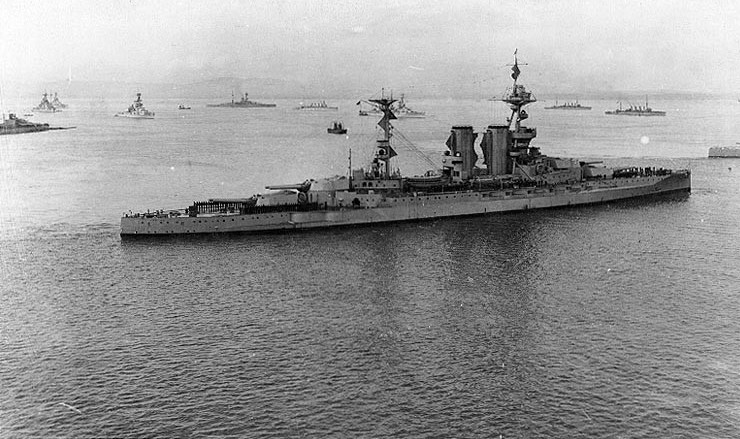
The British battleship HMS Barham; Robert Gardiner and Randal Gray suggest that the Reina Victoria Eugenia class would have resembled this sort of British vessel

The class consisted of three ships, Reina Victoria Eugenia, the lead ship, and two others referred to only by the temporary names B and C. The lead ship was named after King Alfonso's British wife. They were designed by SECN and were initially planned to displace 21,000 long tons (21,337 t) with a speed of 21 knots (39 km/h; 24 mph). Early plans for the type called for an armament of eight 15-inch (381 mm) guns in four twin-gun turrets; however, financial difficulties resulted in the selection of an armament of eight 13.5-inch (343 mm) guns instead, which still would have had a longer range than most contemporary ships. The secondary armament would have been twenty 6-inch (152 mm) guns. The propulsion system was to consist of four Parsons steam turbines, driving four screw propellers; speed was to be around 21 knots (39 km/h; 24 mph). Other specifications of the ships were either never decided upon or have not survived, although according to the naval historians Robert Gardiner and Randal Gray, it is probable that they would have had an arrangement similar to British battleships of the period, with two pairs of superfiring turrets, one forward and one aft, with two closely spaced funnels.

The design staff preferred 15-inch (381 mm) guns, and by 1914, Eduardo Dato had become prime minister. He and his naval minister, Admiral Augusto Miranda, authorized a revision of the design upward to accept the larger guns, which necessitated an increase to at least 25,000 long tons (25,000 t). As with the España-class battleships, the guns, armor plate, and fire-control systems for which were manufactured in Britain, significant technical assistance from the British would have been required. The start of World War I in July 1914 threw the Spanish plans into disarray; after Italy declared neutrality, Spain followed suit, since her fleet was unnecessary for France to contain the Austro-Hungarians by itself. With the strategic need for the new battleships removed, Miranda immediately decided to reduce the construction program to focus on cruisers, destroyers, and submarines, since they were cheaper alternatives to a large fleet of battleships. Miranda's revised program was passed by the legislature as the Navy Law of 30 July 1914. After the war, the navy considered another major construction program centered on four battlecruisers that would have displaced around 30,000 long tons (30,481 t), but it was deemed to have been too ambitious and the plan was not formally proposed to parliament.

== See also ==
- List of battleships of Spain
