= Spanish cruiser Príncipe Alfonso =

Almirante Cervera-class light cruiser of 1927–1970

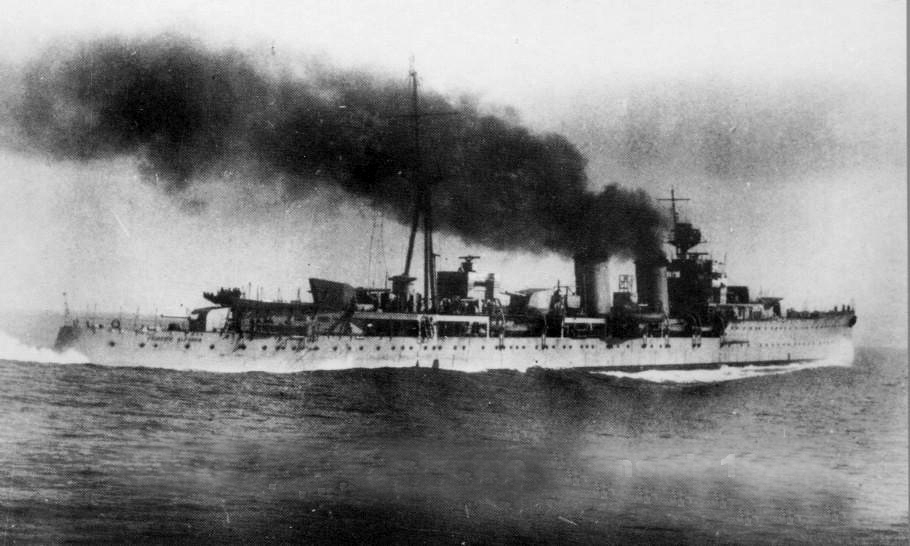
- Príncipe Alfonso on sea trials in September 1927.

History

Spain
- Name: Príncipe Alfonso
- Namesake: Alfonso, Prince of Asturias (1907–1938)
- Ordered: 11 July 1922 (authorized)
- Builder: SECN, Ferrol, Spain
- Laid down: 24 November 1922
- Launched: 23 January 1925
- Commissioned: 20 September 1927
- Renamed: Libertad, April 1931
- Namesake: Liberty
- Renamed: Galicia, April 1939
- Namesake: Galicia, a region of Spain
- Decommissioned: June 1940
- Refit: June 1940–July 1944
- Recommissioned: 13 or 23 December 1944 (see text)
- Decommissioned: 1 July 1964 or 9 January 1970 (see text)
- Fate: Scrapped 1970

General characteristics
- Class & type: Almirante Cervera-class cruiser
- Displacement: As built: 7,475 long tons (7,595 t) standard; 9,237 long tons (9,385 t) full load; 1944: 8,051 long tons (8,180 t) standard; 9,748 long tons (9,904 t) full load
- Length: 176.6 m (579 ft 5 in)
- Beam: 16.6 m (54 ft 6 in)
- Draught: 5.03 m (16 ft 6 in)
- Depth: 9.3 m (30 ft 6 in)
- Installed power: 8 Yarrow-type boilers, 83,000 hp (61,893 kW)
- Propulsion: Parsons geared turbines, 4 shafts
- Speed: 33 knots (61 km/h; 38 mph)
- Complement: As built: 566; 1944: 603
- Armament: As built; 8 × 152 mm (6 in) Vickers-Carraca guns in 3 twin turrets and 2 single mountings; 4 × 102 mm (4 in) AA guns; 2 × 47 mm (1.9 in) Hotchkiss 3-pdr light AA guns; 12 × 533 mm (21 in) torpedo tubes in 4 triple mounts; 1 x 76 mm (3 in) gun (for disembarkation in boats); 1944: 8 × 152 mm (6 in) Vickers-Carraca guns in 4 twin turrets; 16 × 37 mm (1.5 in) guns in 8 twin mounts; 20 × 20 mm AA guns in 5 quadruple mounts; 6 × 533 mm (21 in) torpedo tubes; 1 × depth charge rack
- Armour: Belt 75–50 mm (3–2 in); Deck 50–25 mm (2–1 in); Conning tower 152 mm (6 in)

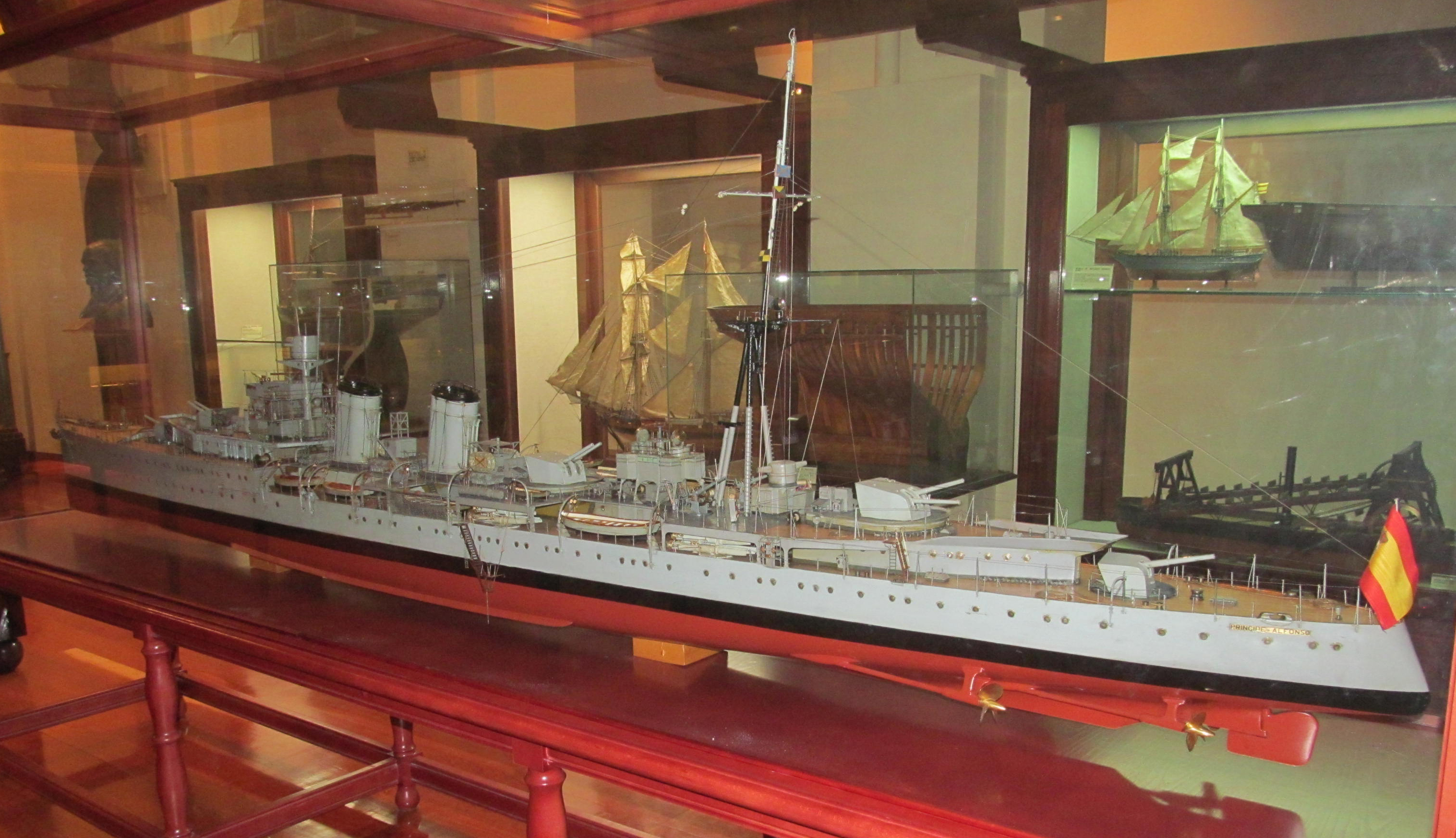
A model of Príncipe Alfonso, later renamed Libertad and Galicia, at the Naval Museum of Madrid on 4 January 2014.

Príncipe Alfonso was a Spanish Navy light cruiser commissioned in 1927. She was the lead ship of the Almirante Cervera class. After initial service under the Kingdom of Spain, she came under the control of the Second Spanish Republic when it was proclaimed in 1931 and was renamed Libertad, subsequently serving in the Spanish Republican Navy and seeing combat in the Revolution of 1934. During the Spanish Civil War (1936–1939), she fought on the Republican side and was the flagship of the Spanish Republican Navy. She was very active during the conflict, participating in both the Battle of Cape Cherchell in 1937 and the Battle of Cape Palos in 1938. After the Nationalist victory in the war, she came under the control of Francoist Spain and was renamed Galicia in 1939. She subsequently supported Spanish operations in the Ifni War of 1957–1958. She was decommissioned in either 1964 or 1970 and was scrapped in 1970.

As Principe Alfonso, the ship was named for Alfonso, Prince of Asturias (1907–1938), the heir apparent to the Spanish throne. As Libertad, she was named for the concept of liberty. As Galicia, she was named for Galicia, a region of Spain.

== Construction and commissioning ==
Spain's naval law of 1915 expired in December 1921 without all of its funds having been spent. To continue the construction of ships for the Spanish Navy, the minister of the navy promoted a new law on 11 January 1922. Under it, a royal decree of 11 July 1922 authorized the construction of the Almirante Cervera-class light cruisers Príncipe Alfonso and Almirante Cervera. The keels of both ships were laid on 24 November 1922 at the shipyard of the Sociedad Española de Construcción Naval (SECN, the Spanish Naval Construction Society) in Ferrol, Spain, and both ships were launched on 23 January 1925. Príncipe Alfonso began her sea trials in September 1927, after which she was commissioned into the Spanish Navy on 20 September 1927.

== Design and characteristics ==
SECN was founded in 1908, with a majority of its shares owned by the British firms John Brown and Vickers-Armstrongs, and its technical staff was entirely British until 1925. Unsurprisingly, this led to a heavy British influence on the design of Spanish Navy ships built at SECN, particularly in SECN's Ferrol shipyard, with most Spanish ship designs derived from ships built for the Royal Navy. British influences were evident in the design of the two Almirante Cervera-class light cruisers, which were based on the Royal Navy's Emerald class. Following a design by the British naval architect Sir Philip Watts, the technical director of Armstrong, the ships were very similar in dimensions to the Emerald class, but differed internally and externally in numerous details.

Príncipe Alfonso had a standard displacement of 7,975 tons, and at full load she displaced 9,330 tons. She was 176.6 metres (579 ft 5 in) long and had a beam of 16.6 metres (54 ft 6 in), a depth of 9.3 metres (30 ft 6 in), and a draft of 5.03 metres (16 ft 6 in). Her complement consisted of 566 men.

Príncipe Alfonso′s propulsion system consisted of eight oil-fired Yarrow boilers and four Parsons turbine sets generating 83,000 horsepower (61,893 kilowatts) and driving four screws. She could reach a speed of 34.4 knots (63.7 km/h; 39.6 mph) and had a range of 5,000 nautical miles (9,260 km; 5,750 mi) at 15 knots (27.8 km/h; 17.3 mph). Her belt armor varied in thickness from 50 to 75 millimetres (2 to 3 inches) and her deck armor was 25 millimetres (1 inch) thick.

Príncipe Alfonso′s main battery consisted of eight Vickers 152-millimetre (6-inch) guns in five mounts, with a single mount forward, three twin mounts amidships, and a single mount aft. Her armament also included four 102-millimetre (4-inch) anti-aircraft guns located between her second funnel and her aft mast, with two on each side, as well as two 47-millimetre (1.9-inch) anti-aircraft mounts, one machine gun, and twelve 533-millimetre (21-inch) torpedo tubes in four triple mounts. She also carried a 76-millimetre (3-inch) gun for use in her boats during amphibious landings.

== Service history ==
=== Kingdom of Spain ===
On 12 October 1927 Príncipe Alfonso got underway from Ferrol bound for Barcelona, where King Alfonso XIII boarded her for a cruise in the Mediterranean Sea. Departing Barcelona on 1 November 1927, she visited Naples in Italy, where the king attended the wedding of Princess Anne of Orléans to Prince Amedeo, Duke of Aosta and Duke of Apulia, on 5 November. Departing Naples, Príncipe Alfonso called at Malta, Bizerte in Tunisia, Cagliari on Sardinia, Mahón on Menorca in the Balearic Islands, Cartagena, and Alicante, where the king disembarked on 13 November 1927.

By January 1928, Príncipe Alfonso had returned to Ferrol. At the beginning of June 1928, she departed Ferrol to conduct exercises off Marín. She returned to Ferrol after completing the exercises, then proceeded to Gijón, where she received her battle flag, embroidered by the ladies of Asturias, in a ceremony that took place in El Musel on 12 July 1928. In the summer of 1928, with King Alfonso XIII aboard, she was present with other ships in Santander Bay for the reception and courtesy visit of the French Navy's Atlantic Squadron under Admiral Docteur. On 28 August 1928, Príncipe Alfonso departed Ferrol for gunnery exercises at Marín, then on 5 September 1928 got underway from Marín and proceeded to Bilbao.

King Alfonso XIII boarded Príncipe Alfonso at Bilbao in September 1928 to make an official visit to Sweden. Príncipe Alfonso departed Bilbao on 10 September 1928 and stopped first in Germany to visit the Reichsmarine at Kiel, where Alfonso XIII met with the head of the German naval command, Vizeadmiral (Vice Admiral) Erich Raeder; the commander of the Kiel naval base, Vizeadmiral (Vice Admiral) Iwan Oldekop; the acting commander of the German fleet command, Konteradmiral (Counter Admiral) Woelping von Ditter, and the chief of the German intelligence service, Kapitän zur See (Captain at Sea) Wilhelm Canaris The king also visited the battleship Schleswig-Holstein. Príncipe Alfonso then called at Stockholm, which she reached on 13 September, and Gothenburg. On 19 September she departed Sweden for a visit to Skagen in Denmark. She then called at ports in Scotland and at Plymouth before returning to Spain at Ferrol, which she reached on 28 or 30 September, according to different sources. After refueling, she got back underway the next day, stopped at Almería, and then put to sea again on 4 October 1928 bound for Cartagena.

King Alfonso XIII again boarded Príncipe Alfonso in October 1928 to observe Spanish Navy maneuvers in the Mediterranean Sea. On 27 October Príncipe Alfonso, Almirante Cervera (which served as flagship), the battleships Alfonso XIII and Jaime I, the light cruiser Méndez Núñez, the destroyers Alsedo, Lazaga, Sánchez Barcáiztegui, and Velasco, the seaplane carrier Dédalo, and other ships anchored at Palma de Mallorca on Mallorca in the Balearic Islands. After conducting maneuvers, the ships of the squadron returned to Palma de Mallorca at various times on the afternoon of 4 November and the morning of 5 November 1928. Príncipe Alfonso arrived on 6 November with the king on board. On the morning of 13 November 1928, Príncipe Alfonso arrived at Cartagena, where the king disembarked. After refueling at Algeciras, Príncipe Alfonso, Alfonso XIII, Jaime I, Almirante Cervera, Méndez Núñez, and the light cruiser Blas de Lezo arrived at Ferrol at the end of November 1928.

The ships departed Ferrol in January 1929, refueled at Almería on 13 January, and then conducted a cruise in the Mediterranean. They called at Valencia from 2 to 20 February 1929, then proceeded to Cartagena. On the morning of 13 March 1929, Príncipe Alfonso, Blas de Lezo, and Méndez Núñez put to sea from Vigo to conduct maneuvers on the open ocean. The three cruisers called at Cádiz from 9 to 17 April 1929, then steamed north for gunnery practice at the end of April 1929. In mid-May 1929, Príncipe Alfonso, Alfonso XIII, Jaime I (serving as squadron flagship), Blas de Lezo, Méndez Núñez, Alsedo, Lazaga, Sánchez Barcáiztegui, and Velasco attended the 1929 Barcelona International Exposition at Barcelona, where their crews took part in ceremonies, banquets, parades, and visits. The Spanish squadron left Barcelona on 1 June 1929. The two battleships and the three light cruisers arrived at Alcúdia on Mallorca in the Balearic Islands on 17 June and later visited Palma de Mallorca. The ships stopped at Valencia in early July 1929, where they rendezvoused with Almirante Cervera. Both battleships and all four cruisers reached Ferrol on 9 July 1929.

After refueling, the four cruisers departed Ferrol on 13 July 1929 bound for Santander. King Alfonso XIII and Prince Juan, Count of Barcelona, boarded Príncipe Alfonso there on 20 August 1929, and subsequently observed naval maneuvers in the Bay of Biscay off Santander involving the four cruisers as well as destroyers, submarines, torpedo boats, and other, smaller vessels, with Príncipe Alfonso serving as squadron flagship. In the autumn of 1929, Príncipe Alfonso took part in maneuvers in the Mediterranean Sea as part of a squadron that also included Alfonso XIII, Jaime I, Blas de Lezo, Méndez Núñez, and four destroyers. After their conclusion, King Alfonso XIII presided over a naval review involving the squadron on 15 October. The squadron returned to Ferrol on 25 October 1929.

Príncipe Alfonso conducted maneuvers with Alfonso XIII, Jaime I, Almirante Cervera, Blas de Lezo, Méndez Núñez, Alsedo, Lazaga, Sánchez Barcáiztegui, Velasco, and the destroyers Almirante Ferrándiz, and José Luis Díez in the Pontevedra estuary during the first half of June 1930, after which the ships put into port at Ferrol. In July 1930, Príncipe Alfonso, Almirante Cervera, Blas de Lezo, Méndez Núñez, the light cruisers Miguel de Cervantes and Reina Victoria Eugenia, destroyers, and submarines carried out exercises in the Bay of Biscay between Cape Ortegal and the coast of France. The ships repeated the maneuvers and exercises in September 1930, culminating in a parade before King Alfonso XIII on 20 September.

Príncipe Alfonso's commanding officer died in a hospital on 22 September 1930. After a new commanding officer reported aboard, the Spanish crown prince, Alfonso, Prince of Asturias, embarked aboard Príncipe Alfonso, and she departed Ferrol with the rest of the squadron on 25 September 1930. On 26 September, the squadron arrived at San Fernando, where Prince Alfonso swore allegiance to the flag of Spain at the Naval Military Academy. Príncipe Alfonso then separated from the squadron to conduct a cruise in the Mediterranean Sea that took her to Algeciras, Málaga, Almería, Cartagena, Valencia, and Barcelona, where Prince Alfonso disembarked. Príncipe Alfonso then proceeded to Cartagena, which she reached on 30 September 1930. She rejoined the squadron, and as part of it undertook a long cruise in the Mediterranean Sea, returning to Ferrol at the end of December 1930. On 31 December 1930, Príncipe Alfonso arrived at Ferrol and entered the shipyard for repairs.

After completion of her repairs, Príncipe Alfonso was scheduled to get underway from Ferrol on 6 February 1931 and proceed to Cartagena, but instead she received orders to wait until Almirante Cervera and Miguel de Cervantes could join her at Ferrol. While awaiting them, she departed Ferrol on 13 February for a voyage to Bilbao and returned to Ferrol on 27 February. After Almirante Cervera and Miguel de Cervantes arrived at Ferrol from Valencia, the three light cruisers got underway for a cruise on 9 March 1931. They called at Cádiz on 10 March and again from 13 to 20 March, then departed for a voyage to Palma de Mallorca. They arrived at Barcelona along with Alfonso XIII and Jaime I on 29 March. The five ships called at Tarragona from 5 to 12 April 1931, when they headed for Valencia.

When the Second Spanish Republic was proclaimed on 14 April 1931, King Alfonso XIII chose Príncipe Alfonso to carry him into exile in France early on 14 April 1931. With him aboard, Príncipe Alfonso departed Cartagena on 15 April and steamed to Gibraltar, where she picked up Prince Juan on 16 April. She then proceeded to Marseille to disembark the passengers on 16 April 1931.

=== Second Spanish Republic ===
When Príncipe Alfonso left French waters to return to Cartagena, she raised the tricolor flag of the Second Spanish Republic and became part of the Spanish Republican Navy. She arrived at Cartagena on 17 April 1931, and shortly afterward was renamed Libertad (Liberty). One of her first missions under this new name was the transportation of Generale (General) José Sanjurjo to Ceuta on the coast of North Africa on 24 April 1931. In the first week of August 1931, Libertad, Almirante Cervera, Blas de Lezo, Méndez Núñez, Miguel de Cervantes, and the light cruiser República (ex-Reina Victoria Eugenia) arrived in Bilbao in company with eight destroyers and 10 submarines. Under a reorganization of the Spanish Navy, all battleships and cruisers were assigned to the 1st Division.

On 9 May 1932, Libertad, Almirante Cervera, Blas de Lezo, Méndez Núñez, Miguel de Cervantes, and República departed Ferrol and proceeded to A Coruña for an official visit. Libertad and Almirante Cervera remained behind at A Coruña while Blas de Lezo, Méndez Núñez, Miguel de Cervantes, and República separated from them on 14 May 1932 to make a voyage to Vigo. In July 1932, Libertad participated in maneuvers in the waters off Galicia, during which Blas de Lezo struck an uncharted rock and sank on 11 July 1932.

Libertad, Almirante Cervera, Miguel de Cervantes, Dédalo, ten destroyers, six submarines, two torpedo boats, other smaller and auxiliary vessels, three Dornier seaplanes, and three Savoia seaplanes conducted maneuvers in the Mediterranean Sea in the summer of 1933. Between mid-April and June 1934, Libertad took part in the Spanish fleet's general maneuvers in the Mediterranean Sea, including the waters of the Balearic Islands. Jaime I, Almirante Cervera, Miguel de Cervantes, República, eight destroyers, eight submarines, and other, smaller vessels also participated. At the end of the maneuvers, the ships passed in review before the President of the Republic, Niceto Alcalá-Zamora, the Minister of the Navy, Juan José Rocha García, and other dignitaries on 11 June 1934.

In October 1934, the fleet moved from Cartagena to Barcelona. On 5 October 1934, the Revolution of 1934 broke out in northern Spain, and Libertad, Almirante Cervera, and Miguel de Cervantes transported Spanish Army troops from Ferrol and A Coruña to El Musel, where their landing parties joined the troops in putting down the rebellion. Libertad got underway on 6 October 1934 with the 29th Infantry Regiment aboard, landing the troops on 7 October at Gijón, where she also shelled the Cimadevilla district of the city. On 8 October, Libertad, Almirante Cervera, and the battleship Jaime I bombarded both the Cimadevilla area and Santa Catalina Hill. On 10 October 1934, Libertad anchored at El Musel.

During 1935, Libertad participated in several gunnery exercises at the Marín firing range and in "naval weeks" held at Cartagena and Santander to honor the Spanish Navy. In the spring of 1936, she took part in naval exercises in the Canary Islands. She served as a flagship during the exercises, which also included Jaime I, Almirante Cervera, Méndez Núñez, Miguel de Cervantes, eight destroyers, six submarines, and other smaller and auxiliary vessels. The exercises concluded on 13 May 1936.

=== Spanish Civil War ===
A coup of 17 July 1936 which attempted to overthrow the Republican government triggered the start of the Spanish Civil War. Libertad was at Ferrol and received orders from the Republican government to proceed in company with Jaime I and Miguel de Cervantes to Cádiz. The officers of the three warships were sympathetic to the rebel Nationalist faction but were undecided about what to do, and the commanding officers of Libertad and Miguel de Cervantes delayed the ships' departure for as long as they could. The ships finally began their voyage later on 17 July. They received orders from the Republican government early on 18 July to head for the Strait of Gibraltar. When on the afternoon of 19 July the ships received orders to bombard Nationalist forces at Cádiz, Libertad's commanding officer refused, offering several excuses, and the crew mutinied and took control of Libertad at 15:00. The crews of Jaime I and Miguel de Cervantes also seized control of their ships. Most of the officers aboard all three ships were placed under arrest. While Libertad waited to be refueled near Rota, aircraft of the Aviación Nacional (the Nationalist faction's air force) attacked her.

The ships arrived at Tangier on the coast of North Africa on the night of 19–20 July 1936, following orders to concentrate there and institute a blockade of the Strait of Gibraltar to prevent Nationalist forces in Spanish Morocco from reaching Spain. On 20 July 1936 Libertad and several destroyers bombarded Ceuta, and on 22 July Libertad, Miguel de Cervantes, and destroyers bombarded Algeciras and La Línea de la Concepción. Libertad and Miguel de Cervantes again bombarded Ceuta on 25 July and Melilla, also on the coast of North Africa, on 26 July. After the Committee of Control of the Tangier International Zone forced the Republican fleet to abandon Tangier, Málaga became its new base for maintaining the blockade of the Strait of Gibraltar.

After a Nationalist convoy succeeded in passing through the Strait of Gibraltar on 5 August 1936, Libertad bombarded Algeciras, Punta Carnero, and Tarifa. By order of the ships' committees, eight officers from Libertad and five from the gunboat Laya were executed by firing squad early on the morning of 3 August 1936 to eliminate any chance of them seizing control of their ships on behalf of the Nationalists. A few days later Libertad's crew murdered her commanding officer, who was in the ship's sick bay. The men's bodies were thrown into the sea.

On 7 August 1936, Libertad and Jaime I bombarded the ports at Cádiz and Algeciras, sinking the Nationalist gunboat Dato at Algeciras. At the end of August, Libertad took part in a failed Republican attempt to capture Mallorca in the Balearic Islands from the Nationalists.

On 21 September 1936, Jaime I, Libertad, Miguel de Cervantes, and five destroyers got underway from Málaga to come to the aid of isolated Republican ground forces in northern Spain; according to one source they arrived at El Musel on 25 September, while another claims they did not begin their northward voyage from the vicinity of the Strait of Gibraltar until 26 September. The battleship and the two light cruisers bombarded Deva on 27 September and arrived at Santander the following day to resupply. The ships then went to Bilbao, where they remained practically inactive until 13 October 1936, when they got underway to return to Cartagena. During the return voyage, the Republican squadron crossed paths at night with the Nationalist heavy cruiser Canarias and light cruiser Almirante Cervera, but the two forces did not sight each other. After passing through the Strait of Gibraltar in darkness, Libertad arrived at Málaga on 18 October 1936.

Subsequently, Libertad undertook a series of short sorties in the Mediterranean Sea. One of these was on 25 October 1936, when she steamed toward the coast of Algeria with Miguel de Cervantes, Méndez Núñez, and a destroyer flotilla, returning to Cartagena on 26 October. Another took place on 16 December 1936, when she and several destroyers sortied to attack Melilla. At the beginning of 1937, she made numerous sorties from Cartagena to conduct escort, reconnaissance, and coastal bombardment operations.

Málaga fell to Nationalist forces in the Battle of Málaga of 3–8 February 1937. On 23 April 1937, Libertad, Jaime I, Méndez Núñez, and several destroyers bombarded Málaga. On 25 April, Sánchez Barcáiztegui came under attack by Nationalist cruisers while returning to Cartagena from a sortie, prompting Libertad and the other Republican cruisers to get underway to intercept the Nationalist ships, but without success. On 20 May 1937, the Republican squadron, with Libertad as its flagship, had a first, brief encounter with the Nationalist heavy cruiser Baleares, but Baleares managed to escape into the fog.

On 6 September 1937, Libertad, Méndez Núñez, and the destroyers Almirante Antequera, Almirante Miranda, Almirante Valdés, Escaño, Gravina, Jorge Juan, and Lepanto got underway from Cartagena to rendezvous with a convoy of four merchant ships in the Mediterranean Sea and escort it to Valencia. The warships met the merchant ships north of Algiers at 05:00 on 7 September. At 10:00 they sighted Baleares off Cape Cherchell on the coast of Algeria, about 30 nautical miles (56 km; 35 mi) north of Cherchell and about 30 nautical miles (56 km; 35 mi) west of Algiers. While the destroyers moved away to protect the merchant ships, Libertad and Méndez Núñez closed with Baleares, and the Battle of Cape Cherchell began when Baleares opened fire on them at 10:45. Méndez Núñez fell behind due to her lower speed, but Libertad pressed ahead and fought Baleares alone. Baleares scored a hit on Libertad, which sustained some damage, but Libertad found the range with her fifth salvo and hit Baleares twice, setting her on fire, before withdrawing. That same afternoon, the Republican ships again encountered Baleares, without either side suffering any further damage, while the destroyers and merchant ships turned around and headed for Cherchell. As the Republican cruisers withdrew towards Cartagena, aircraft of the Aviación Nacional and the Italian Aviazione Legionaria attacked them without significant results. Meanwhile, the destroyers and merchant ships reached Cherchell, although one source states that the merchant ships ran aground on the beaches of the North African coast and their cargoes were lost.

On the afternoon of 5 March 1938, a Republican squadron from Cartagena, consisting of Libertad (serving as squadron flagship), Méndez Núñez, Almirante Antequera, Gravina, Lazaga, Lepanto, and Sánchez Barcáiztegui sortied to attack the Nationalists on the Balearic Islands. The Nationalist heavy cruisers Canarias and Baleares got underway the same day from Palma de Mallorca in the Balearics to provide distant cover to two merchant ships making a voyage from Fascist Italy. The two squadrons encountered each other east of Cape Palos late on 5 March, and the Battle of Cape Palos began. The Republican destroyers launched torpedoes at the Nationalist ships without success and the two squadrons lost contact after passing one another. Sometime between 02:00 and 02:15 on 6 March, however, Baleares fired star shells, revealing her position. Libertad opened fire on her, scoring hits, and the Republican destroyers again launched torpedoes, two of which from Lepanto struck Baleares. The torpedoes caused Baleares′s forward ammunition magazine to explode, destroying her forward section and bridge. Baleares sank a few hours later with heavy loss of life, but the Republican squadron withdrew to Cartagena without capitalizing on its victory.

On 17 June 1938, Nationalist aircraft damaged Libertad while she was in port at Cartagena. She was repaired, but afterward was almost completely inactive for the remainder of the war.

On 5 March 1939, following a Nationalist uprising in Cartagena, Libertad departed Cartagena along with the bulk of the Republican squadron bound for Bizerte in Tunisia, where the squadron hoped to avoid capture by the Nationalists. According to one source, the ships were interned in Bizerte on 7 March; another claims they reached Bizerte on 11 March and that after their crew members requested political asylum on 12 March, the ships were interned under the custody of a few Spanish crew members per vessel. The rest of the crews were taken to an internment camp in the town of Meheri Zabbens.

As the Spanish Civil War came to a close, Nationalist personnel who were to take charge of the interned ships arrived in Bizerte under the overall command of Capitán de navío (Ship-of-the-Line Captain) Salvador Moreno Fernández aboard the transports Mallorca and Marqués de Comillas; sources disagree as to whether the Nationalists took control of the ships on 30 March or did not arrive at Bizerte until 31 March 1939. In either case, Libertad and the other ships were under Nationalist control when the war ended on 1 April 1939, resulting in a Nationalist victory and the establishment of Francoist Spain.

=== Francoist Spain ===
The former Republican ships left Bizerte on 2 April 1939, arrived at Algeciras on 5 April and reached Cádiz on 8 April. After her arrival in Spain, Libertad was renamed Galicia, for the Spanish region of that name.

In mid-1939, Galicia arrived at Ferrol del Caudillo (as Ferrol had been renamed in 1938) with Méndez Núñez, Miguel de Cervantes, Alsedo, and Lazaga. On 11 June 1940, the shipyard at Ferrol del Caudillo received orders to begin a major reconstruction and modernization of Galicia. During the work, everything but the ship's hull and funnels, was replaced. Her tripod mast was removed, her machinery was overhauled, and she received a new, more spacious bridge. Although her main battery remained eight 152-millimetre (6-inch) guns, they were remounted in four twin turrets. The rest of her armament was altered to sixteen 37-millimetre (1.5-inch) guns in eight twin mounts, twenty 20-millimetre anti-aircraft guns in five quadruple mounts, six torpedo tubes, and a depth charge rack. She emerged from the reconstruction with a displacement of 8,051 tons at standard load and 9,748 tons at full load and a crew of 603 men. She carried out her post-modernization sea trials in July 1944 and was delivered to the Spanish Navy. She participated in various maneuvers and ceremonial events, then officially was recommissioned on either 13 or 23 December 1944, according to different sources.

In her first years of service after her reconstruction, Galicia made numerous courtesy visits along the coast of Spain. With Vicealmirante (Vice Admiral) Salvador Moreno Fernández — who had been named Spain's ambassador extraordinary to Argentina for the inauguration of Juan Perón as President of Argentina — aboard, she departed Ferrol del Caudillo on 20 May 1946, stopped at Las Palmas on Gran Canaria in the Canary Islands, and arrived at Buenos Aires on 1 June 1946. Moreno attended the inauguration there on 4 June 1946. For the return trip to Spain, Galicia departed Buenos Aires on 18 June, stopped at Las Palmas on 2 July, and called at Tenerife in the Canary Islands from 4 to 6 July 1946 before proceeding to Galicia.

Galicia arrived at San Sebastián on the afternoon of 7 August 1946 with Minister of the Navy Francisco Regalado on board. The Spanish head of state, General Francisco Franco, embarked at San Sebastián and visited several ports along Spain's Cantabrian Sea coast aboard Galicia before he disembarked in Galicia. In mid-May 1947, Galicia, Almirante Cervera, and eight destroyers escorted Miguel de Cervantes as she transported Franco for a visit to Palma de Mallorca, where the ships arrived on 16 May, and Barcelona, which the ships reached on 18 May 1947.

On 20 May 1947, Minister of the Navy Regalado departed Barcelona aboard Galicia — escorted by the destroyers Churruca, Gravina, Lepanto, and Ulloa — bound for Mahón on Menorca in the Balearic Islands on an inspection visit. Regalado returned to Barcelona on the night of 22 May aboard Galicia, escorted by Churruca and Gravina. Galicia soon got underway from Barcelona again with Regalado aboard for another inspection trip to the Balearic Islands, this time to Palma de Mallorca. After Galicia returned Regalado to Barcelona on the afternoon of 29 May, Almirante Cervera and Miguel de Cervantes met her there, and the three light cruisers remained in Barcelona during a visit Franco made to the city. On 31 May, they departed for Ferrol del Caudillo, making stops in Cartagena and Cádiz along the day. The three light cruisers — with Almirante Cervera serving as the flagship of Vicealmirante (Vice Admiral) Salvador Moreno Fernández — arrived in Cartagena on 4 June 1947.

In July 1948, Galicia was part of a squadron under the command of Moreno, flying his flag aboard Canarias, that conducted maneuvers off the Atlantic coast of Spain. Almirante Cervera, Miguel de Cervantes, Almirante Antequera, Almirante Valdés, Ciscar, Jorge Juan, José Luis Díez, and Sánchez Barcáiztegui also participated. The squadron called at Vigo on 10 July, got back underway the same day, made a stop at A Coruña, and then arrived at Ferrol del Caudillo on 13 July 1948. Escorted by Jorge Juan and Sánchez Barcáiztegui, Galicia put to sea from San Sebastián on 14 September 1948 with Minister of the Navy Regalado aboard, bound for Marín, where the ships arrived at 19:30 on 16 September. The three ships then proceeded to Ferrol del Caudillo with Franco and Regalado aboard Galicia. As part of the Northern Squadron, which was under Moreno's command, Galicia, Canarias, Almirante Cervera, Miguel de Cervantes, a destroyer flotilla, and three submarines conducted maneuvers off the eastern coast of Spain before arriving at Cartagena on 11 November 1948.

In October 1949, Galicia, Canarias, Almirante Cervera, Miguel de Cervantes, and several destroyers formed a squadron which accompanied Franco during an official visit to Portugal. On 4 November 1949, the Northern Squadron under Moreno's command — consisting of Galicia, Almirante Cervera, Miguel de Cervantes, and six destroyers — made a stop at Cartagena before it proceeded to Palma de Mallorca, where it arrived on 12 November and rendezvoused with the Mediterranean Squadron. Both squadrons then came under Moreno's command. After the completion of its Mediterranean deployment, the Northern Squadron returned to Ferrol del Caudillo on 1 December 1949.

The Northern Squadron — consisting of Galicia, Canarias, Almirante Cervera, Miguel de Cervantes, Almirante Antequera, Almirante Valdés, Ciscar, Jorge Juan, José Luis Díez, and Sánchez Barcáiztegui — participated in maneuvers off Galicia in June 1950. It visited Bilbao in mid-June before conducting gunnery exercises at Marín. On 1 July 1950, the same ten ships steamed from Ferrol del Caudillo to Marín, where they remained until 22 July to celebrate the feast day of Our Lady of Mount Carmel. Galicia participated in Northern Squadron maneuvers between Cádiz and the Canary Islands in October 1950, then took part in a naval review in the Bay of Cádiz on 30 October 1950.

In May 1952, Galicia arrived at Barcelona for the 35th Eucharistic Congress, which was held there from 27 May to 1 June. In June 1953, she visited the United Kingdom to attend a naval review at Spithead in honor of the coronation of Queen Elizabeth II. After completing the Spanish Navy's general maneuvers of 1953, the Northern Squadron, with Galicia participating, conducted a naval parade, getting underway from Cádiz on the afternoon of 14 October 1953 and steaming toward Cape St. Vincent with Franco, the chief of staff of the fleet, and several government ministers observing from aboard the squadron flagship, Canarias.

Tensions arose between Spain and Morocco in 1956 over the status of Spanish West Africa on the Atlantic coast of North Africa. Galicia, Miguel de Cervantes, and the transport Almirante Lobo transported the newly created 13th Bandera ("Banner," a battalion-sized unit) of the Spanish Legion to El Aaiún to reinforce Spanish forces in Spanish West Africa. Galicia remained in the area as the Ifni War broke out in November 1957, with Spanish forces fighting those of Morocco and the Moroccan Army of Liberation. Galicia returned to Spain in February 1958.

In 1959, Galicia was stationed at Cartagena to serve as the flagship of the Naval Training Group.

== Decommissioning and disposal ==
Galicia was decommissioned on either 1 July 1964 or 9 January 1970, according to different sources. She subsequently was scrapped.
