= Spanish cruiser Miguel de Cervantes =

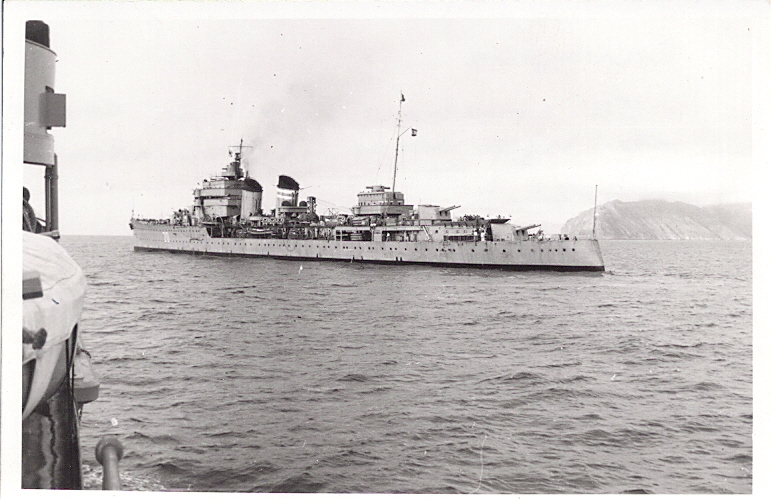
- Miguel de Cervantes in Cartagena, circa 1946

History

Spain
- Name: Miguel de Cervantes
- Namesake: Miguel de Cervantes Saavedra
- Builder: S.E.C.N in Ferrol
- Laid down: 27 August 1926
- Launched: 19 May 1928
- Commissioned: 10 February 1930
- Stricken: 1 July 1964
- Fate: Sold for scrap July 1964

General characteristics
- Class & type: Almirante Cervera-class cruiser
- Displacement: 9240 tons
- Length: 167.62 m (549.93 ft)
- Beam: 16.61 m (54.49 ft)
- Draft: 5.03 m (16.50 ft)
- Installed power: 80,000 shp (60,000 kW)
- Propulsion: 4 × Parsons turbines; 8 × Yarrow boilers; 4 × screws
- Speed: 35 knots (65 km/h; 40 mph)
- Range: 4,950 nmi (5,700 mi; 9,170 km) @ 15 kn (17 mph; 28 km/h)
- Armament: Original: 8 × Vickers 152 mm cannon; 4 × 101.6 mm AA cannon; 12 × 533 mm torpedo tubes; July 1936: 8 x Vickers-Carraca BL 152 mm cannon; 3 x Vickers 101.6 mm cannon; 2 x Vickers AA 47 mm cannon; 12 x 533 mm torpedo tubes; January 1937: 8 x Vickers-Carraca BL 152 mm cannon; 3 x Vickers 101.6 mm cannon; 1 x AA Hotchkiss 13.2 mm machine gun; 12 x 533 mm torpedo tubes; June 1938: 8 x Vickers-Carraca BL 152 mm cannon; 3 x Vickers 101.6 mm cannon; 1 x AA Vickers 76.2 mm cannon; 2 x AA Hotchkiss 25 mm cannon; 12 x 533 mm torpedo tubes; October 1938: 8 x Vickers-Carraca BL 152 mm cannon; 3 x Vickers 101.6 mm cannon; 1 x Bofors AA 40 mm cannon; 2 x AA Oerlikon 20 mm cannon; 12 x 533 mm torpedo tubes
- Notes: Could carry a Heinkel He 114 scout plane (after upgrades)

Miguel de Cervantes was an Almirante Cervera-class light cruiser that served in the Spanish Navy. She fought in the Spanish Civil War on the Republican side, before joining the post-war Spanish Navy. She was ordered by a Royal Decree on 31 March 1926, as part of a naval construction project headed by Counter Admiral Honorio Cornejo.

== Service ==
Miguel de Cervantes performed her trials at sea in December 1929, reaching a speed of 25 knots, three more than the Navy requirement. Along with her sister ship Almirante Cervera, she took part in the repression of the 1934 Asturias Revolution, shelling the neighborhood of Cimadevilla and, along with the battleship Jaime I, transporting troops and munitions to Gijón.

On 17 July 1936, Miguel de Cervantes and Libertad left Ferrol, having received orders to sail to the Strait of Gibraltar. When news about the rebellion reached the ships, the crews rebelled against their commanders before they could side with the Nationalists. The Republican squadron, consisting of Jaime I, Libertad, Miguel de Cervantes and seven Churruca-class destroyers met at the Tangier International Zone on 20 July and blockaded the Strait. On 22 July, the squadron bombarded La Línea de la Concepción, and Ceuta on 25 July. From that moment, the squadron used Málaga as its base to maintain the blockade. On 21 September, Miguel de Cervantes along with Jaime I and five destroyers left Málaga, and on 26 September abandoned the Strait of Gibraltar area in order to relieve Republican troops surrounded in Northern Spain. Once they returned to the Mediterranean, the ships established their base in Cartagena.

On 22 November 1936, Miguel de Cervantes was hit by torpedoes fired by the Italian submarine Evangelista Torricelli while anchored off the port of Cartagena. Despite suffering serious damage, she was towed to port. Due to an air attack, her repairs were delayed until 11 April 1938. On 5 March 1939, she left Cartagena along with most of the Republican Navy following the uprising in the city, reaching Bizerta on 11 March. The next day, the crews solicited political asylum in Tunisia. Most of the ship's crews were interned, with a few Spaniards left to guard the ships. The rest were transported to a concentration camp in Meheri Zabbens.

In 1949, she transported Francisco Franco to Lisbon. In May 1952 she transported Franco to Barcelona for the XXXV International Eucharistic Congress. Miguel de Cervantes was one of the ships used to land troops in the African coast during the Ifni War. She was stricken on 1 July 1964 and sold for scrap at public auction later that month, being purchased by to Joaquín Balsalobre Pedreño for a price of 31.680.000 pesetas.

== Bibliography ==
- García Flórez, Dionisio (2002). Buques de la Guerra Civil Española: Acorazados y Cruceros. Madrid: Almena Ediciones. ISBN 84-932284-3-5.
