= Cabo Quilates =

Spanish ship where prisoner massacres took place

History

Spain
- Name: Cabo Quilates
- Owner: Naviera Ybarra
- Awarded: 1927
- Builder: Compañía Euskalduna de Construcción y Reparación de buques

History

Basque Country
- Name: Ibai
- Owner: Basque Government
- Acquired: 1936

History

Soviet Union
- Name: Yenisei
- Owner: People's Commissariat for Water Transport; Ministry of the Maritime Fleet
- Acquired: 1936

History

Soviet Union
- Name: Baikal
- Owner: Ministry of the Maritime Fleet
- Acquired: 1936

Cabo Quilates was a ship for passengers and cargo built by Compañía Euskalduna de Construcción y Reparación de buques of Bilbao for Naviera Ybarra in 1927. In 1936, at the beginning of the Spanish Civil War, it was requisitioned as a prison ship.

== History ==
It was named after Cape Quilates in the Spanish protectorate in Morocco, now near Al Hoceima, Morocco.

On 25 September 1936, after the Nationalist air bombing of Bilbao, militias went to the Portu dock in Barakaldo at the Estuary of Bilbao where ships Cabo Quilates and Altuna Mendi held prisoners accused of siding with the Nationalists. The militias executed on the spot many of the prisoners. One of the dead was Fernando María de Ybarra, from the Ybarra family who had owned the ship.

Again on 2 October, Republican mariners from Spanish battleship Jaime I assaulted the prison ship. The Biscayan authorities ordered the battleship to leave the port of Bilbao and several of the attackers were also executed. The number of victims of both assaults varies across sources.

After this, the ship is requisitioned by the Basque Government as Ibai and travels to the Americas several times to bring provisions for the Republicans. At the end of the war, it is taken by the Soviet merchant fleet as Yenisei and later Baikal. After a fire, it is decommissioned.

After the war, a cross was built in Barakaldo remembering the victims. The Barakaldo authorities decided in 2020 to substitute the Franco-era cross with informational panels according to the Historical Memory Law. The cross was destroyed in 2022 by members of the Basque leftist youth group Ernai.
