= Almirante Cervera-class cruiser =

Class of Spanish light cruisers

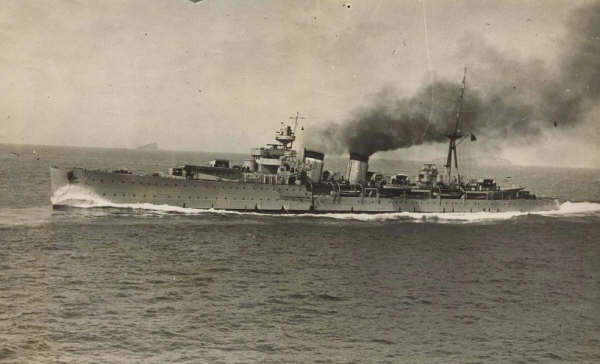
- Almirante Cervera in 1927

Class overview
- Name: Almirante Cervera class
- Builders: Sociedad Española de Construcción Naval, Ferrol
- Operators: Spanish Navy; (Spain) Spanish Republican Navy; (Spain) Spanish Nationalist Navy
- Preceded by: Blas de Lezo class
- Succeeded by: Canarias class
- Built: 1923–1929
- In commission: 1925–1970
- Completed: 3
- Retired: 3

General characteristics
- Type: Light Cruiser
- Displacement: 7,475 long tons (7,595 t) standard; 9,237 long tons (9,385 t) full load
- Length: 579 ft (176 m)
- Beam: 54 ft (16 m)
- Draught: 16 ft 6 in (5.03 m)
- Propulsion: 4 shafts, Parsons-type geared turbines, 8 Yarrow-type boilers, 80,000 hp (60,000 kW)
- Speed: 33 knots (61 km/h; 38 mph)
- Range: 5,000 nmi (9,300 km; 5,800 mi) at 15 kn (28 km/h; 17 mph)
- Complement: 564
- Armament: 8 × 6-inch (152 mm) Vickers-Carraca guns in 3 twin turrets and 2 single mountings; 4 × 4-inch (102 mm) AA guns; 2 × 47 mm (1.9 in) Hotchkiss 3-pdr light AA guns; 12 × 21-inch (533 mm) torpedoes in triple tubes above water
- Armour: Belt 3–2 in (76–51 mm); Deck 1–2 in (25–51 mm); Conning tower 6 in (150 mm)

The Almirante Cervera class (or Alfonso class) were three light cruisers built for the Spanish Navy in the 1920s. The ships were built by Sociedad Española de Construcción Naval in Ferrol which had strong British links and were designed by Sir Philip Watts. It has often been stated that the design was based on the British Emerald-class cruiser, but this seems not in fact to have been the case, although they were clearly an inspiration for the concept of the Spanish ships. The main armament comprised Vickers pattern 6-inch guns with single mountings in "A" and "Y" positions and twin turrets in "B", "Q" and "X" positions. The programme was initially authorised in 1915 but was delayed by World War I with construction of the first ship starting in 1917.

Galicia and Miguel de Cervantes had substantial refits in the 1940s. The 6-inch turret in "Q" position was replaced by a catapult for a seaplane and the single 6-inch mountings were replaced by twins to retain an 8 gun broadside. Extra AA guns were fitted in all three ships.

== Ships ==
Ship	Laid down	Launched	Commissioned	Fate
Príncipe Alfonso / Libertad / Galicia	27 November 1922	3 January 1925	20 September 1927	Stricken Feb 1970
Almirante Cervera	14 April 1923	16 October 1925	15 September 1927	Stricken 31 August 1965
Miguel de Cervantes	March 1926	18 May 1928	10 Feb 1930	Stricken 1 July 1964

== Service history ==
Principe Alfonso conveyed King Alfonso XIII on several foreign tours in the late 1920s and in 1931 took him to exile in Italy. During the Spanish Civil War, renamed Libertad, she served in the Spanish Republican Navy and was interned in Bizerte, French Tunisia, at the end of the conflict. She returned to Spain in 1939 and was renamed Galicia. Miguel de Cervantes (named after Miguel de Cervantes Saavedra) was also part the Republican fleet during the civil war and was torpedoed by the Italian submarine Evangelista Torricelli in 1936. The ship was interned in Bizerte and returned to Spain. She was badly damaged by fire in 1943 and repaired. She represented Spain in the Coronation Fleet Review in 1953. Almirante Cervera (named after Admiral Pascual Cervera y Topete) served on the Nationalist side in the civil war and was present in most of the major battles.

== Bibliography ==
- Chesneau, Roger, ed. (1980). Conway's All the World's Fighting Ships 1922–1946. New York: Mayflower Books. ISBN 0-8317-0303-2.
- García Flórez, Dionisio (2002). Buques de la Guerra Civil Española: Acorazados y Cruceros. Madrid: Almena Ediciones. ISBN 84-932284-3-5.
- Whitley, M. J. (1995). Cruisers of World War Two: An International Encyclopedia. London: Cassell. ISBN 1-86019-874-0.
