= Spanish destroyer Almirante Ferrándiz =

Spanish destroyer Almirante Ferrándiz may refer to:

- Spanish destroyer Almirante Ferrándiz (1928), was a Churruca-class destroyer launched in 1928
- Spanish destroyer Almirante Ferrándiz (D22), was a Fletcher-class destroyer originally launched as USS David W. Taylor (DD-551) in 1941 and acquired by Spain in 1951
