= List of historic Spanish Navy ships =

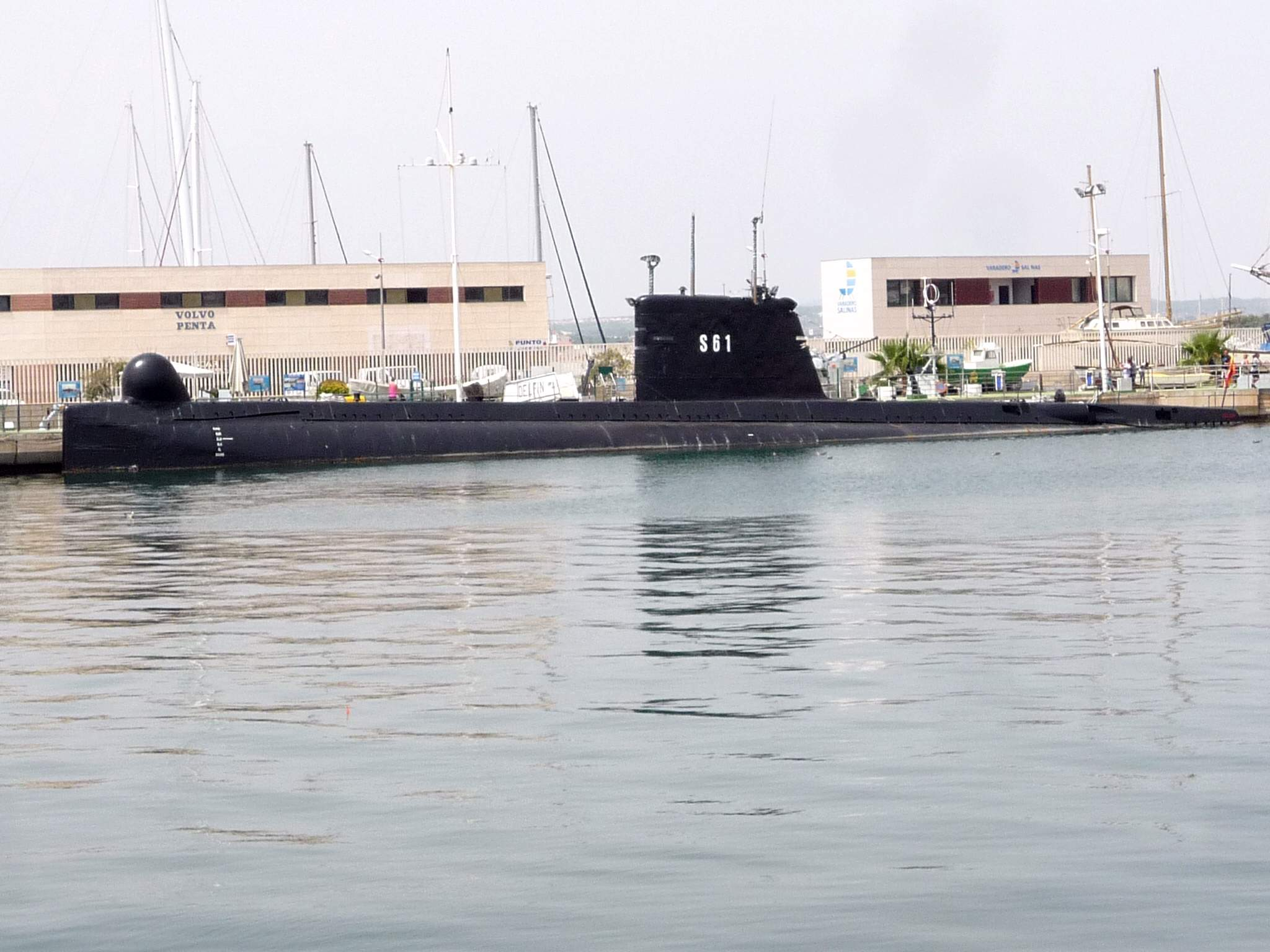
Submarine Delfín (S-61), preserved as museum ship in Torrevieja (Alicante), becoming the first "floating museum" of these characteristics in Spain.

This is a list of naval ships which have been in service in the Spanish Navy and have been retired.

== Aircraft carriers ==
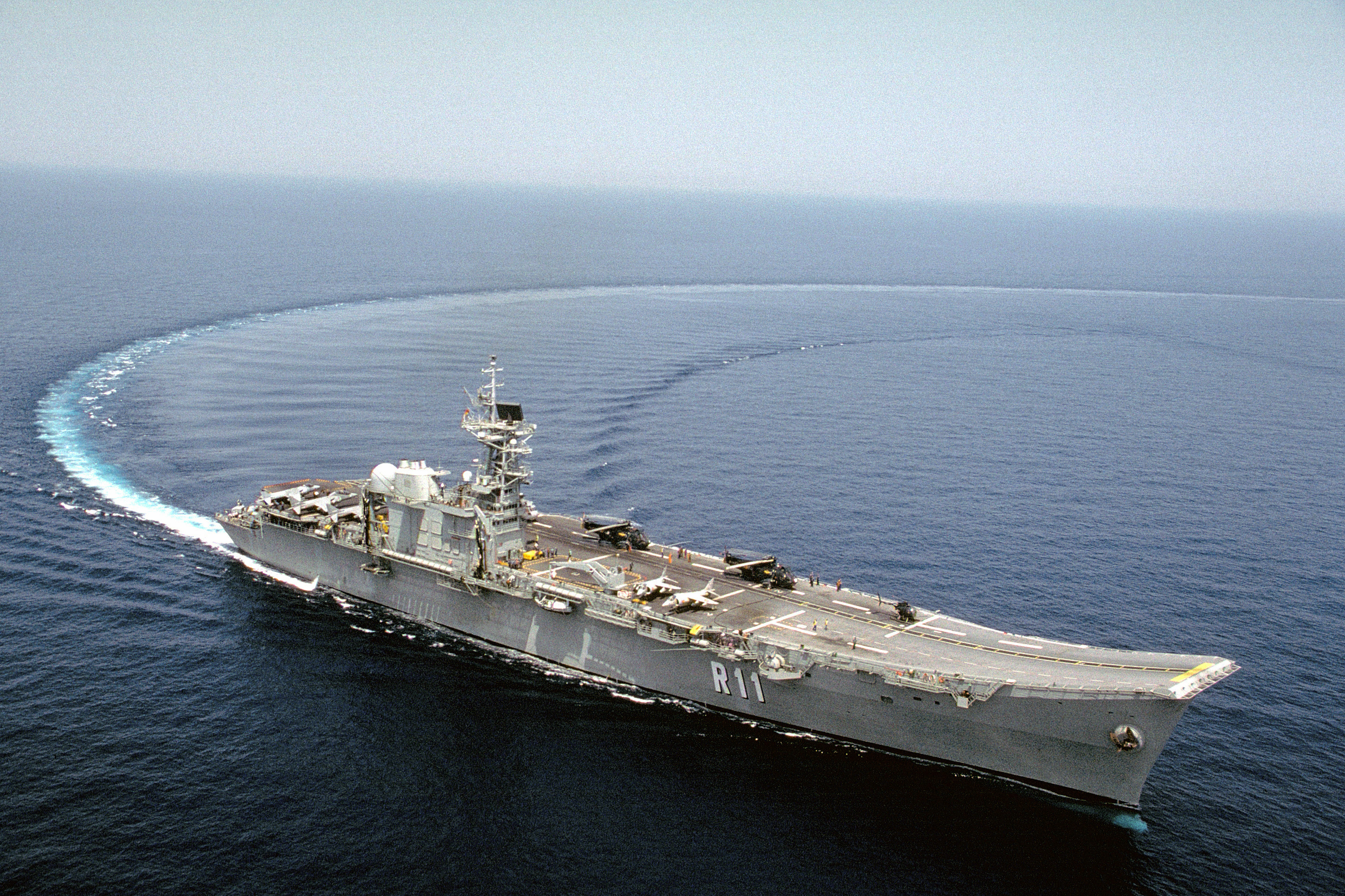
Príncipe de Asturias (R11) .

- Dédalo-class seaplane tender (1)
  - Dédalo (1922–1940) (ex-Neuenfelds 1901–1921)
- Independence class (1)
  - Dédalo (R01) (1967–1989) (ex-USS Cabot (CVL-28) 1943–1955)
- Príncipe de Asturias class (1)
  - Príncipe de Asturias (R11) (1988–2013)

== Amphibious ==
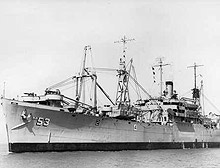
Castilla (TA-21)

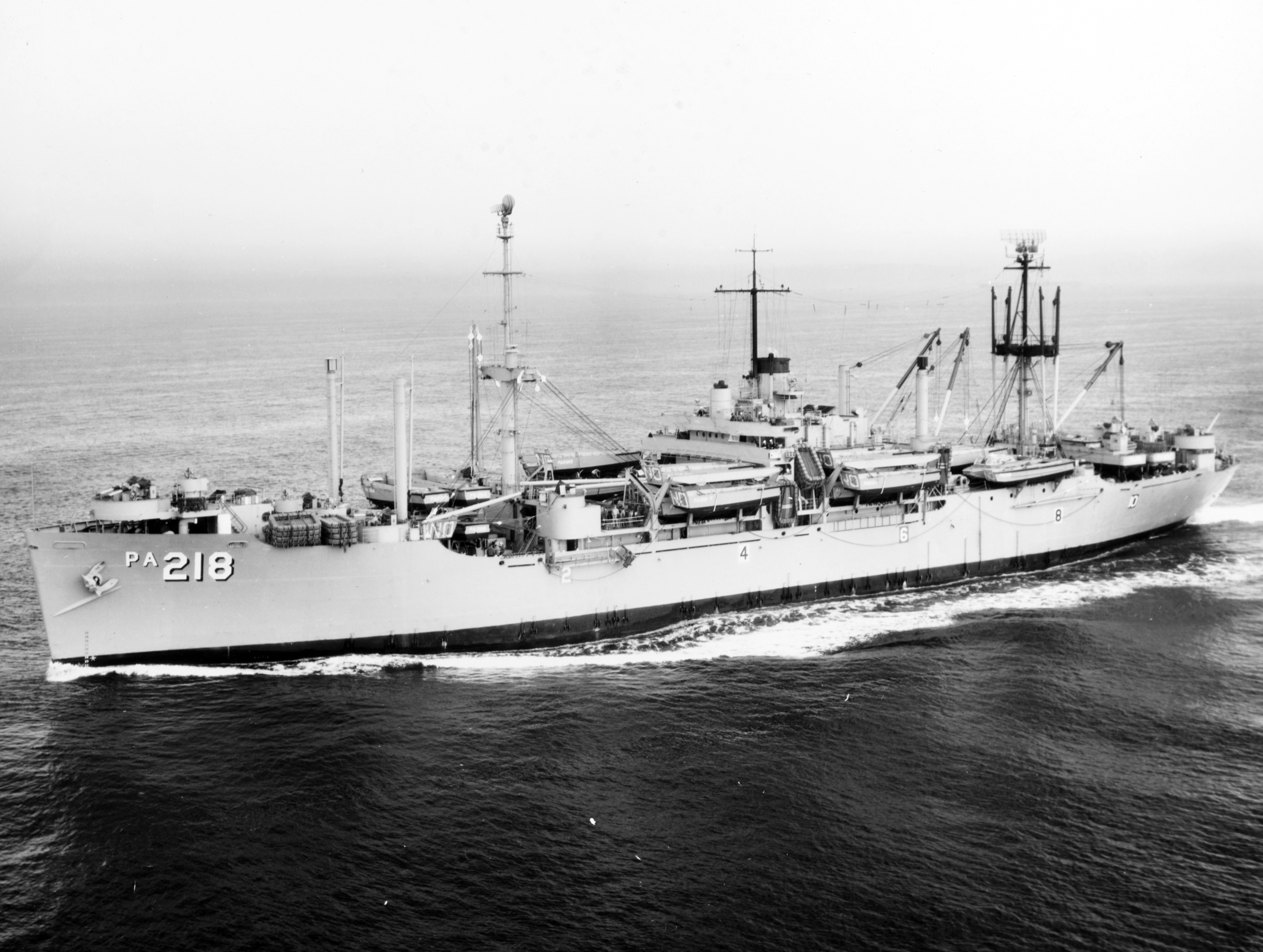
Aragón (TA-11)

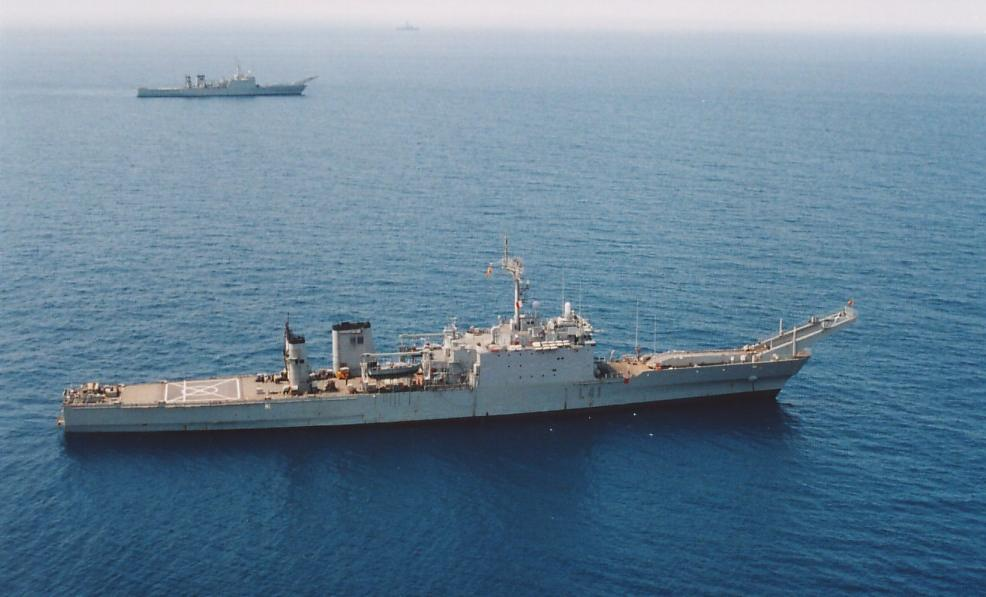
Hernán Cortés (L-41)

- English Xlighter:
  - K-1 to K-26 (1924–1962) ex British X4, X6, X13, X14, X16, X17, X26, X50, X63, X74, X91, X108, X109, X129, X141, X148, X153, X170, X172, X173, X174, X186, X190, X 200, X205 y X221
- Tipo BDK
  - BDK-1 renamed LCT-1. Ex-HMS LCT(4) 1253, ex- Foca (1948–1978)
  - BDK-2 renamed LCT-2. Ex-HMS LCT(4) 1323, ex- Morsa (1948–1983)
  - BDK-3 renamed LCT-3. (1957-)
  - BDK-4 renamed LCT-4. (1957-)
  - BDK-5 renamed LCT-5. (1957-)
  - BDK-6 renamed LCT-6. (1966–2004)
  - BDK-7 renamed LCT-7 renamed A-07. (1966–1997)
  - BDK-8 renamed LCT-8 renamed A-08. (1966–2004)
- LCM3 (1957-)
  - LCM-1 a LCM-19
- LSM
  - LSM-1 ex-USS LSM-329 (1960–1977)
  - LSM-2 ex-USS LSM-331 (1960–1976)
  - LSM-3 ex-USS LSM-343 (1960–1976)
- TA-10 Haskell-class attack transport (APA) (1)
  - TA-11 Aragon (1964–1982) (ex-APA218 Noble 1944–1964)
- TA-20 Andromeda-class attack cargo ship (AKA) (1)
  - TA-21 Castilla (1965–1982) (ex-AKA53 Achernar 1944–1963)
- L-10 Terrebone Parish-class tank landing ship (LST) (3)
  - L-11 Velasco (1971–1994) (ex-LST1156 Terrebonne Parish 1952–1971)
  - L-12 Martín Álvarez (1971–1995) (ex-LST1168 Wexford County 1954–1971)
  - L-13 Conde de Venadito (1972–1990) (ex-LST1159 Tom Green County 1953–1972)
- L-20 Paul Revere-class amphibious transport (LPA) (2)
  - L-21 Castilla (1980–1998) (ex-LPA248 Paul Revere 1958–1980)
  - L-22 Aragón (1980–2000) (ex-LPA249 Francis Marion 1958–1980)
- L-30 Casa Grande-class dock landing ship (LSD) (1)
  - L-31 Galicia (1971–1988) (ex-LSD25 San Marcos 1945–1970)
- L-40 Newport-class tank landing ship (2)
  - L-41 Hernán Cortes (1995–2009) (ex-LST-1197 Barnstable County 1971–1994)
  - L-42 Pizarro (1995–2012) (ex-USS Harlan County 1971–1995)

== Armed launches ==
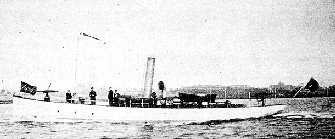
Ligera

The Spanish Navy operated many lanchas cañoneras in the latter half of the 19th century including:

- Pronta (1872–1885)
- Zaragoza
- Viva (1872–1890)
- Ligera (1872–1890)
- Manatí (1875–1893)
- Diligente class
  - Diligente (1876–1899)
  - Atrevida (1877–1899)
- Tarifa (1879–1900)
- Caridad (1879–1898)
- Lealtad (1881–1888)
- Lista (1881–1888)
- Otálora (1881–1898)
- Basco class
  - Basco (1883–1899)
  - Gardoqui (1883–1899)
  - Urdaneta (1883–1899)
- Lince (1887–1890)
- Cóndor class
  - Cóndor (1888–1902)
  - Cuervo (1892–1900)
  - Águila (1892–1900)
- Perla class
  - Perla (1889–1928)
  - Rubí (1889–1899)
  - Diamante (1889–1899)
- Estrella class
  - Estrella (1895–1898)
  - Flecha (1895–1898)
  - Ligera (1895–1898)
  - Lince (1895–1898)
  - Satélite (1895–1898)
  - Vigía (1895–1898)
- Alerta class
  - Alerta (1895–1900)
  - Ardilla (1895–1898)
  - Cometa (1895–1898)
  - Fradera (1895–1898)
  - Gaviota (1895–1898)
  - Golondrina (1895–1898)
- Almendares class
  - Almendares (1895–1898)
  - Baracoa (1895–1898)
  - Cauto (1895–1898)
  - Guantánamo (1895–1898)
  - Yumurí (1895–1898)
  - Mayarí (1895–1898)
- Lanao class
  - Lanao (1895–1898)
  - General Blanco (1895–1898)
- Corcuera class
  - Corcuera (1895–1898)
  - Almonte (1895–1898)
- Oceanía (1898)

== Auxiliary ships ==
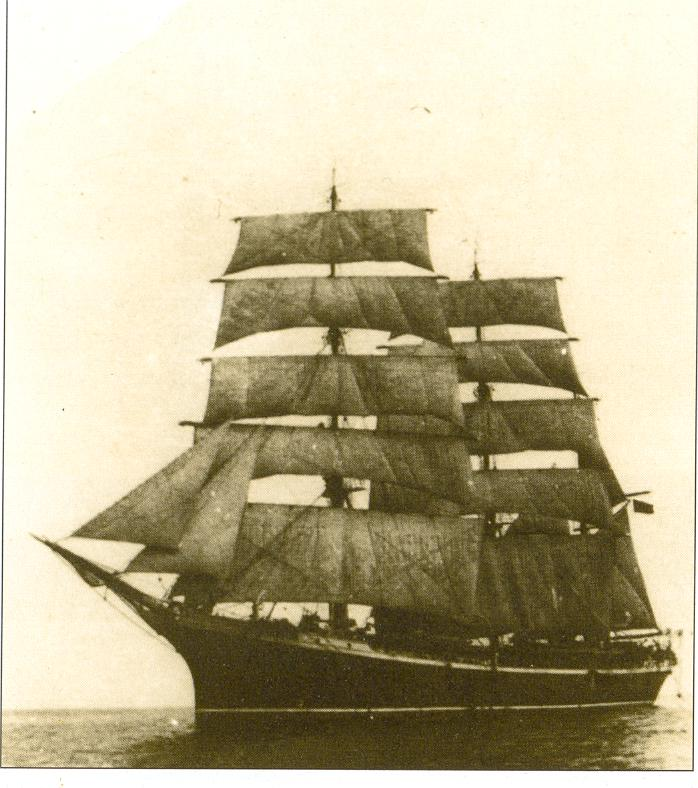
Galatea

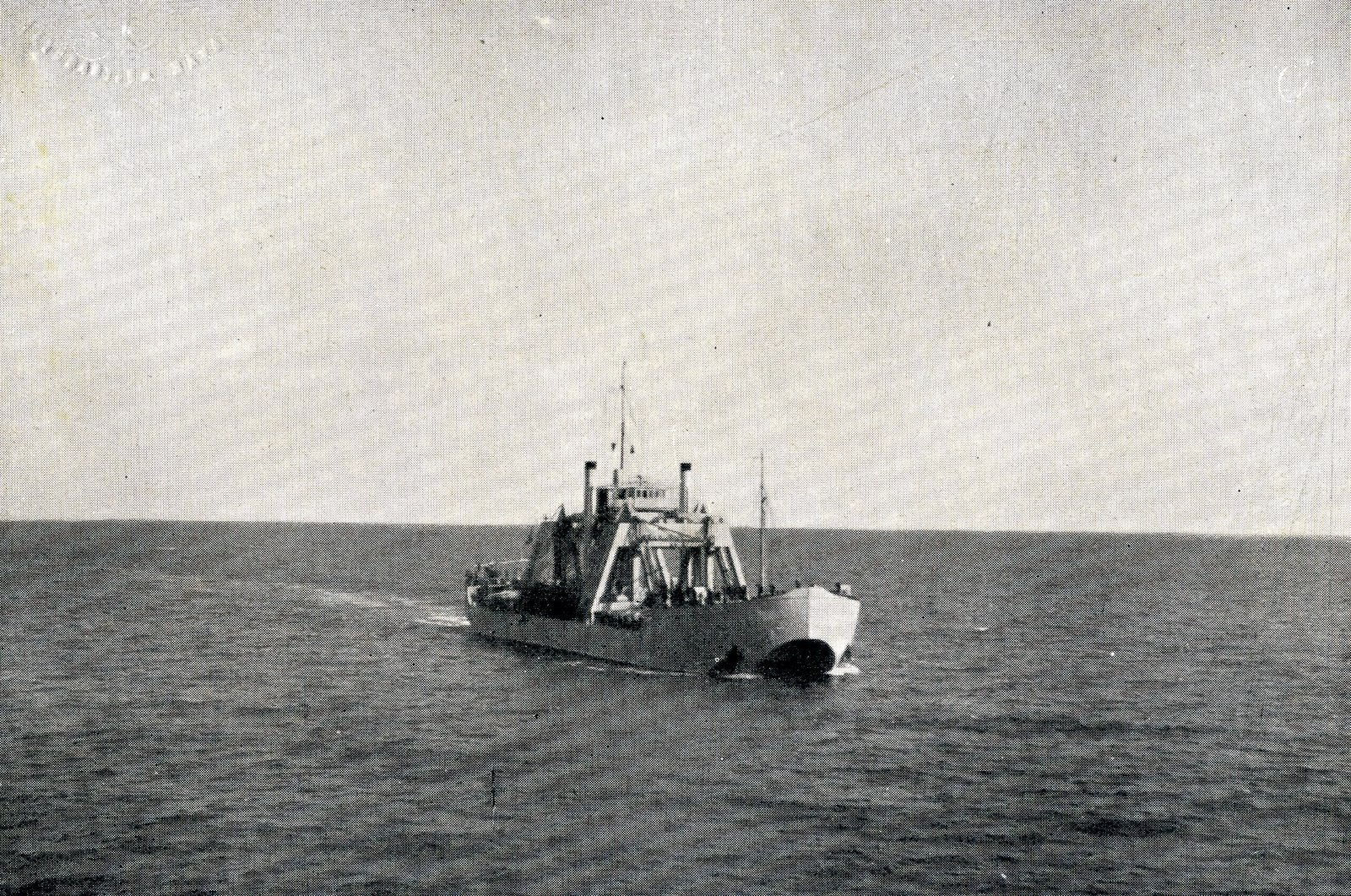
Kanguro

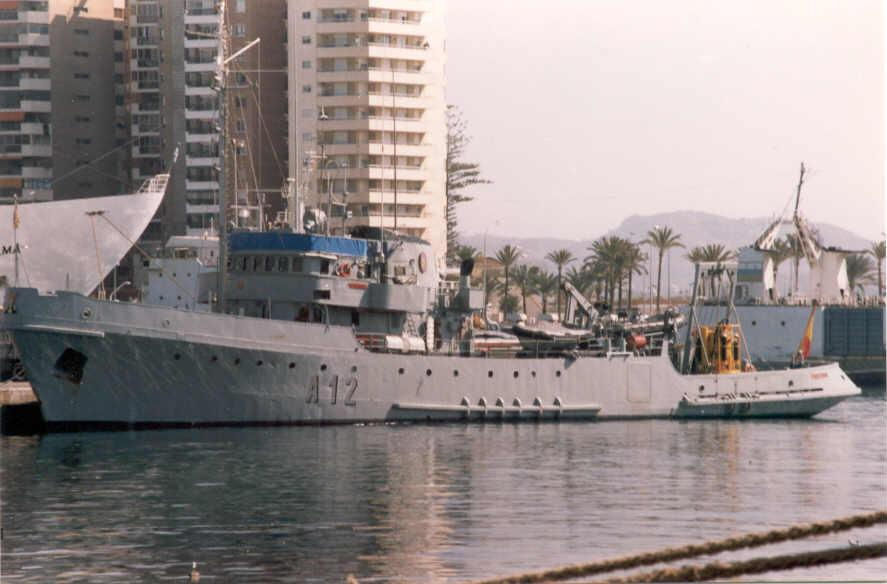
Poseidón (A-12)

- Coastal water tankers
  - África > A-5 (1925–1954)
  - A-1 (1933–1977)
  - A-2 (1933–1984)
  - A-3 (1935–1965)
  - A-4 (1935–1968)
  - A-6 > AA-06 > Contramaestre Castelló (1952–1996)
  - A-7 > AA17 (1952–1982)
  - A-8 (1952–1977)
  - A-9 > AA-21 > A-62 Maquinista Macias (1963–1993)
  - A-10 > AA-22 > A-63 Torpedista Hernandez (1963–2004)
  - A-11 > AA-23 > A-64 Fogonero Bañobre (1963–1993)
  - A-65 Marinero Jarano (1981–2010)
  - A-66 Condestable Zaragoza (1981–2009)
- Fleet oilers
  - Plutón (1934–1970), ex Campsa oiler Campillo
  - A-11 Teide (1956–1988)
  - A-11 Marques de la Ensenada (1991–2012)
- Royal yacht, training ship, survey ship
  - Giralda (aviso 1898-1900, royal yacht 1900-1918, training ship 1918-1920, survey ship 1920-1934)
- School Ships
  - Nautilus (1886–1925) ex Carric Castle
  - Galatea (1922–1969) ex Glenlee – ex Islamount - ex Clarastella, preserved as Glenlee at Glasgow.
- Submarine rescue ship
  - Kanguro (1920–1943)
- Training ships
  - A-77 Salvora (2001–2012)
  - A-79 Hispaniola (2011–2012)
- Transports
  - San Quintín
  - San Francisco de Borja
  - Patiño
  - Marqués de la Victoria
  - Ferrol
  - San Antonio
  - Legazpi (ex-mercantile Zamboanga ex-Formosa) (attached to Cuban squadron during the Spanish–American War)
  - Cebú (ex-mercantile Julieta) (attached to the Philippines squadron during the Spanish–American War)
  - General Alava (1895–1898) (Captured by USN in the Spanish–American War).
  - Almirante Lobo (1909) (1909–1942)
  - Contramaestre Casado
  - Tarifa (ex-Castillo de Arevalo)
  - Almirante Lobo (A-41) (1954–1977)
  - A-05 El camino español (ex-Araguary) (1984/1999-2019)
  - A-04 Martín Posadillo (ex-Cala Portas) (2000–2020)
- Salvage ship
  - Poseidon

== Battleships ==
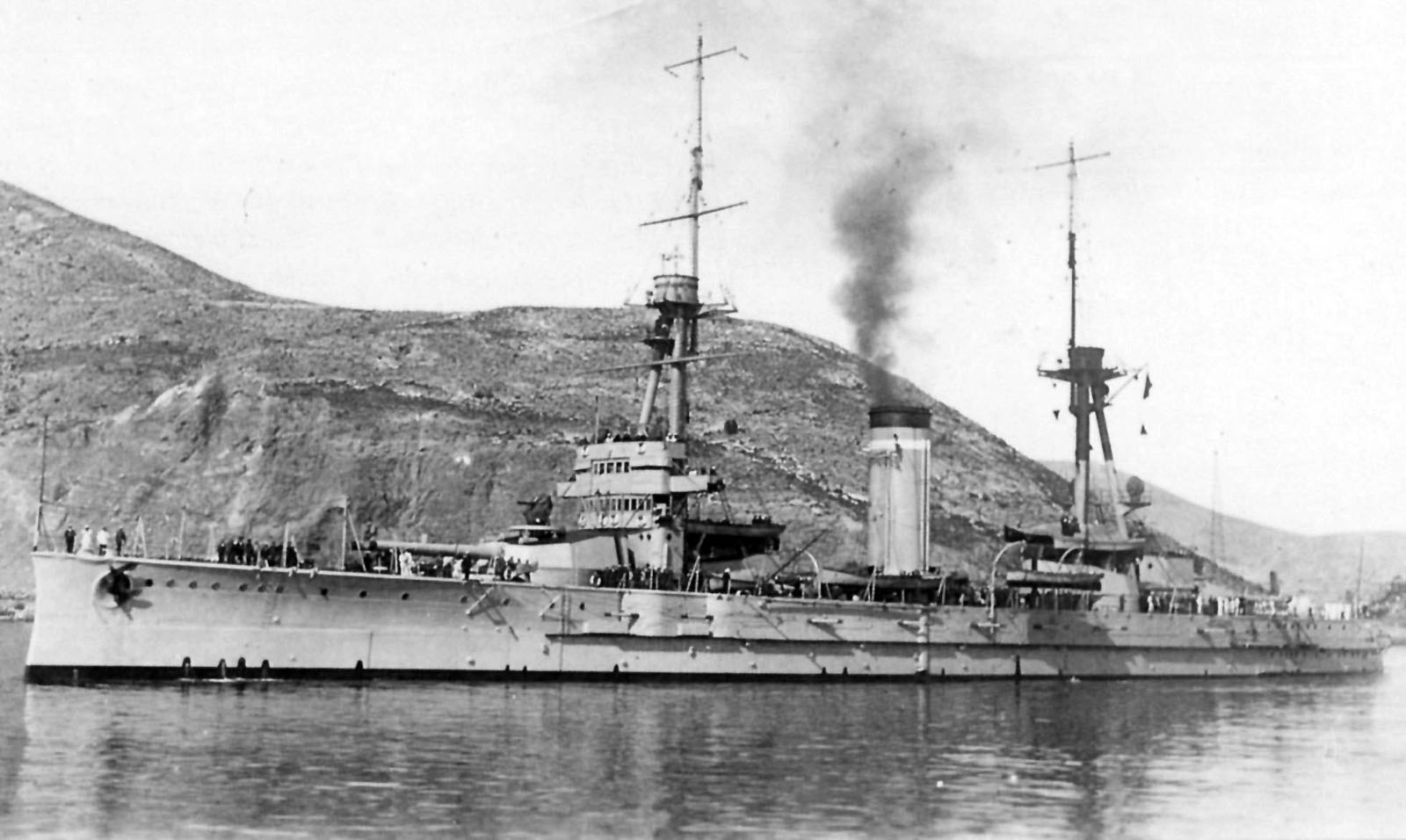
Alfonso XIII

=== Pre-dreadnought ===
- Pelayo (1888–1925)

=== Dreadnought ===
- España class (3)
  - España (1913–1923)
  - Alfonso XIII > España (1915 > 1931–1937)
  - Jaime I (1921–1937)

== Carracks and Galleons ==
- List of carracks and galleons (1410–1639)

== Corvettes ==
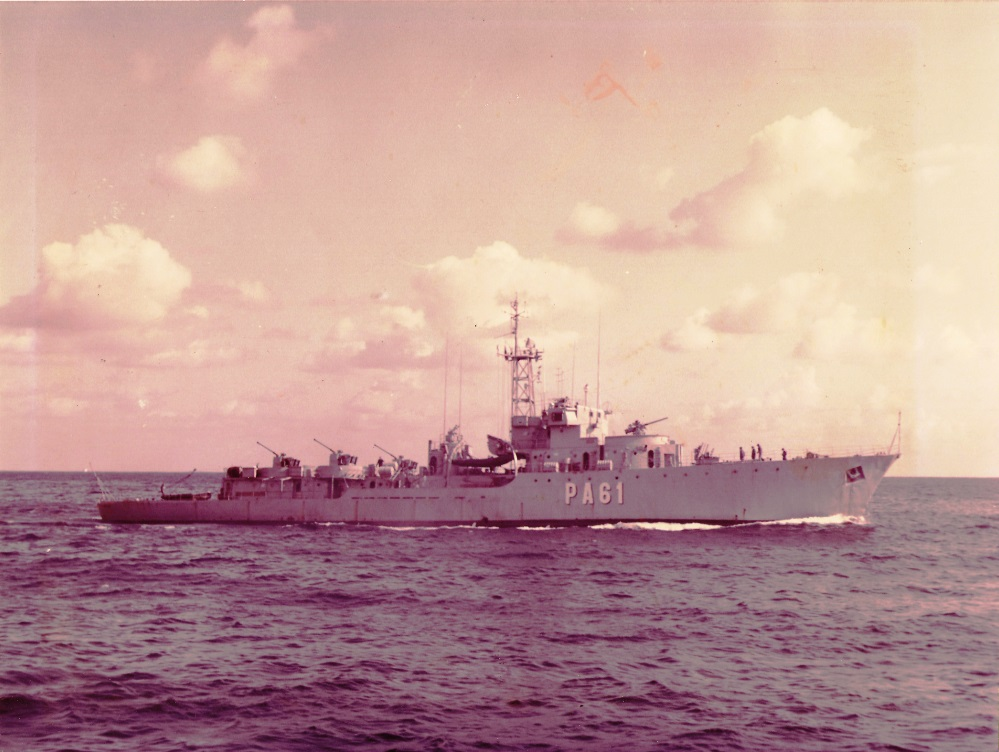
Atrevida (F-61)

- F-50 Descubierta class (1)
  - F-51 Descubierta (1954–1970)
- F-60 Atrevida class (Descubierta modernized*) (5)
  - F-61 Atrevida (1955/1960*-1992)
  - F-62 Princesa (1959–1991)
  - F-63 Diana (1960–1973)
  - F-64 Nautilus (1959–1991)
  - F-65 Villa de Bilbao (1960–1992)
- F-30 Descubierta class (6)
  - F31 Descubierta (1978–2000) > P75 Descubierta (2000–2009)
  - F32 Diana (1979–2000) > M-11 Diana (2000–2015)
  - F33 Infanta Elena (1980–2000) > P76 Infanta Elena (2000–2023)
  - F34 Infanta Cristina (1980–2000) > P77 Infanta Cristina (2000–2023)
  - F35 Cazadora (1981–2004) > P78 Cazadora (2004–2018)
  - F36 Vencedora (1982–2004) > P79 Vencedora (2004–2017)

== Cruisers ==
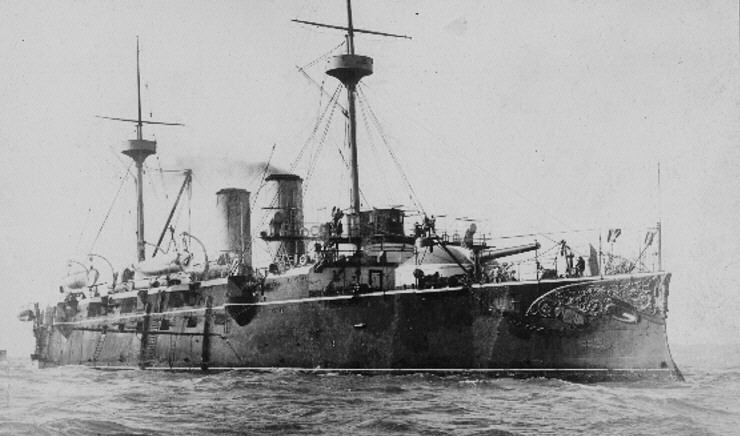
Vizcaya

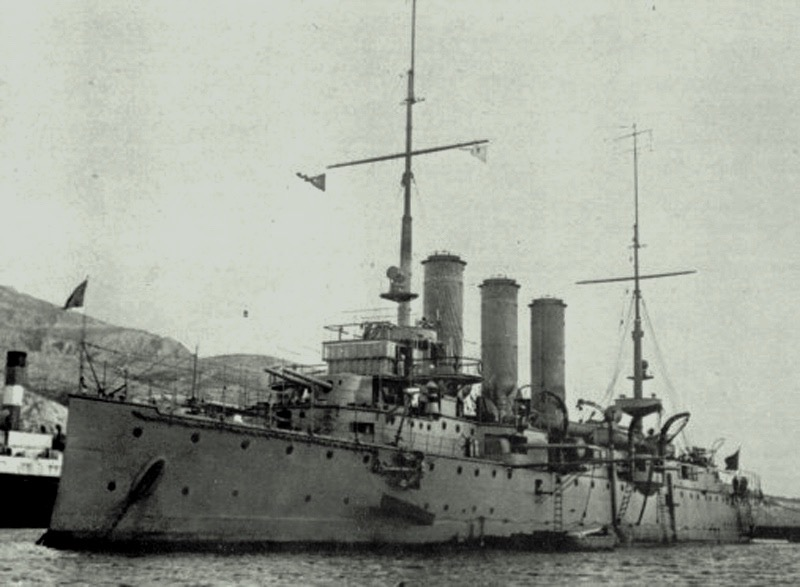
Reina Regente

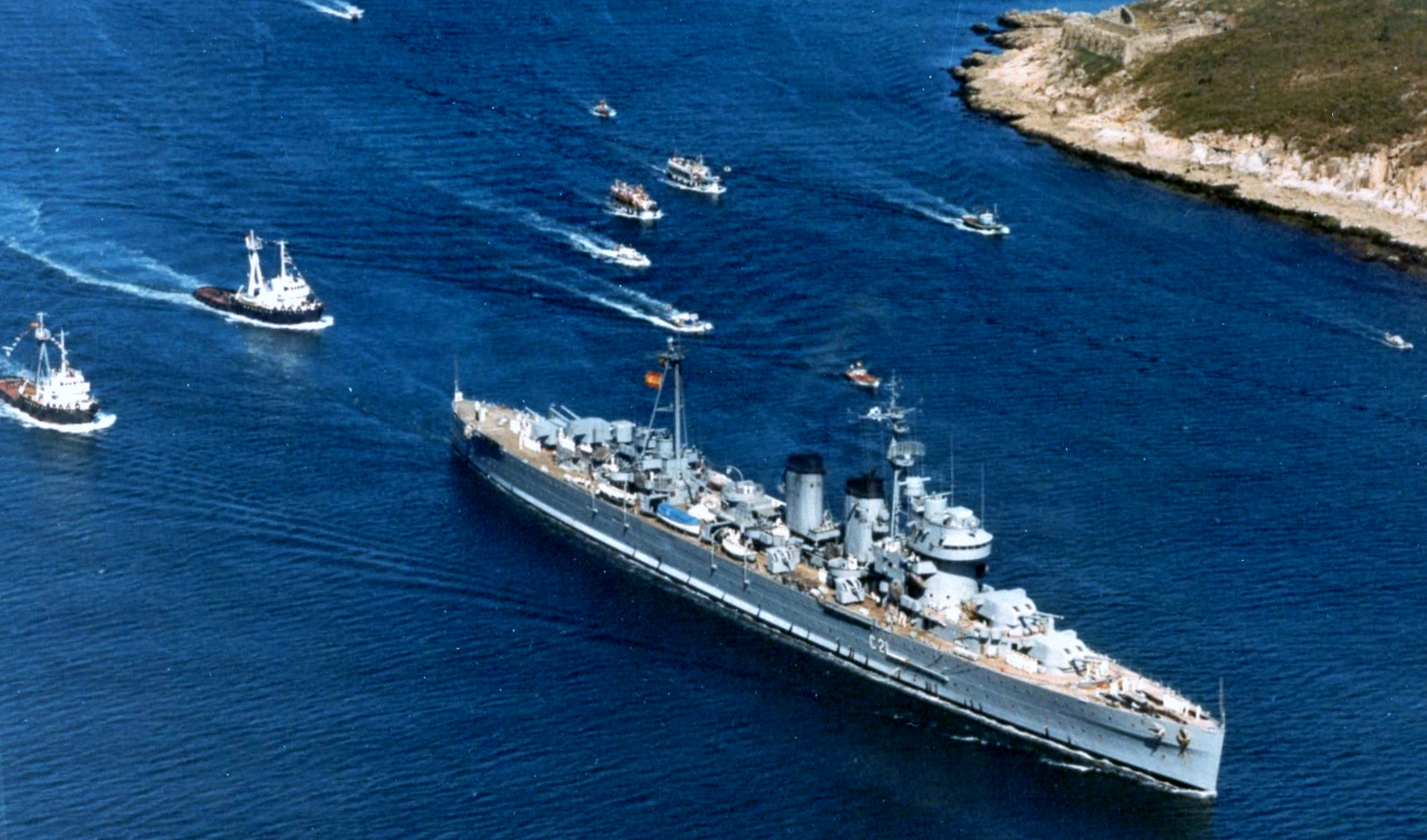
Canarias

- Aragon class (3)
  - Aragón (1881–1898)
  - Navarra (1884–1899)
  - Castilla (1886–1898)
- Velasco class (8)
  - Velasco (1881–1898)
  - Gravina (1881–1884)
  - Infanta Isabel (1885–1926)
  - Isabel II (1886–1900)
  - Cristóbal Colón (1889–1895)
  - Don Juan de Austria (1890–1898)
  - Conde de Venadito (1891–1900)
  - Don Antonio de Ulloa (1889–1898)
- Isla de Luzon class (3)
  - Isla de Luzon (1887–1898)
  - Isla de Cuba (1887–1898)
  - Marques de la Ensenada (1894–1900)
- Reina Regente class (3)
  - Reina Regente (1887–1895)
  - Alfonso XIII (1898–1900)
  - Lepanto (1898–1908)
- Alfonso XII class (3)
  - Alfonso XII (1891–1900)
  - Reina Cristina (1890–1898)
  - Reina Mercedes (1892–1898)
- Infanta Maria Teresa class (3)
  - Infanta Maria Teresa (1893–1898)
  - Vizcaya (1894–1898)
  - Almirante Oquendo (1895–1898)
- Giuseppe Garibaldi class (1)
  - Cristóbal Colón (1897–1898)
- Emperador Carlos V class (1)
  - Emperador Carlos V (1897–1931)
- Rio de la Plata class (1)
  - Río de la Plata (1899–1931)
- Extremadura class (1)
  - Extremadura (1902–1931)
- Princesa de Asturias-class (3)
  - Cardenal Cisneros (1902–1905)
  - Cataluña (1908–1928)
  - Princesa de Asturias (1903–1927)
- Reina Regente class (1)
  - Reina Regente (1910–1926)
- Navarra class (1)
  - Reina Victoria Eugenia > Republica > Navarra (1923>1934>1936-1955)
- Blas de Lezo class (2)
  - Blas de Lezo (1925–1932)
  - Méndez Núñez (1924–1963)
- Almirante Cervera class (3)
  - Almirante Cervera (1928–1965)
  - Príncipe Alfonso > Libertad > Galicia (1927>1936>1939-1970)
  - Miguel de Cervantes (1930–1964)
- Canarias class (2)
  - Canarias (1936–1975)
  - Baleares (1936–1938)

== Destroyers ==
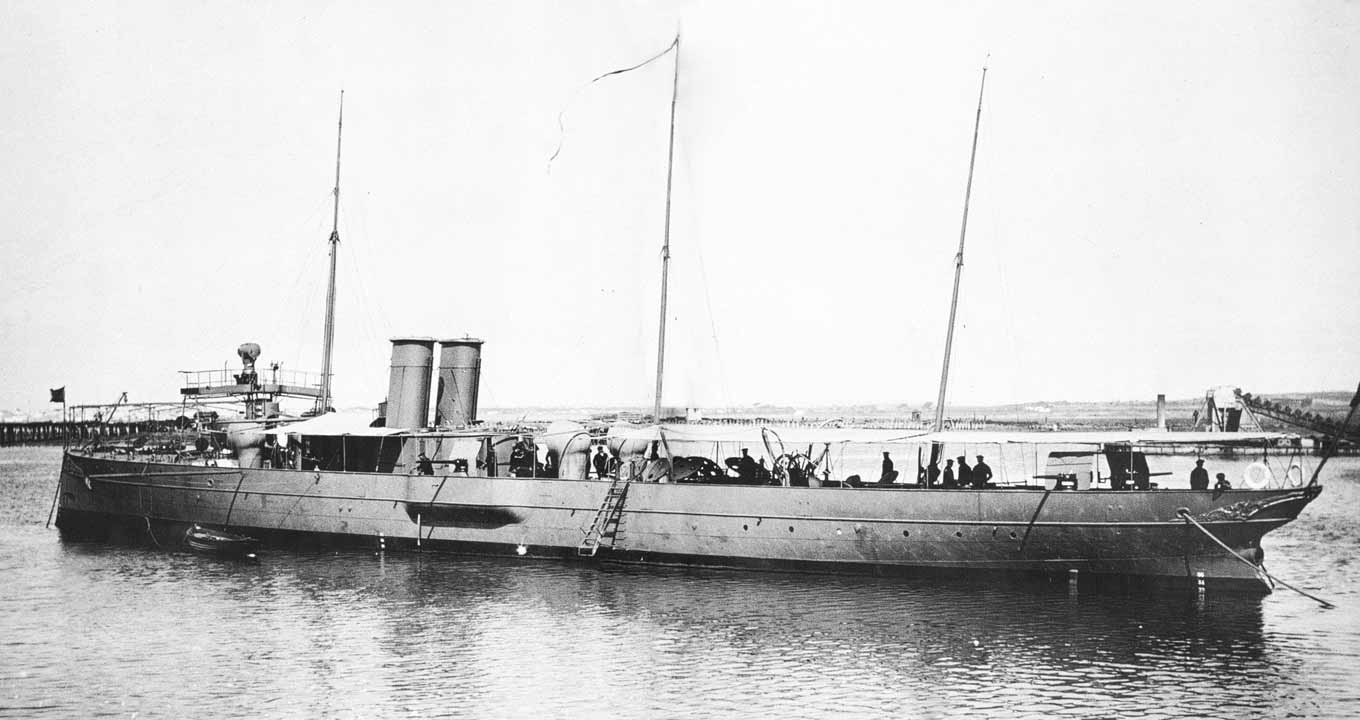
Destructor

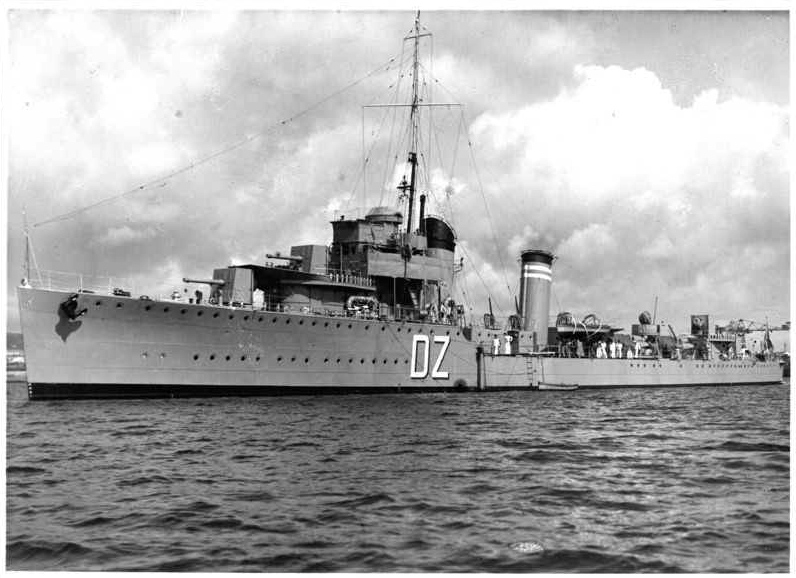
José Luis Díez

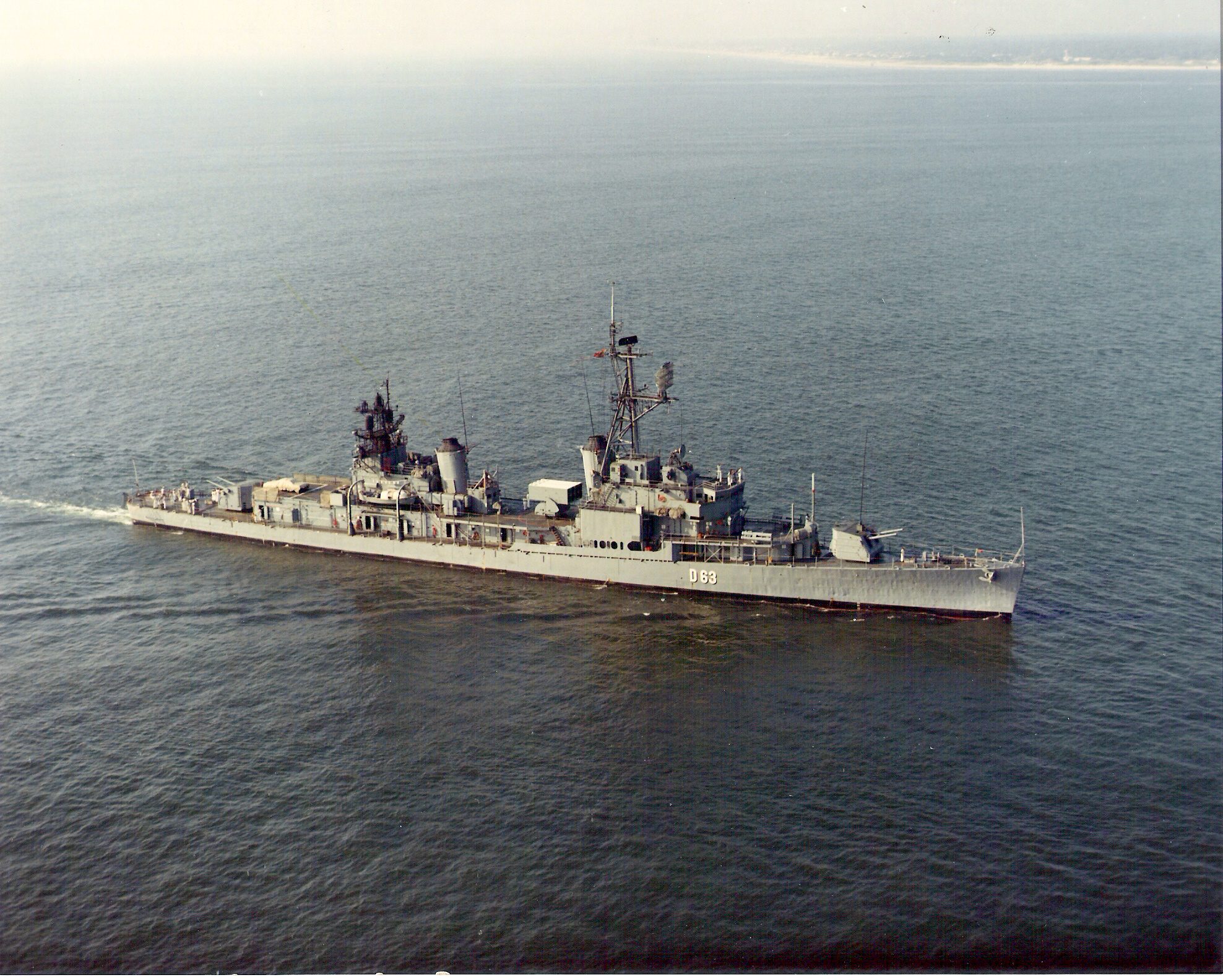
Méndez Núñez (D-63)

- Destructor class (1)
  - Destructor (1887–1909)
- Furor class (6)
  - Furor (1897–1898)
  - Terror (1897–1925)
  - Audaz (1898–1924)
  - Osado (1898–1924)
  - Plutón (1897–1898)
  - Proserpina (1898–1931)
- Bustamante class (3)
  - Bustamante (1914–1931)
  - Villaamil (1916–1932)
  - Cadarso (1917–1931)
- Alsedo class (3)
  - Alsedo (1924–1957)
  - Velasco (1924–1957)
  - Lazaga (1925–1961)
- Churruca I class (7)
  - Sanchez Barcáiztegui (1928–1964)
  - José Luis Díez (1929–1965)
  - Almirante Ferrándiz (1929–1936)
  - Lepanto (1930–1957)
  - Churruca (1931–1963)
  - Alcalá Galiano (1931–1957)
  - Almirante Valdés (1933–1957)
- Churruca II class (7)
  - Almirante Antequera (1935–1965)
  - Almirante Miranda (1936–1970)
  - Ciscar (1936–1957)
  - Escaño (1936–1963)
  - Gravina (1936–1963)
  - Jorge Juan (1937–1959)
  - Ulloa (1937–1963)
- Liniers class (Churruca III, modernized*) (2)
  - D-51 Liniers (1951/1962*-1982)
  - D-52 Álava (1951/1962*-1978)
- Alessandro Poerio/Huesca class (2)
  - Huesca (1937–1953) (ex-Alessandro Poerio 1915–1937)
  - Teruel (1937–1948) (ex-Guglielmo Pepe 1915–1937)
- Aquila/Mărăşti/Ceuta class (2)
  - Ceuta (1937–1948) (ex-Falco, ex-Viscol 1919–1937)
  - Melilla (1937–1950) (ex-Aquila 1916–1937) (ex-Vifor 1919–1937)
- D-30 Audaz class (9)
  - Audaz (D-31) (1953–1974)
  - Osado (D-32) (1955–1972)
  - Meteoro (D-33) (1955–1974)
  - Furor (D-34) (1960–1974)
  - Rayo (D-35) (1958–1974)
  - Ariete (D-36) (1961–1966)
  - Temerario (D-37) (1964–1975)
  - Intrépido (D-38) (1965–1982)
  - Relámpago (D-39) (1965–1975)
- D-20 Fletcher/Lepanto class (5)
  - D-21 Lepanto (1957-1985) (ex-DD550 Capps 1943–57)
  - D-22 Almirante Ferrándiz (1957–1987) (ex-DD551 David W. Taylor 1943–57)
  - D-23 Almirante Valdés (1959–1986) (ex-DD509 Converse 1942–59)
  - D-24 Alcalá Galiano (1960–1988) (ex-DD779 Jarvis 1944–60)
  - D-25 Jorge Juan (1960–1988) (ex-DD678 McGowan 1943–60)
- D-40 Oquendo class (3)
  - D-41 Oquendo (1963–1978)
  - D-42 Roger de Lauria (1969–1982)
  - D-43 Marqués de la Ensenada (1970–1988)
- D-60 Gearing FRAM II/Churruca class (5)
  - D-61 Churruca (1972–1989) (ex-DD711 Eugene A. Greene 1945–72)
  - D-62 Gravina (1972–1991) (ex-DD882 Furse 1945–72)
  - D-63 Méndez Núñez (1973–1992) (ex-DD889 O'Hare 1945–73)
  - D-64 Lángara (1973–1992) (ex-DD879 Leary 1945–73)
  - D-65 Blas de Lezo (1973–1991) (ex-DD841 Noa 1945–73)

== Frigates ==
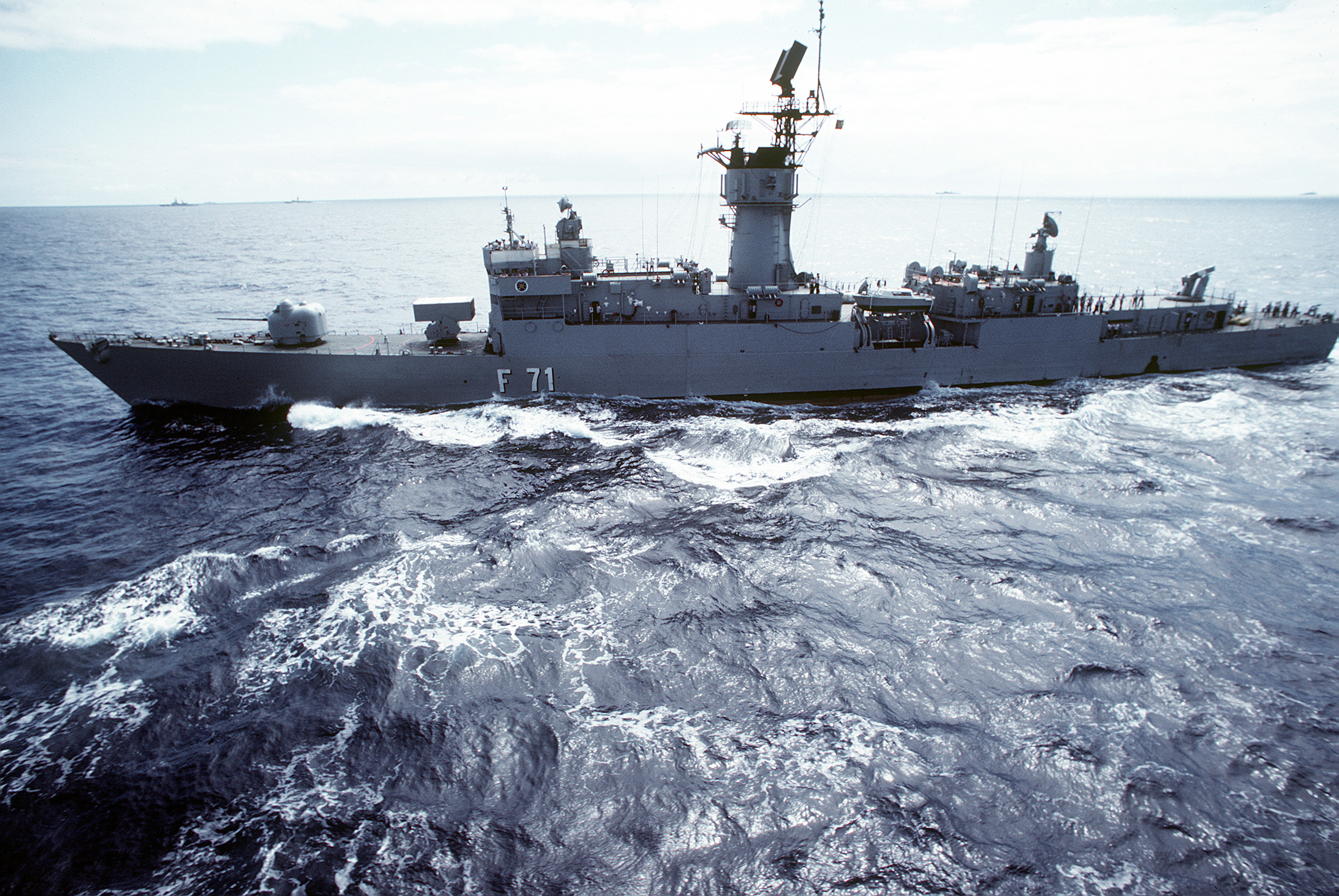
Baleares (F71)

- F-30 Pizarro class, (ex-gunboats) (6)
  - F-31 Pizarro (1946–1970)
  - F-32 Hernán Cortés (1947–1971)
  - F-33 Vasco Núñez de Balboa (1947–1965)
  - F-34 Martín Alonso Pinzón (1948–1966)
  - F-35 Magallanes (1948–1971)
  - F-36 Sarmiento de Gamboa (1950–1974)
- F-40 Vicente Yáñez Pinzón class, (ex-gunboats), (Pizarro modernized*) (2)
  - F-41 Vicente Yáñez Pinzón (1949/1960*-1983)
  - F-42 Legazpi (1951/1960*-1978)
- F-70 Baleares class (5)
  - F-71 Baleares (1973–2004)
  - F-72 Andalucia (1974–2005)
  - F-73 Cataluna (1975–2004)
  - F-74 Asturias (1975–2009)
  - F-75 Extremadura (1976–2006)

== Gunboats ==
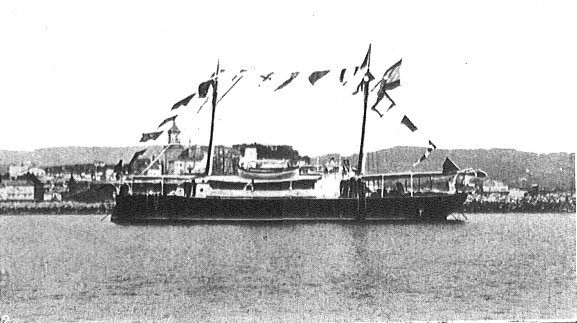
Mac-Mahón

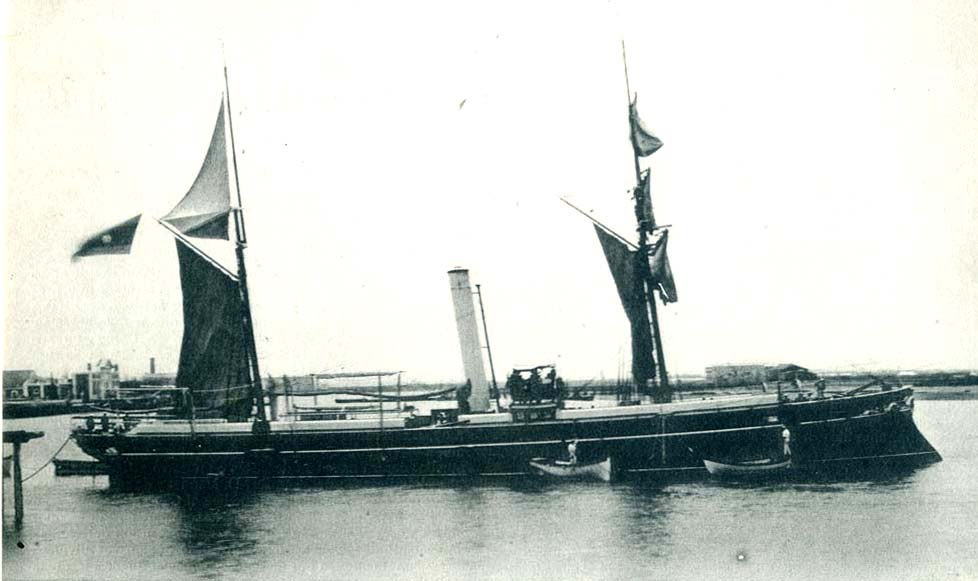
General Concha

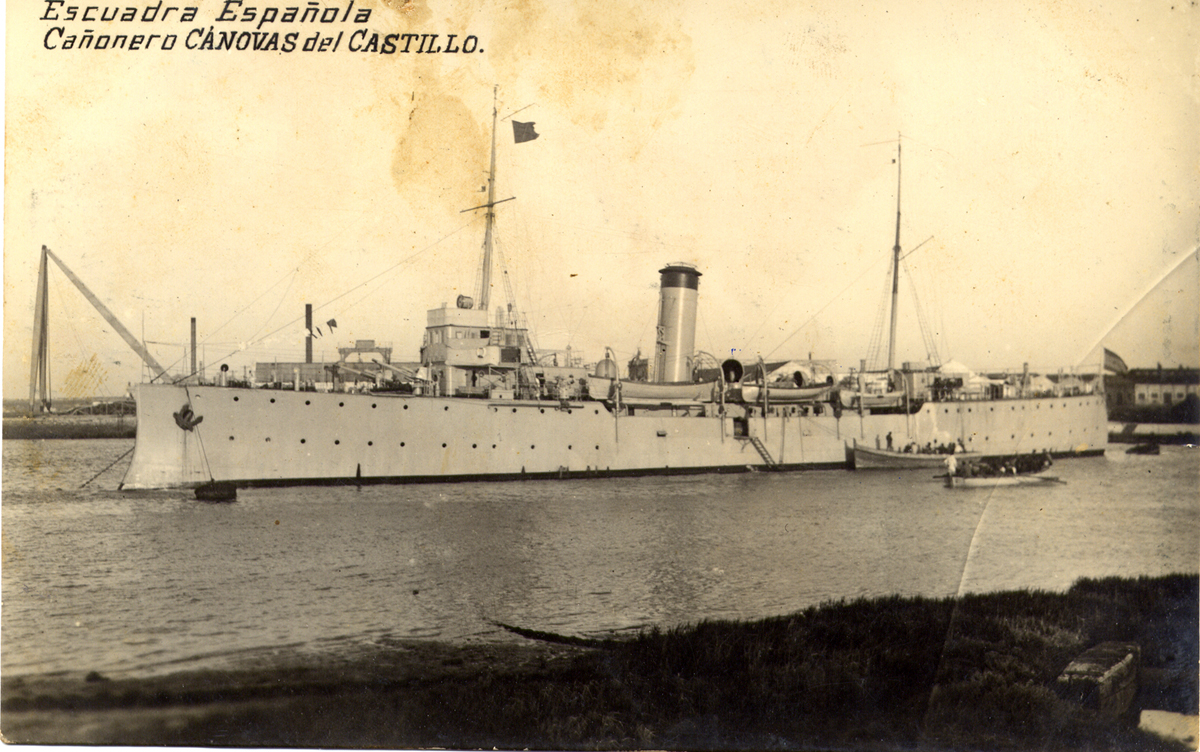
Cánovas del Castillo

- Mindanao class 2nd class gunboats
  - Mindanao (1860- )
  - Calamianes (1860- )
  - Paragua (1860- )
  - Mindoro (1860- )
  - Luzón (1860- )
  - Panay (1860- )
  - Samar (1860- )
  - Cebú (1860- )
- Bulusán class 2nd class gunboats
  - Bulusán (1860- )
  - Joló (1860- )
  - Mariveles (1860- )
  - Arayat (1860- )
  - Pampanga (1860- )
  - Bojeador (1860- )
  - Balanguingui (1860- )
  - Albay (1861- )
  - Mactán (1861- )
  - Taal (1861- )
- Ericsson class 2nd class wooden screw gunboats
  - Ericsson (1869–1897)
  - Activo (1869–1885)
  - Rápido (1869–1880) sunk in bajo de los Colorados
  - Argos (1869–1885)
  - Lince (1869–1885)
  - Centinela (1869–1885)
  - Guardián (1869- )
  - Vigía (1869- )
  - Astuto (1869–1885)
  - Almendares (1869- )
  - Eco (1869–1885)
  - Destello (1869–1885)
  - Contramaestre (1869–1898)
  - Marinero (1869–1885)
  - Soldado (1869–1873) naufragó
  - ¿Quién Vive? (1869–1872) renamed Celaje, boarding by merchant ship Clara
  - Lebrel (1869–1873) boarding
  - Cazador (1869- )
  - Cauto (1869–1891)
  - Gacela (1869- )
  - Telegrama (1869- )
  - Criollo (1869–1898)
  - Ardid (1869–1885)
  - Indio (1869–1897)
  - Caribe (1869–1885)
  - Alarma (1869- )
  - Descubridor (1869–1897)
  - Yumurí (1869- )
  - Flecha (1869- )
  - Dardo (1869–1885)
- Cuba Española (1870–1898) 2nd class wooden screw gunboat
- Martín Álvarez (1871–1876)
- Rayo (1874–1883)
- Callao (1874–1888)
- Salamandra class 2nd class wooden screw gunboats (except Salamandra which was iron)
  - Salamandra (1874–1898)
  - Cocodrilo (1875–1899)
  - Pelícano (1874–1898)
- Fernando el Católico class 1st class iron screw gunboats
  - Fernando el Católico (1875–1898)
  - Marqués del Duero (1875–1898)
- Somorrostro class 2nd class gunboats
  - Somorrostro (1875- ) modified to water tank ship in 1892
  - Ebro (1875–1896)
  - Bidasoa (1875–1900)
  - Teruel (1875–1896)
  - Nervión (1875–1896)
  - Toledo (1875–1900)
  - Tajo (1875–1895)
  - Arlanza (1875–1928) modified to water tank ship in 1899
  - Turia (1875–1878)
  - Segura (1875–1900)
- Prueba (1875–1893)
- Jorge Juan class iron screw avisos
  - Jorge Juan (1876–1898)
  - Sánchez Barcáiztegui (1876–1895)
- Martín Álvarez (1878–1882)
- Clase Pilar 2nd class iron screw gunboats
  - Pilar (1881–1900)
  - Paz (1881–1889)
  - Eulalia (1882–1897)
  - Alsedo (1882–1898)
- Clase General Lezo 2nd class iron screw gunboats
  - General Lezo (1885–1898)
  - General Concha (1887–1913)
  - Magallanes (1885–1903)
  - Elcano (1885–1899)
- Mac-Mahón class 2nd class steel screw gunboat
  - Mac-Mahón (1888–1932)
- Álvaro de Bazán class
  - María de Molina (1902–1926)
  - Marqués de la Victoria (1902–1926)
  - Álvaro de Bazán (1904–1926)
- Recalde class
  - Recalde (1910–1932)
  - Laya (1910–1940)
  - Bonifaz (1911–1932)
  - Lauria (1912–1940)
- Cánovas del Castillo class
  - Canovas del Castillo (1923–1959)
  - Canalejas (1924–1951)
  - Eduardo Dato (1925–1953)
- Calvo Sotelo class
  - Calvo Sotelo (1938–1957)

== Ironclads ==
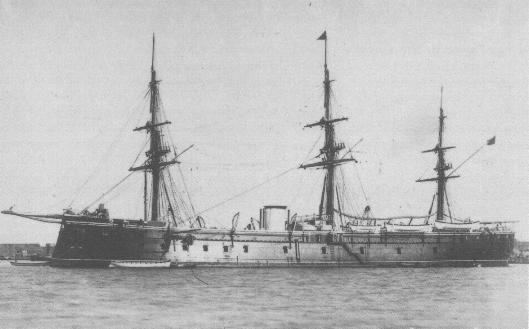
Numancia

=== Broadside Ironclads ===
- Numancia (1863) - BU 1920
- Tetuan (1863) - Blew up 30 December 1873
- Arapiles (1864) - stricken 1873
- Vitoria (1865) - BU 1910
- Zaragoza (1867) - stricken 1899
- Sagunto (1869) - scrap in 1896

=== Central Battery Ships ===
- Mendez Nuñez (1869) - scrap in 1888. Ex-screw frigate Resolución.

== Minelayer ==
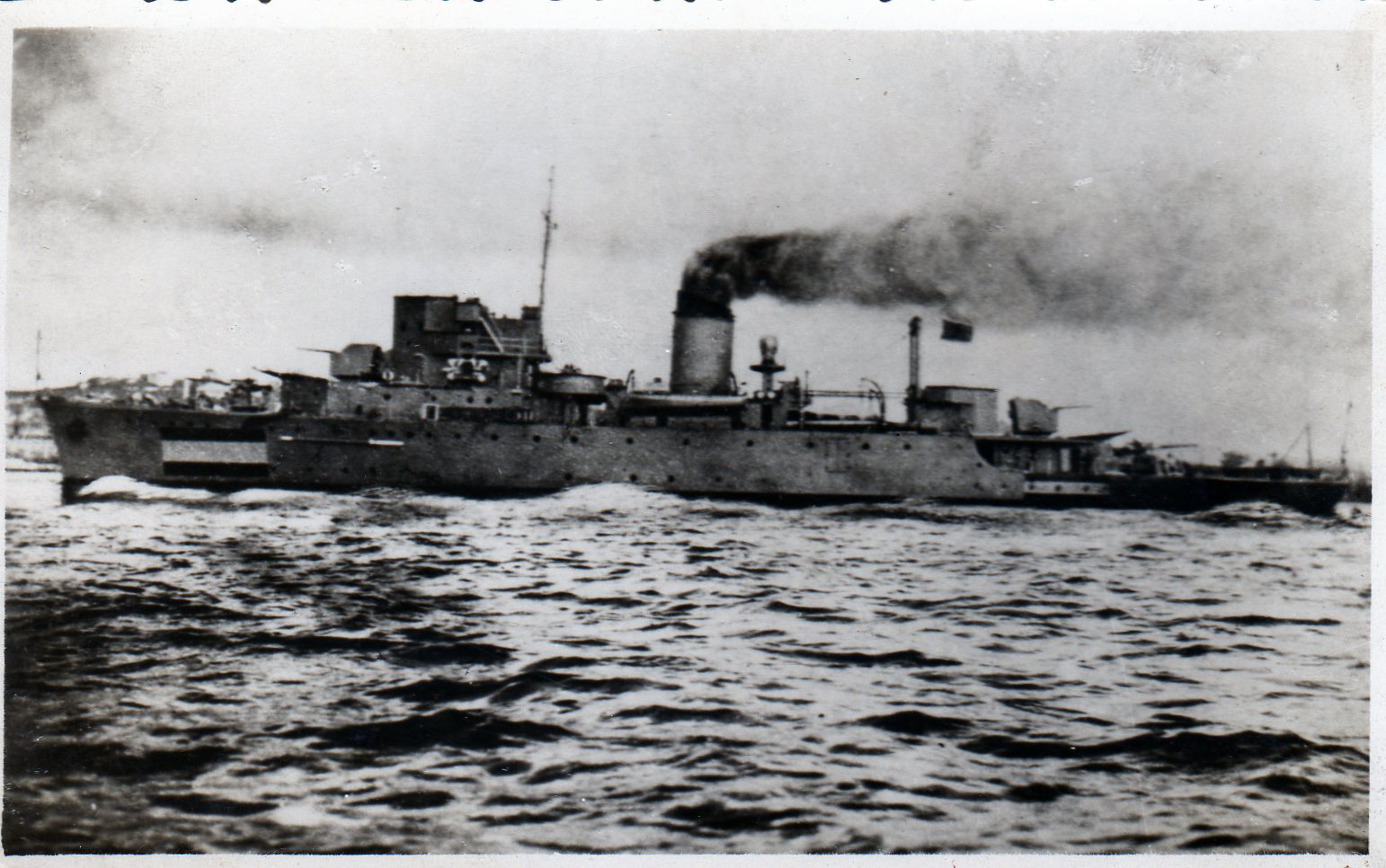
Eolo (F-21)

- F-00 Marte class (2)
  - F-01 Marte (1938–1971)
  - F-02 Neptuno (1939–1972)
- F-10 Júpiter class (Marte modernized*) (2)
  - F-11 Júpiter (1937/1960*-1974)
  - F-12 Vulcano (1937/1960*-1977)
- F-20 Eolo class (2)
  - F-21 Eolo (1941–1972)
  - F-22 Tritón (1943–1972)

== Mine countermeasures vessels ==
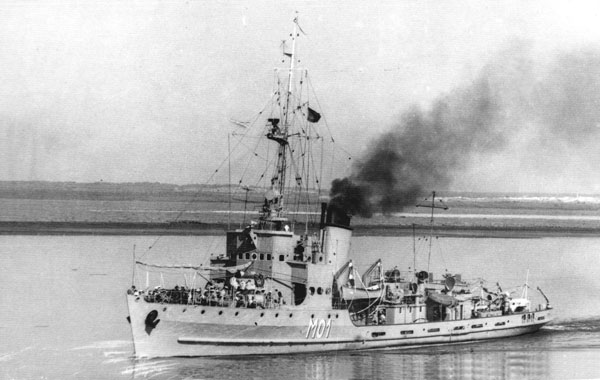
Bidasoa (M-01)

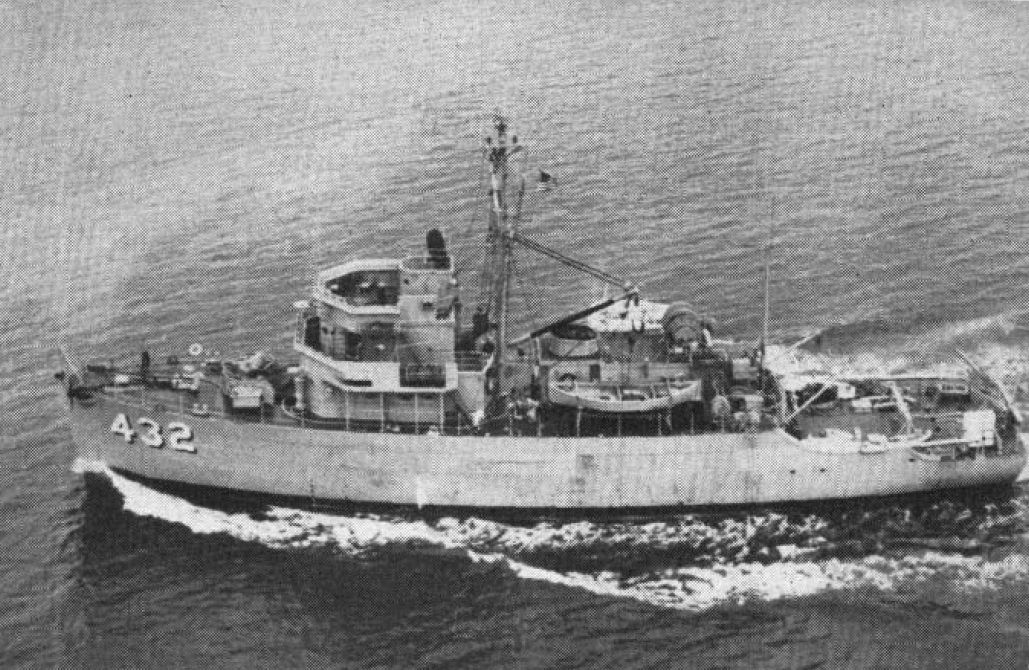
Guadalete (M-41)

- M-00 Bidasoa class minesweepers (7)
  - M-01 Bidasoa (1946–1973)
  - M-02 Nervión (1946–1972)
  - M-03 Lérez (1947–1971)
  - M-04 Tambre (1946–1973)
  - - Guadalete (1946–1954)
  - M-05 Segura (1949–1973)
  - M-06 Ter (1948–1972)
- M-10 Guadiaro class minesweepers (7)
  - M-11 Guadiaro (1953–1977)
  - M-12 Tinto (1953–1976)
  - M-13 Eume (1954–1977)
  - M-14 Almanzora (1954–1977)
  - M-15 Navia (1955–1979)
  - M-16 Eo (1956–1978)
  - M-17 Guadalhorce (1953–1978)
- M-20 Nalón class minesweepers (12)
  - M-21 Nalón (1954–1993) (MSC139) Adjutant class
  - M-22 Llobregat (1954–1979) (MSC143) Bluebird class
  - M-23 Júcar (1956-?) (MSC220) AMS218 class
  - M-24 Ulla (1956–1993) (MSC265) AMS218 class
  - M-25 Miño (1956–1999) (MSC266) AMS218 class
  - M-26 Ebro (1958–2005) (MSC269) MCS268 class
  - M-27 Turia (1955–1993) (MSC130) Adjutant class
  - M-28 Duero (1959-1999 (1954–1999) (ex-MSC202 Spoonbill 1955–1959) Bluebird class
  - M-29 Sil (1959–2003) (ex-MSC200 Redwing 1955–1959) Bluebird class
  - M-30 Tajo (1959–2002) (MSC287) MCS268 class
  - M-31 Genil (1959–2004) (MSC288) MCS268 class
  - M-32 Odiel (1959–2004) (MSC279) MCS268 class
- M40 Aggressive class (4)
  - M-41 Guadalete (1971–1998) (ex-MSO432 Dynamic 1952–1971)
  - M-42 Guadalmedina (1971–1999) (ex-MSO463 Pivot 1954–1971)
  - M-43 Guadalquivir (1971–1999) (ex-MSO491 Persistent 1955–1971)
  - M-44 Guadiana (1972–2000) (ex-MSO473 Vigor 1955–1972)

== Minor sailing vessels (incomplete) ==
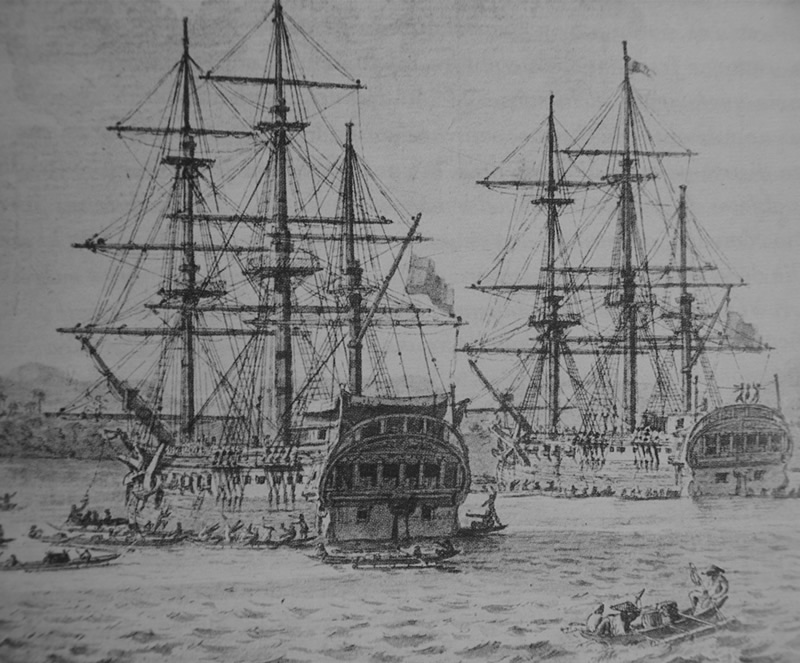
Atrevida and Descubierta

- Atrevida (corvette)
- Descubierta (corvette)
- Favorita (corvette)
- Ferrolana (corvette) (1848–1897)
- Mazarredo (corvette) (1847–1890)
- Mexicana (schooner)
- Princesa (corvette)
- Sutil (schooner)
- Villa de Bilbao (corvette - later used as a school ship) (1845–1930)

== Monitor and floating battery ==
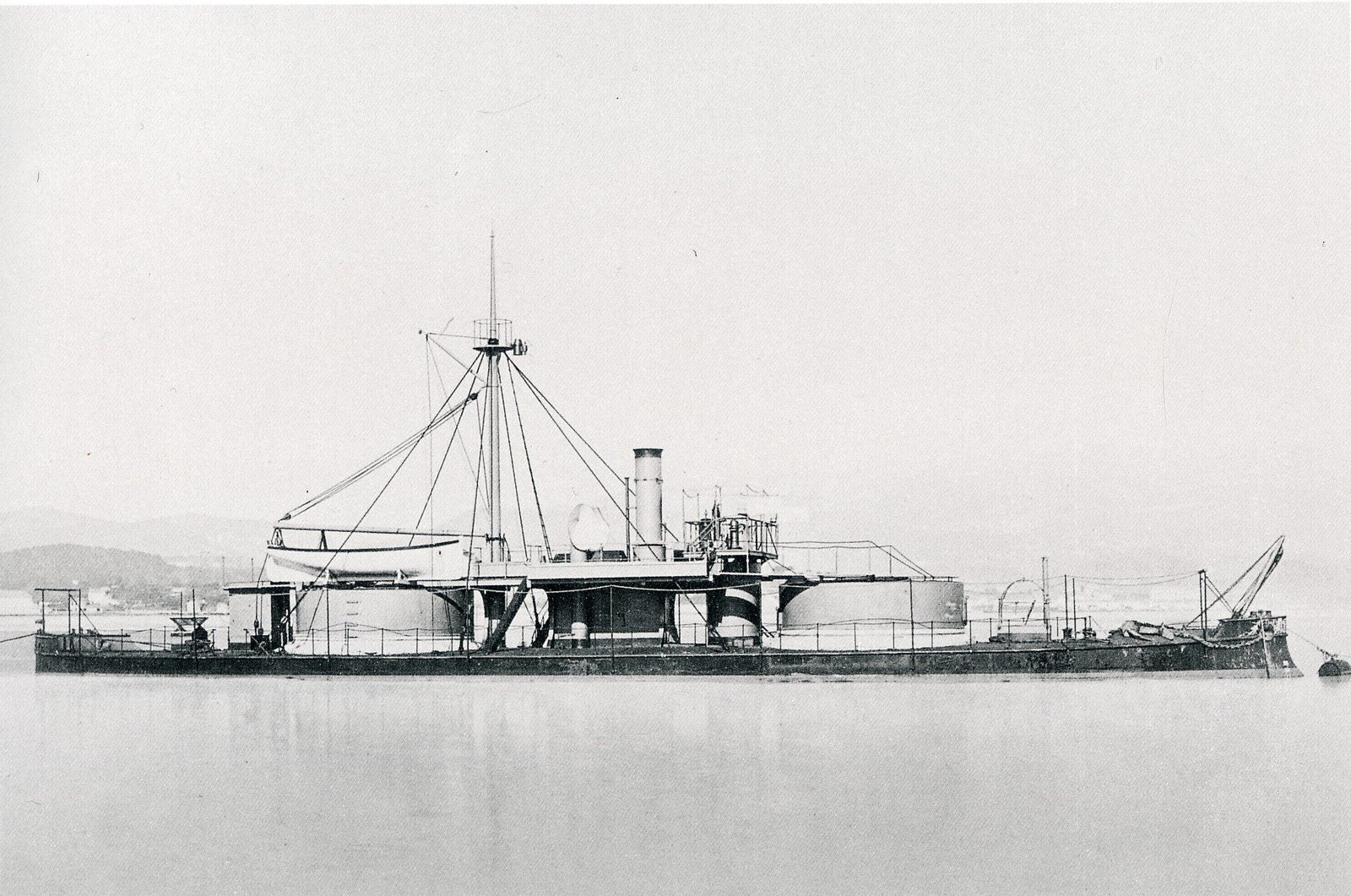
Puigcerdá

- Puigcerdá (1874–1900)
- Duque de Tetuán (1874–1900)

== Paddle steamers ==
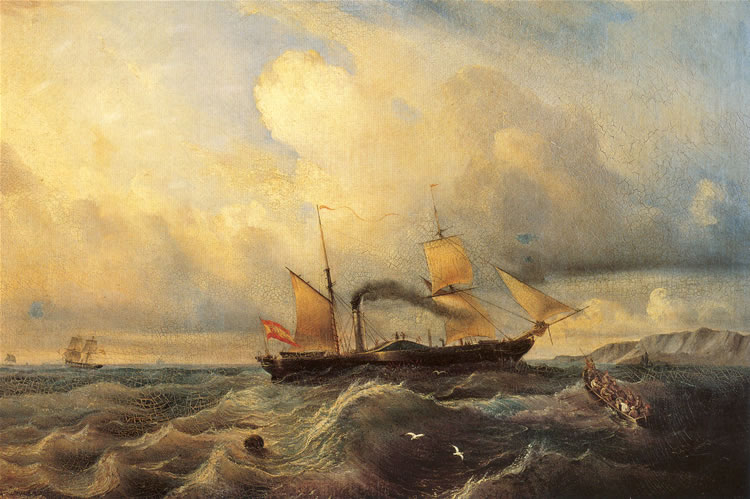
Isabel II.

- Isabel II (ex-British Royal William, purchased 1834) - Renamed Santa Isabel in 1850.
- Don Álvaro de Bazán class (2)
  - Don Álvaro de Bazán.
  - Congreso.
- Andalucía class (2)
  - Andalucía.
  - Península.
- Piles.
- Vulcano.
- Alerta class (2)
  - Alerta.
  - Vigilante.
- Reina de Castilla class (3)
  - Reina de Castilla.
  - Magallanes.
  - Elcano.
- Lepanto.
- León.
- Castilla.
- Satélite.
- Don Juan de Austria.
- Narváez.
- Velasco class (2)
  - Velasco.
  - Conde de Regla.
- Clase Conde de Venadito (4)
  - Conde de Venadito.
  - Neptuno.
  - Guadalquivir.
  - General Lezo.
- General Liniers.
- Churruca.
- Victoria de las Tunas.
- Ferrolano class (2)
  - Ferrolano.
  - Gaditano.
- Blasco de Garay.
- Colón class (2)
  - Colón.
  - Pizarro.
- Antonio Ulloa class (2)
  - Antonio Ulloa.
  - Jorge Juan
- Vasco Nuñes de Balboa class (2)
  - Vasco Núñez de Balboa 1856–1875.
  - Hernán Cortés 1856–1890.
- Isabel II class
  - Isabel II 1850-1882 renamed Ciudad de Cádiz in 1868.
  - Francisco de Asís, 1850, renamed Fernando el Católico in 1856, sunk, boarding by Numancia in 1873.
  - Isabel la Católica. 1850.
  - Fernado el Católico 1850, sunk in Cuba in 1856.

== Patrol boats ==
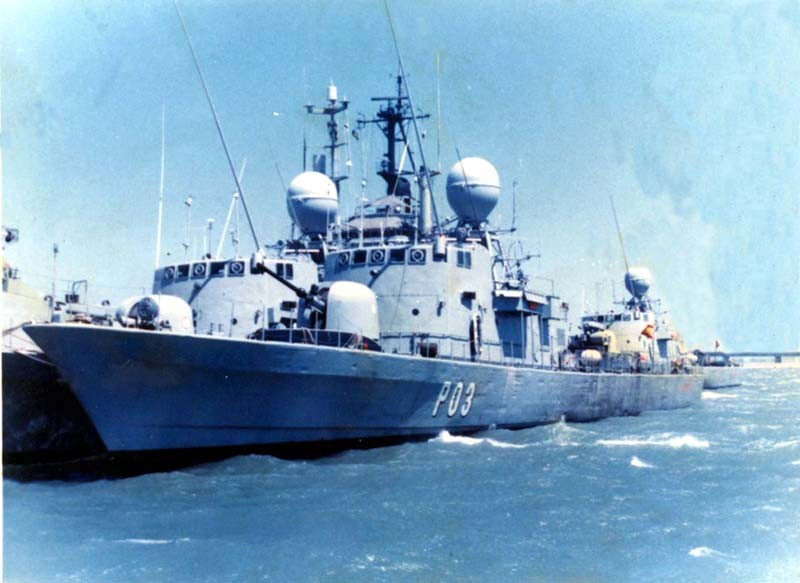
Cadarso (P-03)

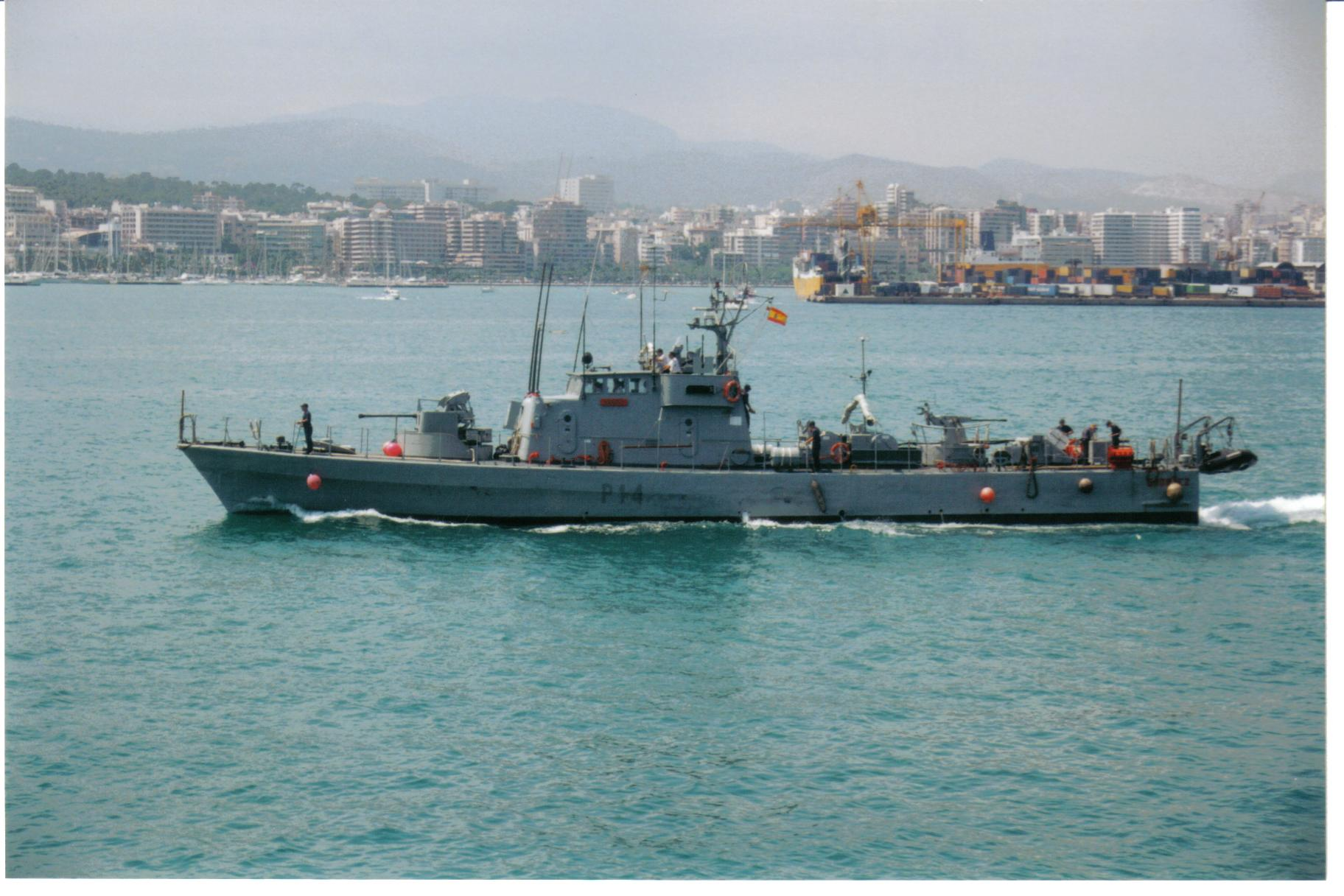
Ordóñez (P-14)

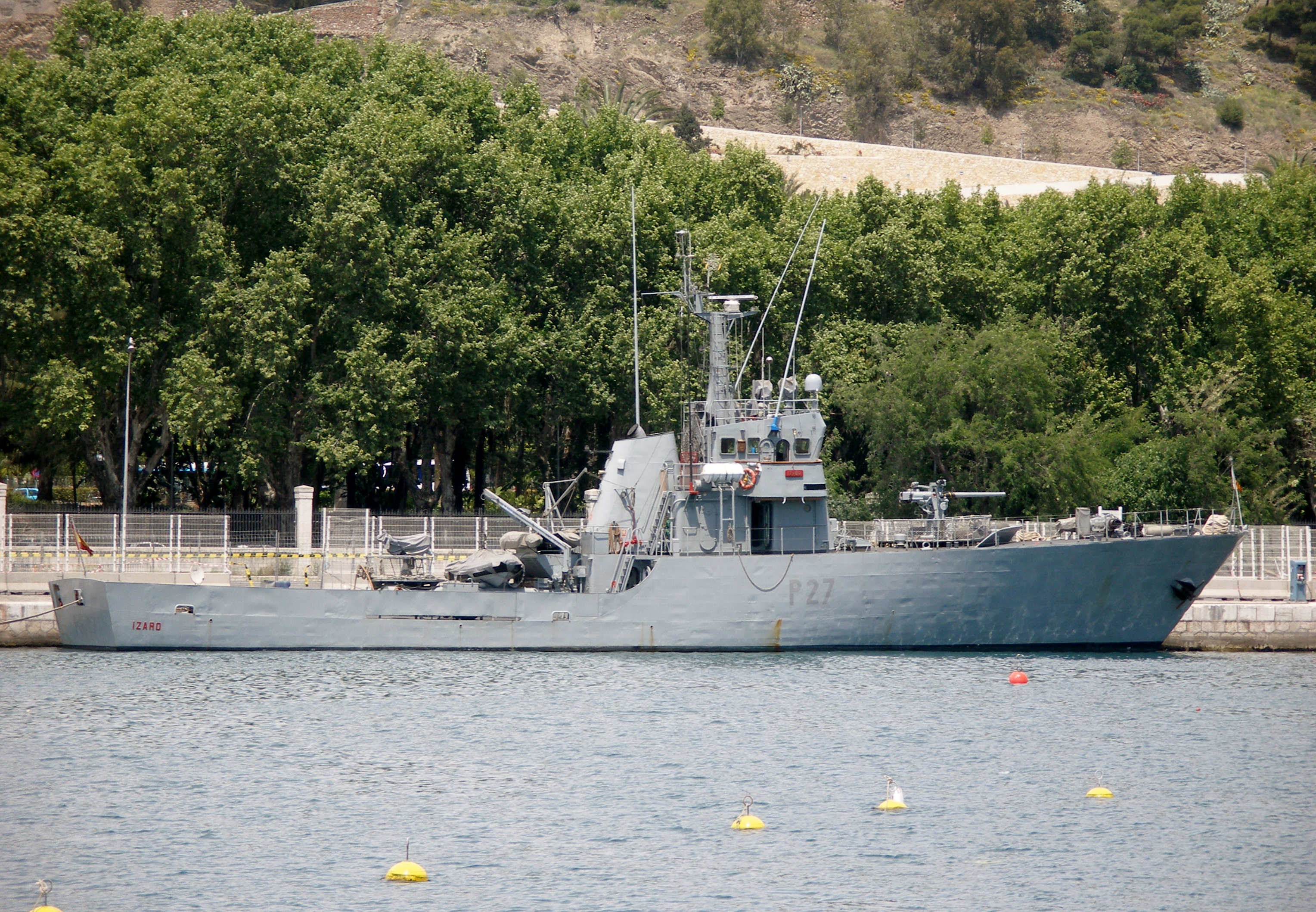
Izaro (P-27)

- Clase Delfín
  - Delfín (1910–1927)
  - Dorado (1910–1929)
  - Gaviota (1910–1932)
- Castle class (naval trawler)
  - Uad Kert. (1922–1967) ex-HMS Rother; ex-HMS Anthony Aslete
  - Uad-Lucus. (1922–1939) ex-HMS Ness, ex-HMS Alexander Palmer
  - Uad-Martin. (1922–1954) ex-HMS Erne, ex-HMS John Chivers
  - Uad Muluya. (1922–1939) ex-HMS Waveney, ex-HMS James Connen
  - Uad-Ras. (1922–1932) ex-HMS Wear, ex-HMS Thomas Mombworth
  - Uad-Targa.(1922–1931) ex-HMS Test, ex-HMS Patrick Bowe
- Mersey class (naval trawler)
  - Arcíla. ex-HMS William Doak (1922-)
  - Xauen. ex-HMS Henry Cramwell (1922-)
- Brisquard class (naval trawler)
  - Alcázar. ex Rengage French (1922–1951)
  - Larache. ex Poliu French (1922–1949) sunk in tres forcas cape
  - Tetuán. ex Grognard French (1922–1952)
- Suboficiales class (fish guards)
  - Condestable Zaragoza (1919-?)
  - Contramaestre Castelló (1919-?)
  - Maquinista Macias (1919-?)
  - Torpedista Hernández (1919-?)
  - Cabo de infantería de Marina Garciolo (1919-?)
  - Marinero Cante (1919-?)
  - Fogonero Bañobre (1919-?)
  - Marinero Jarana (1919-?)
- Rigel class
  - Pegaso (1951–1974)
  - Procyon (1951–1974)
- Cies class
  - Cies (1952–1973)
  - Salvora (1952–1990)
- Centinela class
  - Centinela (W-33) (1953–1977)
  - Serviola (W-34) (1953–1977)
- P-00 Lazaga class (6)
  - P-01 Lazaga (1975–1993)
  - P-02 Alsedo (1977–1993)
  - P-03 Cadarso (1976–1993)
  - P-04 Villaamil (1977–1993)
  - P-05 Bonifaz (1977–1993)
  - P-06 Recalde (1977–1993)
- P-10 Barceló class (6)
  - P-11 Barceló (1976–2009)
  - P-12 Laya (1976–2009)
  - P-13 Javier Quiroga (1977–2005); sold to Tunisia Navy
  - P-14 Ordóñez (1977–2009)
  - P-15 Acevedo (1977–2009)
  - P-16 Candido Perez (1977–2009)
- P-20 Anaga class (7)
  - P-21 Anaga (1980–2010)
  - P-23 Marola (1981–2010)
  - P-24 Mouro (1981–2010)
  - P-25 Grosa (1981–2012)
  - P-27 Izaro (1981–2010)
  - P-29 Deva (1982–2004)
  - P-30 Bergantín (1982–2010)
- P-30 Conejera class (4)
  - P-31 Conejera (1981–2010); Sold to Senegal
  - P-32 Dragonera (1981–2010); Sold to Mozambique
  - P-33 Espalmador (1982–2010)
  - P-34 Alcanada (1982–2010)
- P-40 Cormorán class (1)
  - P-41 Cormorán (1990–1994)
- P-60 Chilreu class (1)
  - P-61 Chilreu (1992–2012)
- P-80 Toralla class (1)
  - P-81 Toralla (1987–2026)
- P-100 Aresa class (1)
  - P-101 (1978–2020)
  - P-111 (1975–2009)

== Sail frigates ==
- List of sail frigates

== Screw frigates ==
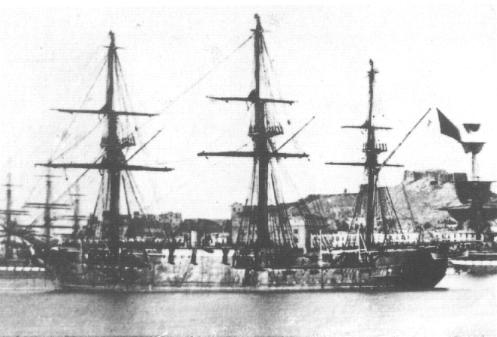
Mendez Nuñez

- Petronila class
  - Berenguela 1857–1877.
  - Petronila 1857–1863.
  - Reina Blanca 1859-1882/93. Renamed Blanca
- Princesa de Asturias 1859–1908. Renamed Cartagena and then Asturias in 1868, sold for scrap in 1909.
- Concepción class
  - Concepción 1861–1897.
  - Nuestra Señora del Carmén 1862–1897. Renamed Carmén
- Lealtad class
  - Lealtad 1861–1893, scrapped in 1897.
  - Nuestra Señora del Triunfo 1862–1864, burned.
  - Resolución 1862–1868, rebuilt as ironclad Mendez Nuñez 1867–1870.
- Villa de Madrid 1863–1882/84.
- Gerona 1864–1898.
- Almansa 1864-1888/98.
- Navas de Tolosa 1865–1893.

== Screw corvettes ==
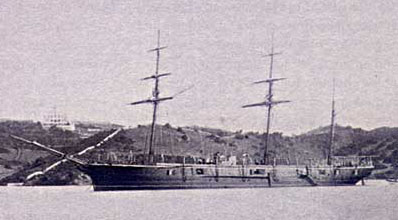
Tornado

- Narváez class
  - Narváez
  - Vencedora (1862–1888)
  - Consuelo
  - Wad-Ras
  - África
  - Santa Lucía
  - Diana (1867–1897)
- Tornado (ex-Pampero, captured 1866)
- Doña María de Molina (1869–1886)

== Screw schooners ==
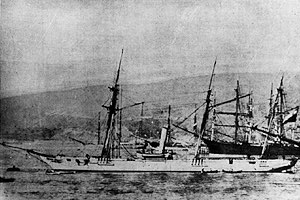
Covadonga

- Covadonga class
  - Virgen de Covadonga Captured by Chile 1865, renamed Covadonga, sunk by Peruvian explosive boat 1880
  - Circe
  - Sirena
  - Andaluza
  - Guadiana
  - Huelva
  - Ligera
  - Favorita
- Santa Filomena class
  - Santa Filomena.
  - Valiente.
  - Constancia.
  - Animosa.
- Santa Teresa class
  - Santa Teresa.
  - Isabel Francisca.
  - Buenaventura.
  - Concordia.
  - Santa Rosalía.
  - Edetana.
  - Céres.
  - Caridad.
  - Prosperidad (1865-).

== Ships of the line ==
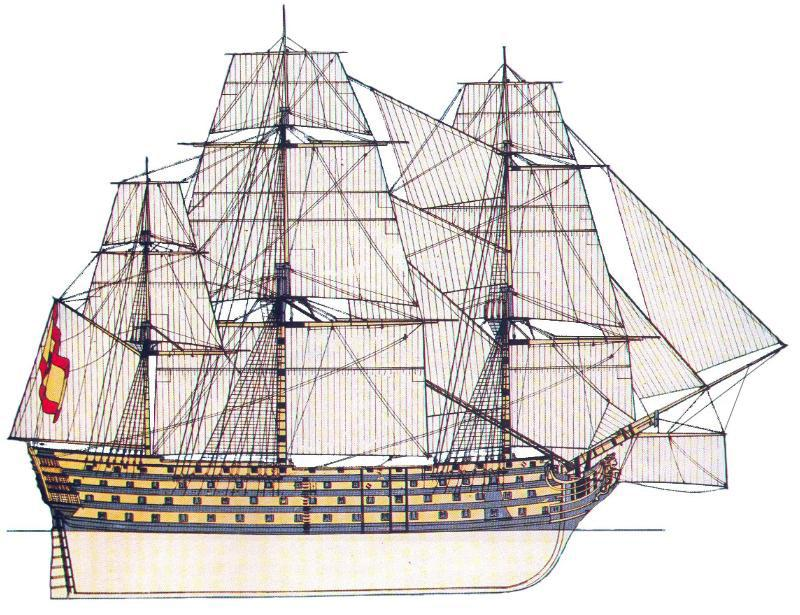
Santísima Trinidad

- List of ships of the line (1640–1858)

== Submarines ==
- List of submarines of the Spanish Navy

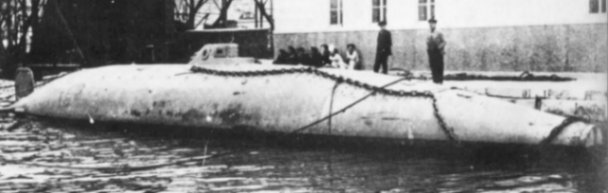
Peral

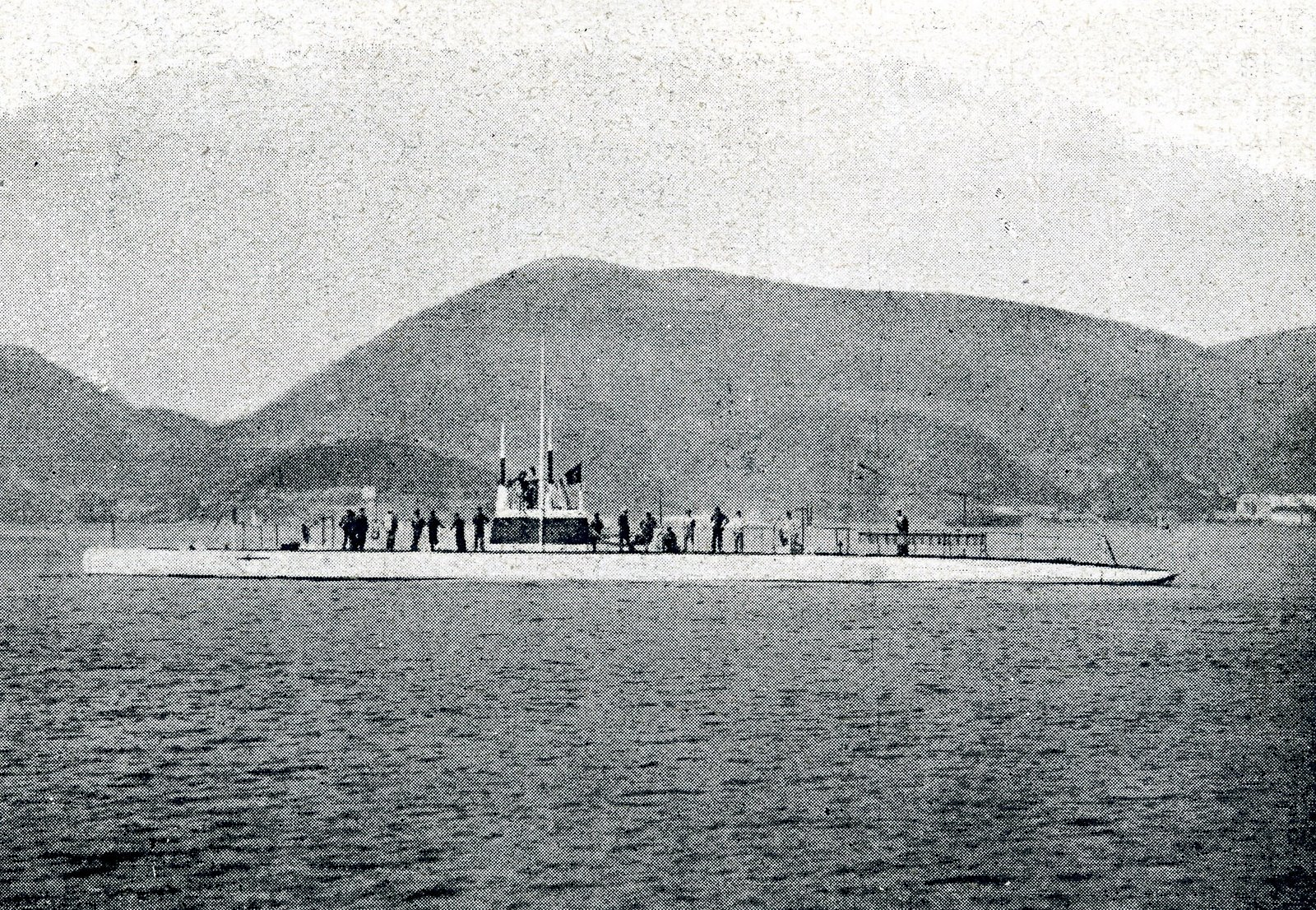
A-2 Cosme Garcia

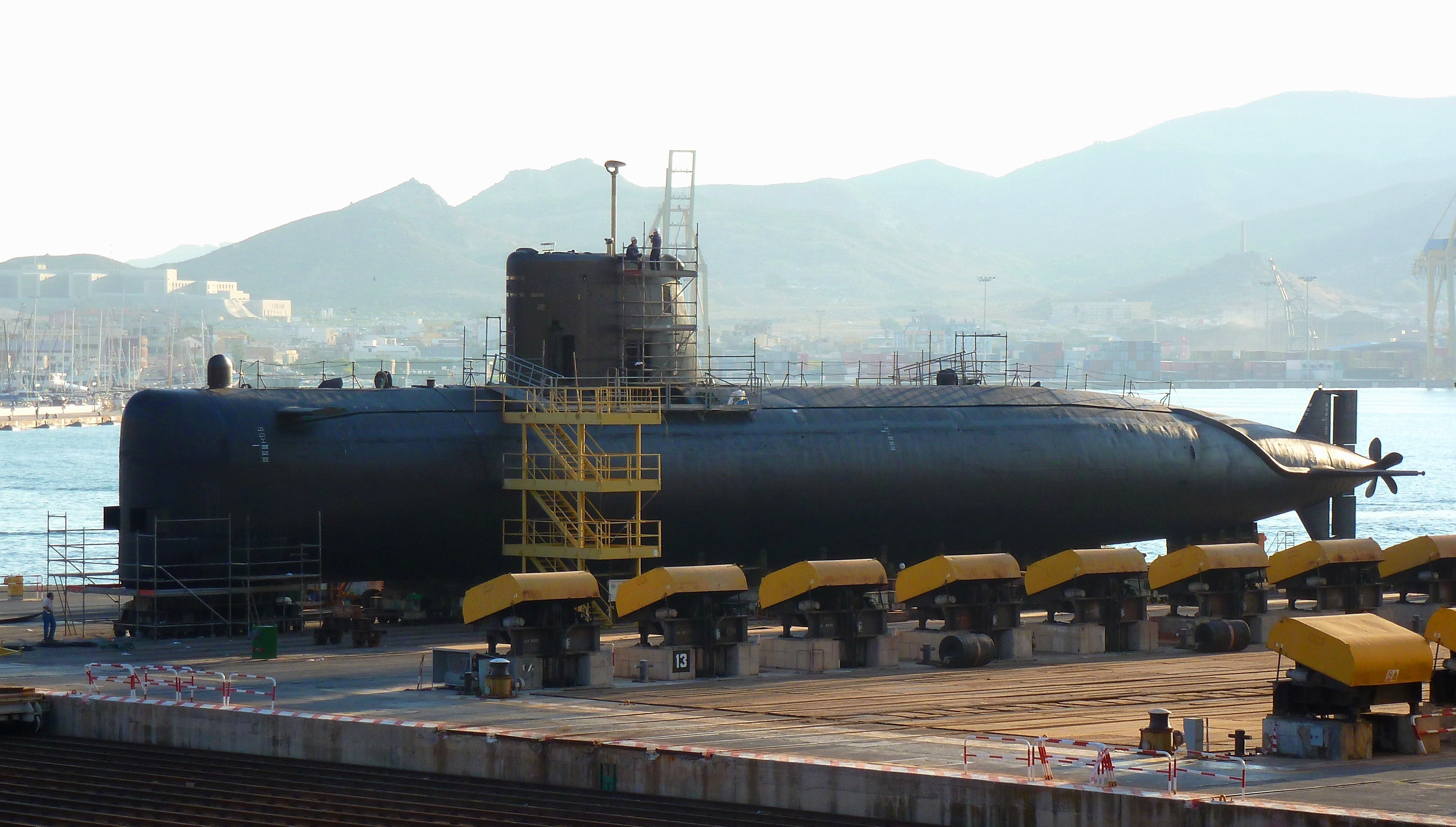
Mistral (S-73)

- Isaac Peral's submarine torpedo boat (1)
  - Peral (1888–1890)
- Isaac Peral class (1)
  - Isaac Peral (A-0) (1917–1930) (Holland type similar to USS M-1)
- A class F/Laurenti (3)
  - Narcíso Monturiol (A-1) (1917–1934)
  - Cosme García (A-2) (1917–1931)
  - A-3 (1917–1932)
- B class Holland F-105 (6)
  - B-1 (1921–1941)
  - B-2 (1922–1951)
  - B-3 (1922–1940)
  - B-4 (1923–1937)
  - B-5 (1925–1936)
  - B-6 (1926–1936)
- C class Holland F-105 (6)
  - C-1 (renamed Isaac Peral (C-1) in 1930) (1928–1948)
  - C-2 (1928–1951)
  - C-3 (1929–1936)
  - C-4 (1929–1946)
  - C-5 (1930–1936)
  - C-6 (1930–1937)
- Archimede class (2)
  - General Mola (1937–1958) (ex-Evangelista Torricelli 1934–1937)
  - General Sanjurjo (1937–1959) (ex-Archimede 1935–1937)
- S-10 D class (1)
  - S-11 (1947–1965)
  - S-21 (1951–1971)
  - S-22 (1954–1971)
- S-01 G Class Type VIIC (1)
  - S-01 G-7 (1942–1970) (ex-U-573 1941–1942)
- S-30 Balao class (5)
  - S-31 Almirante García de los Reyes (1959–1982) (ex-USS Kraken (SS-370) 1944–1959)
  - S-32 Isaac Peral (1971–1980) (ex-USS Ronquil (SS-396) 1944–1971)
  - S-33 Narciso Monturiol (1972–1973) (ex-USS Picuda (SS-382) 1943–1972)
  - S-34 Cosme García (1972–1980) (ex-USS Bang (SS-385) 1943–1972)
  - S-35 Narciso Monturiol (1973–1980) (ex-USS Jallao (SS-368) 1944–1974)
- SA-40 Foca class (2)
  - SA-41 (1963–1967) Preserved as museum ship at Mahon.
  - SA-42 (1963–1967) Preserved as museum ship at Cartagena.
- SA-50 Tiburón class (2)
  - SA-51 (1965–1979) Preserved as museum ship at Barcelona.
  - SA-52 (1966–1979) Preserved as museum ship at Cartagena.
- S-60 Delfín class (4)
  - S-61 Delfín (1973–2003) Since 2004 museum ship in Torrevieja
  - S-62 Tonina (1973–2005) Awaiting destination, possible museum ship
  - S-63 Marsopa (1975–2006)
  - S-64 Narval (1975–2003)
- S-70 Agosta class (2)
  - S-72 Siroco (1983–2012)
  - S 73 Mistral (1985–2020)
  - S-74 Tramontana (1985–2024)

== Torpedo gunboat ==
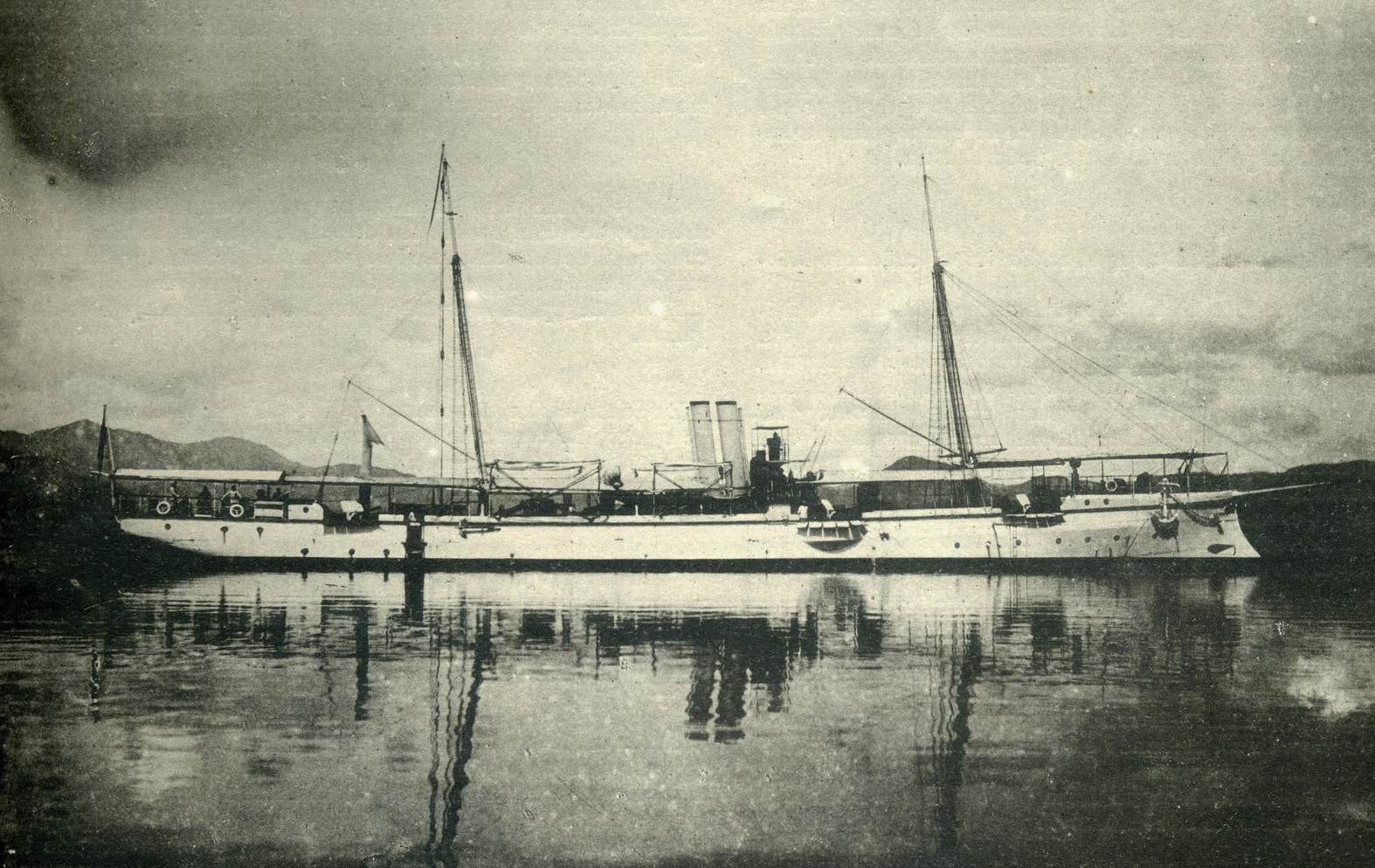
Galicia

- Temerario class
  - Temerario (1892–1916)
  - Nueva España (1894–1914)
  - Martín Alonso Pinzón (1893–1911)
  - Galicia (1894–1899)
  - Marqués de Molins (1895–1921)
  - Vicente Yañez Pinzón (1894–1902)
- Clase Filipinas
  - Filipinas (1895–1899)

== Torpedo boats ==
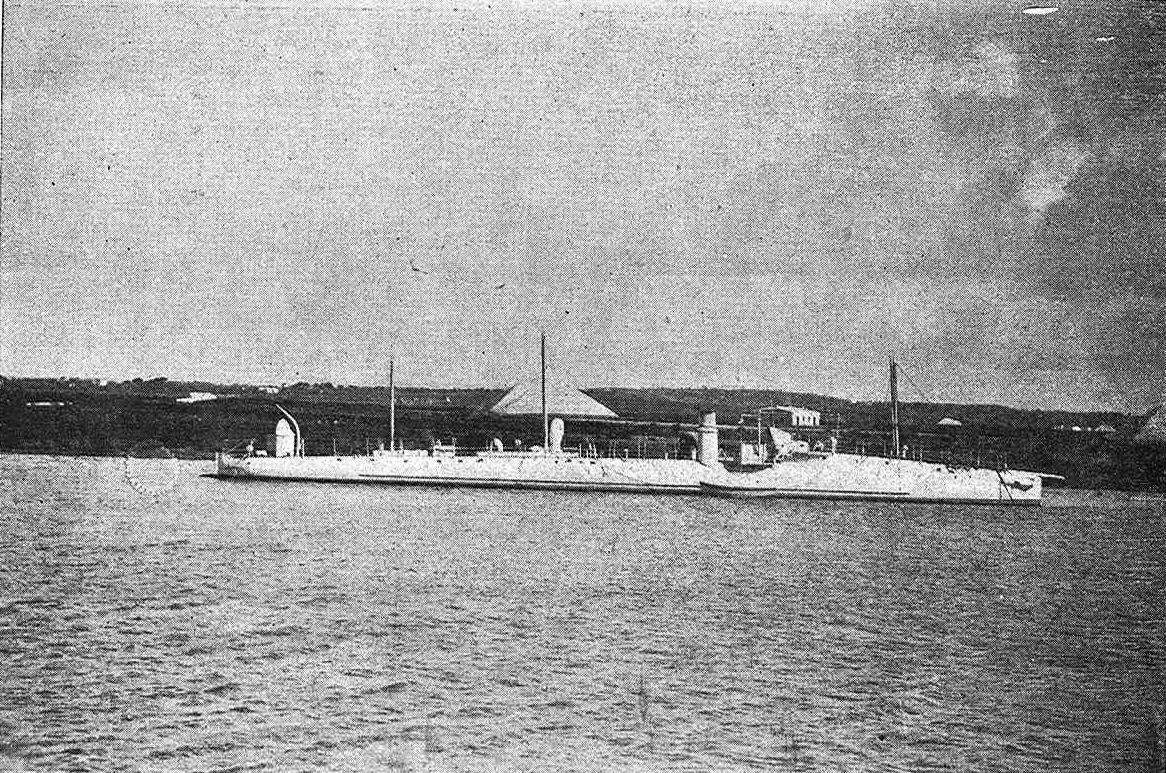
Barceló

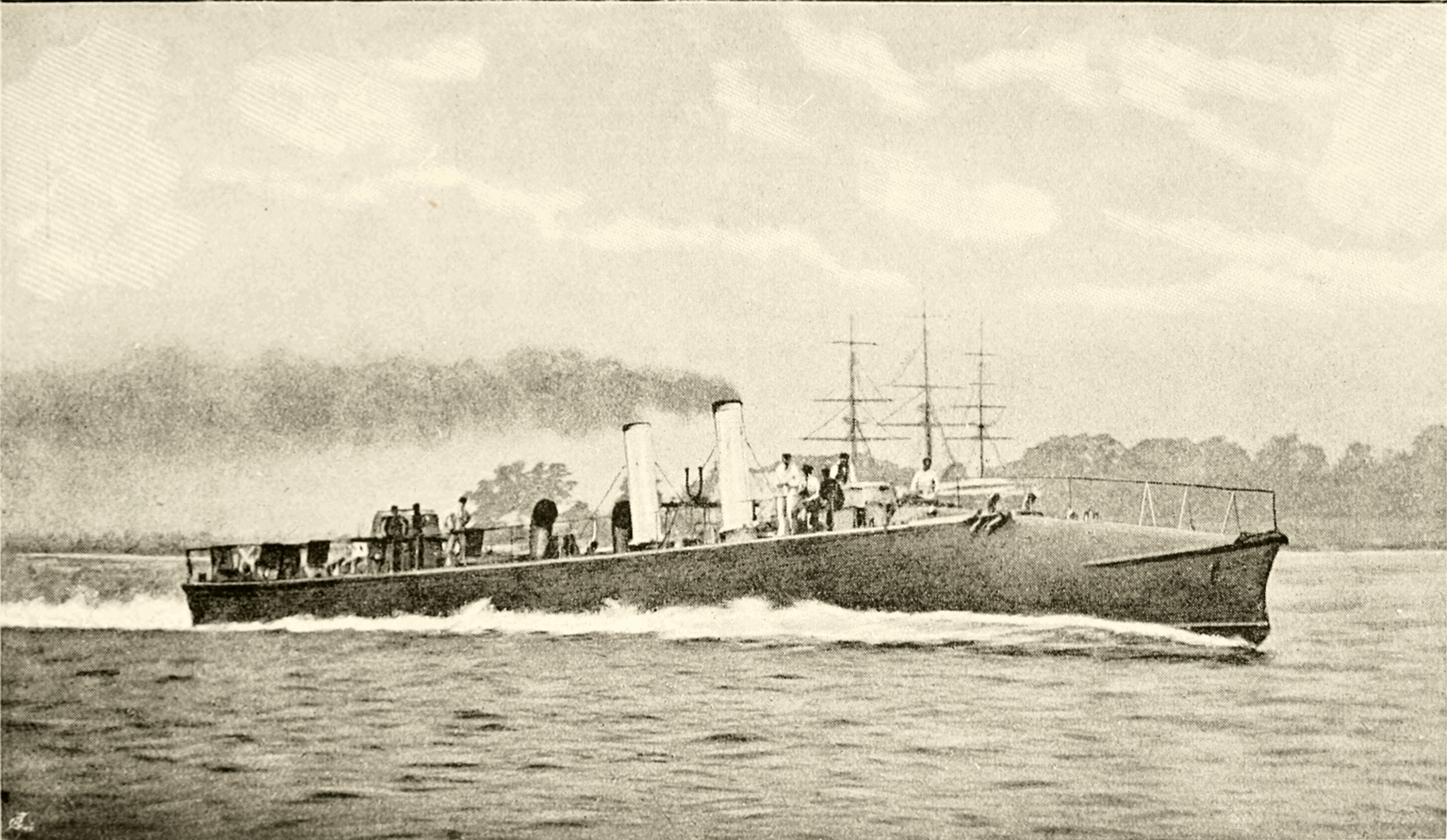
Ariete

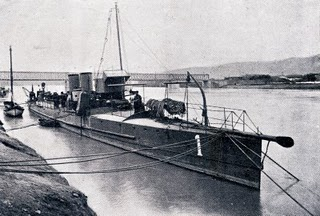
Torpedero T-1

- Cástor class
  - Cástor (1878–1900)
- Pólux class
  - Pólux (1879–1895)
- Rigel class
  - Rigel (1883–1900)
- Julian Ordoñez class
  - Julián Ordóñez (1885–1913)
  - Acevedo (1885–1913)
- Retamosa class
  - Retamosa (1885–1900)
- Orión class
  - Orión (1886–1915)
- Barceló class
  - Barceló (1886–1911)
- Habana class
  - Habana (1886–1919)
- Azor class
  - Azor (1887–1911)
  - Halcón (1887–1915)
- Ariete class
  - Ariete (1887–1905)
  - Rayo (1887–1905)
- Ejército class
  - Ejército (1888–1900)
- T-1 class
  - T-1 (1912–1940)
  - T-2 (1912–1939)
  - T-3 (1912–1937)
  - T-4 (1913–1939)
  - T-5 (1913–1931)
  - T-6 (1914–1934)
  - T-7 (1915–1946)
  - T-8 (1915–1932)
  - T-9 (1915–1943)
  - T-10 (1915–1932)
  - T-11 (1916–1931)
  - T-12 (1916–1932)
  - T-13 (1916–1932)
  - T-14 (1916–1952)
  - T-15 (1917–1935)
  - T-16 (1917–1941)
  - T-17 (1917–1952)
  - T-18 (1918–1939)
  - T-19 (1920–1941)
  - T-20 (1920–1940)
  - T-21 (1921–1940)
  - T-22 (1921–1940)
- G5 class
  - 11 (1937–1946) renamed LT-15 after Spanish Civil War
  - 21 (1937–1946) renamed LT-16 after Spanish Civil War
  - 31 (1937–1938)
  - 41 (1937-1937)
- Schnellboote S-1 class
  - Badajoz (LT-15) (1937–1944) ex S-1 German
  - Falange (LT-13) (1936–1937) ex S-2 German
  - Oviedo (LT-12) (1937–1940) ex S-3 German
  - Requeté (LT-11) (1936–1946) ex S-4 German
  - Toledo (LT-14) (1939–1944) ex S-5 German
- MAS
  - Sicilia (LT-18) (1937-?) ex MAS 100 Italian.
  - Nápoles (LT-19) (1937-?) ex MAS 223 Italian.
  - Cándido Pérez (LT-16) (1937-?) ex MAS 435 Italian.
  - Javier Quiroga (LT-17) (1937-1937) ex MAS 436 Italian.
- Schnellboote S-38 class
  - German construction
    - LT-21 (1943–1956) Ex S-73 German
    - LT-22 (1943–1956) Ex S-78 German
    - LT-23 (1943–1956) Ex S-124 German
    - LT-24 (1943–1955) Ex S-125 German
    - LT-25 (1943–1955) Ex S-126 German
    - LT-26 (1943–1957) Ex S-145 German
  - Spanish construction
    - LT-27 (1953–1963)
    - LT-28 (1953–1963)
    - LT-29 (1953–1961)
    - LT-30 (1953–1977)
    - LT-31 (1956–1977)
    - LT-32 (1959–1974)

== Preserved ships ==
Some preserved Spanish submarines
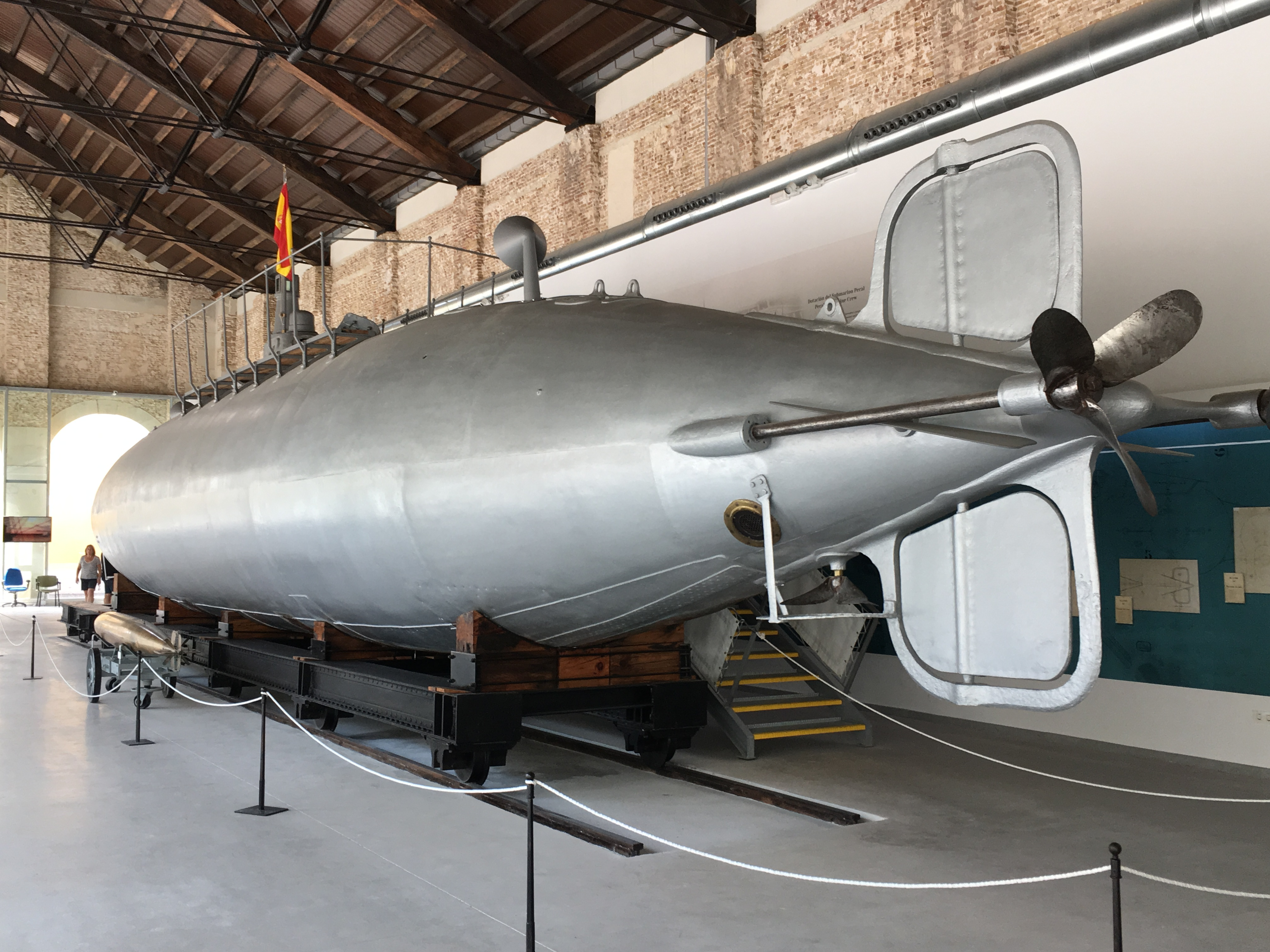
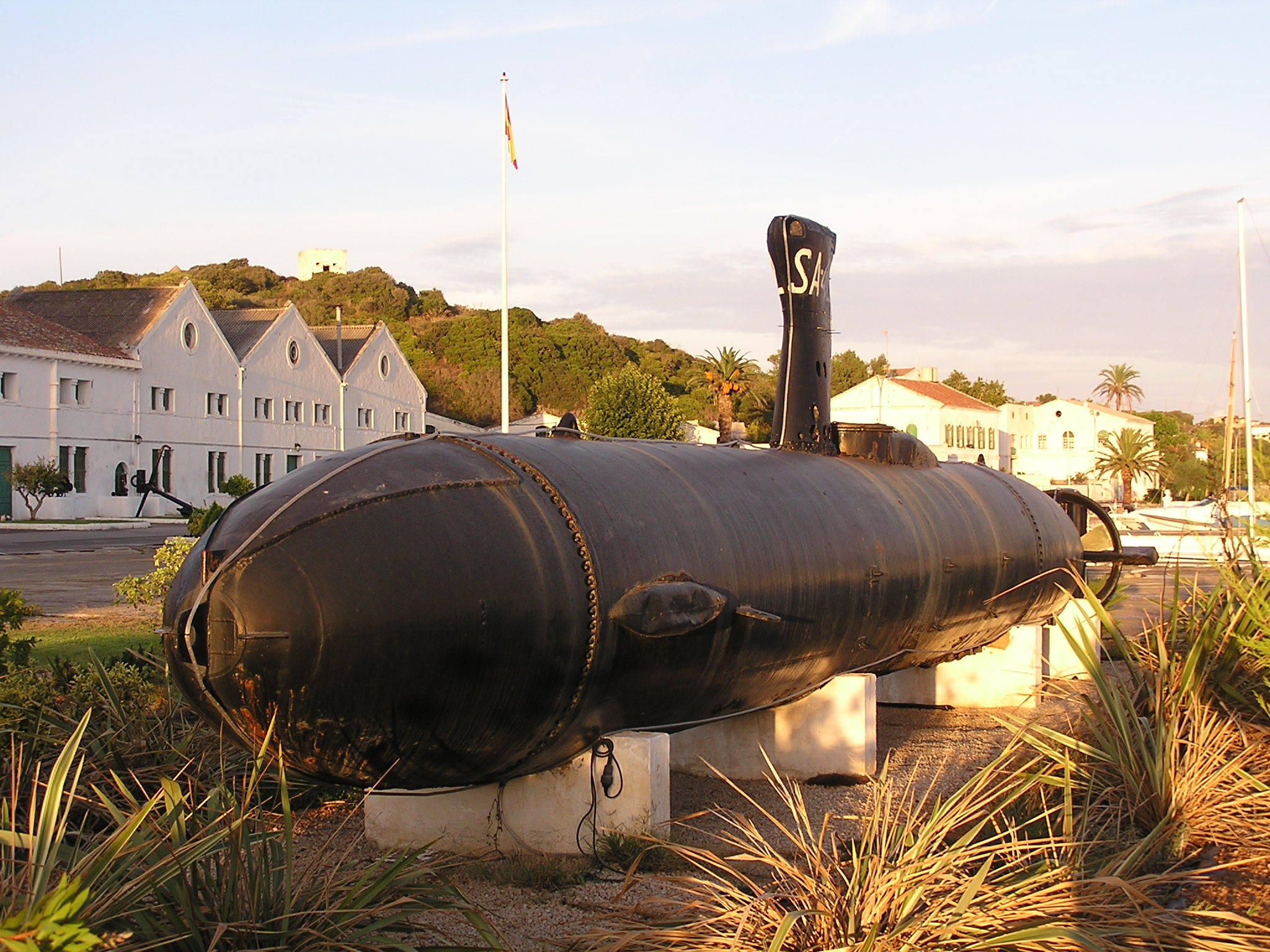
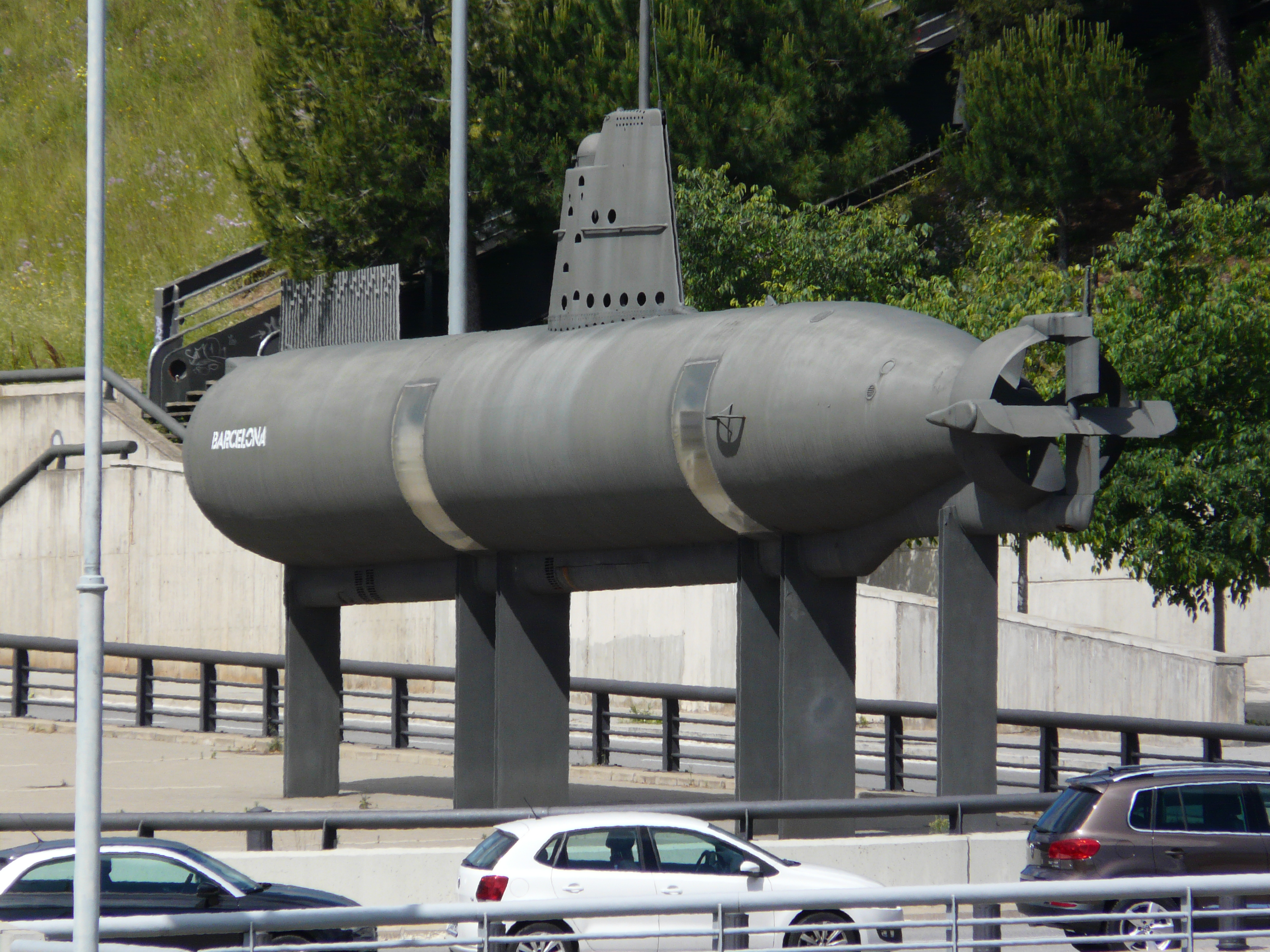
From left to right: Peral in Cartagena, SA-41 of the Foca class in Mahón and SA-51 of the Tiburón-class in Barcelona.

Retired Spanish Navy ships preserved as museum ships include:

- The submarine Peral of 1888 is preserved at Cartagena in Murcia.
- Two Foca class submarines, SA-41 at Mahón on Menorca in the Balearic Islands and SA-42 at Cartagena in Murcia.
- Two Tiburón class submarines,SA-51 at Barcelona (Catalonia) and SA-52 at Cartagena in Murcia.
- The Daphné class submarine Delfín (S-61) at Torrevieja in the Province of Alicante in the Valencian Community. Unlike the other preserved submarines, she is not on land but is moored in the port, thus becoming the first "floating museum" of its kind in Spain.
- The Customs Surveillance Service patrol vessel Albatros III is preserved at Torrevieja.
- Galatea, a barque that was a training ship for the Spanish Navy between 1922 and 1982, is preserved at Glasgow, Scotland, in the United Kingdom.

A replica of the officers′ cabin of the armoured frigate Numancia opened to the public on 7 September 1946 at the Pazo de García Flórez in Pontevedra, Spain.

== See also ==
- Spanish Republican Navy
- List of active Spanish Navy ships
- List of future Spanish Navy ships
