= Atrevida-class corvette =

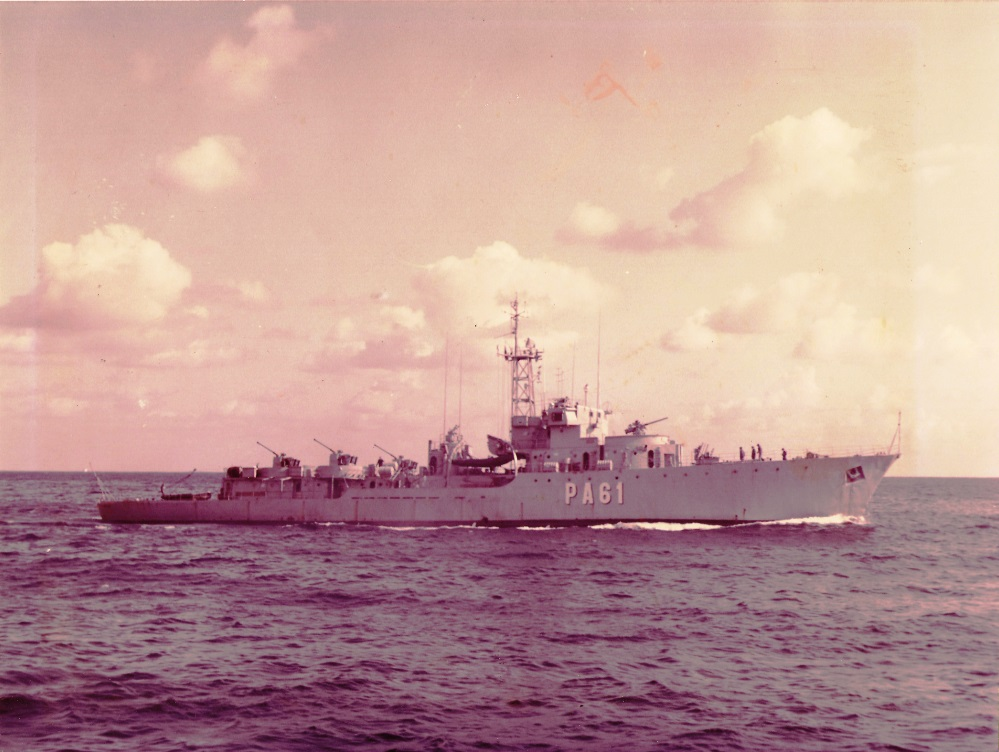
- Atrevida after classification as a patrol vessel

Class overview
- Builders: Bazán, Cartagena and Cádiz
- Operators: Spanish Navy
- Succeeded by: Serviola-class patrol boat
- Built: 1950–1960
- In commission: 1954–1992
- Completed: 6
- Scrapped: 6

General characteristics
- Type: Corvette
- Displacement: 927 t (912 long tons) standard
- Length: 75.5 m (247 ft 8 in) o/a
- Beam: 10.2 m (33 ft 6 in)
- Draught: 2.6 m (8 ft 6 in)
- Installed power: 2,200 kW (3,000 shp)
- Propulsion: 2 × Sulzer diesel engines
- Speed: 18.5 knots (34.3 km/h; 21.3 mph)
- Range: 8,000 nmi (15,000 km; 9,200 mi)
- Complement: 132
- Armament: 1 × 105 mm (4.1 in) gun; 2 × 37 mm anti-aircraft guns; 12 × 20 mm anti-aircraft guns; 20 mines; Depth charges

The Atrevida class was a class of six corvettes built for the Spanish Navy in the 1950s.

== Design and construction ==
In 1945, the Spanish State drew up a large construction programme to re-equip the Spanish Navy, which had many old and worn out ships, as shipbuilding had ground to a near halt during the Spanish Civil War and the Second World War. The programme included 18 destroyers, (Note: The Oquendo class and Audaz class) six corvettes, six submarines together with motor-torpedo boats and patrol vessels.

The corvettes, the Atrevida class, were 75.5 metres (247 ft 8 in) long overall and 68 metres (223 ft 1 in) between perpendiculars, with a beam of 10.2 metres (33 ft 6 in) and a draught of 2.6 metres (8 ft 6 in). Displacement was 927 tonnes (912 long tons) standard and 1,038 tonnes (1,022 long tons) full load. Two Sulzer diesel engines rated at a total of 3,000 shaft horsepower (2,200 kW) drove two propeller shafts, giving a speed of 18.5 knots (34.3 km/h; 21.3 mph). 100 tons of oil were carried, given a range of 8,000 nautical miles (15,000 km; 9,200 mi) at 10 knots (19 km/h; 12 mph).

As designed, the ships had a gun armament of one 105 mm (4.1 in) dual-purpose gun, backed up by a close-in anti-aircraft armament of two 37 mm guns (in one twin mount) and twelve 20 mm anti-aircraft guns (in three quadruple mounts). Four depth-charge throwers were fitted, and 20 mines could be carried. The ship had a crew of 132.

Construction of the first two ships of the class, Atrevida and Descubierta began at Bazán's (now Navantia) Cartagena shipyard in 1950, but economic problems slowed construction, and the remaining ships were not laid down until 1953. The first two ships were completed in 1954–1955, but US Mutual Defense Assistance Programme funding allowed the remaining four ships to be completed with modernised armament and sensors more suitable for anti-submarine warfare. The 105 mm gun was replaced by a single US 3-inch (76 mm) Mark 26 semi-automatic anti-aircraft gun, with short range anti-aircraft armament consisting of three 40mm Bofors L/70 guns. Anti-submarine armament consisted of two Hedgehog anti-submarine mortars, supplemented by eight depth charge mortars and two depth charge racks. Sensors consisted of SPS-5B surface search radar and QHBa sonar. Displacement increased to 1,013 tonnes (997 long tons) standard and 1,153 tonnes (1,135 long tons) full load. The four ships still under construction completed in 1959–1960, with Atrevida converting to the revised standard in 1960.

== Service ==
The unmodified Descubierta was stricken in 1971, (Note: Conway's states Descubierta was stricken in 1978.) with Diana in 1973. (Note: Combat Fleets states Diana was stricken in 1972.) It was planned to withdraw Atrevida and Villa de Bilbao from service in 1979, but instead, all four ships were refitted for patrol work. Their sonar and anti-submarine armament was removed and they were redesignated as Patrullero de Altura (PA). They patrolled in the Atlantic between Gibraltar and the Canary Islands until replaced by Serviola-class patrol boats from 1991. The last of the class, Atrevida, was stricken in 1992.

== Ships ==
Name	Pennant Number (Note: From 1961.)	Built by	Laid down	Launched	Completed	Fate
Atrevida	F61	Bazán, Cartagena	26 June 1950	2 December 1952	19 August 1954	Stricken 1992
Descubierta	F51	Bazán, Cartagena	26 June 1950	9 June 1952	1 February 1955	Stricken 1971
Diana	F63	Bazán, Cartagena	27 July 1953	29 April 1955	13 May 1960	Stricken 1973
Nautilus	F64	Bazán, Cádiz	27 July 1953	23 August 1956	15 December 1959	Stricken 1991
Princesa	F62	Bazán, Cartagena	18 March 1953	31 March 1956	3 October 1959	Stricken 1991; sunk as target 17 November 1992
Villa de Bilbao (Note: ex-Favorita)	F65	Bazán, Cádiz	18 March 1953	19 February 1958	2 July 1960	Stricken 1991

== Sources ==
- Blackman, Raymond V. B. (1960). Jane's Fighting Ships 1960–61. London: Sampson Low, Marston & Co., Ltd.
- Blackman, Raymond V. B. (1962). Jane's Fighting Ships 1962–63. London: Sampson Low, Marston & Co., Ltd.
- Blackman, Raymond V. B. (1971). Jane's Fighting Ships 1971–72. London: Sampson Low, Marston & Co., Ltd. ISBN 0-354-00096-9.
- Couhat, Jean Labayle; Baker, A. D., eds. (1986). Combat Fleets of the World 1986/87. Annapolis, Maryland, USA: Naval Institute Press. ISBN 0-85368-860-5.
- Gardiner, Robert; Chumbley, Stephen, eds. (1995). Conway's All the World's Fighting Ships 1947–1995. Annapolis, Maryland, USA: Naval Institute Press. ISBN 1-55750-132-7.
- Moore, John, ed. (1979). Jane's Fighting Ships 1979–80. London: Jane's Yearbooks. ISBN 0-354-00587-1.
- Prézelin, Bernard; Baker, A. D., eds. (1990). The Naval Institute Guide to Combat Fleets of the World 1990/91. Annapolis, Maryland, USA: Naval Institute Press. ISBN 0-87021-250-8.
