= Spanish ship Poseidon =

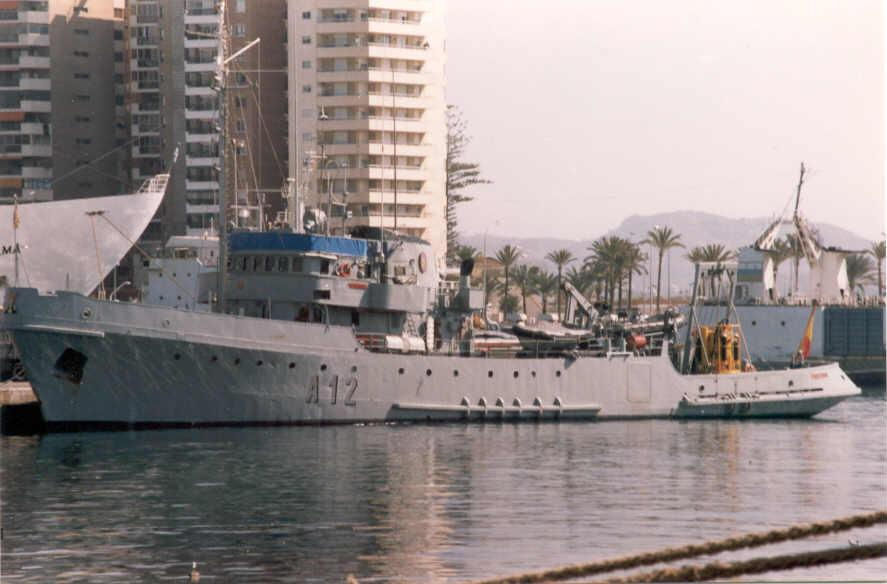
- Poseidón

History
- Name: Poseidón
- Namesake: Poseidon, Greek god of sea
- Builder: Bazán Military Naval Constructions SA
- Laid down: 21 March 1962
- Launched: 8 August 1964
- Commissioned: Spain 8 August 1964 Mauritania:17 January 2000
- Decommissioned: Spain March 1999 Mauritania: February 2011
- Fate: Sunk near Nouakchott 2011

General characteristics
- Displacement: 1069 t full
- Length: 55.9 m
- Beam: 10 m
- Draft: 4 m
- Propulsion: 2 Sulzer diesel engines, 3,200 horse power
- Speed: 15 knots (28 km/h)
- Range: 4,640 nautical miles
- Complement: 60
- Sensors & processing systems: Navigation radar Decca TM 626, band I.

Poseidon (A-12) was a salvage and support vessel for submarines of the Spanish Navy, ceded in 2000 to Mauritania where it served with the name Voum-Legleita (B-551) until its sinking in February 2011.
