= Net cutter =

Net cutter means various devices used to cut nets:

- Net cutter (fisheries patrol), used by some fisheries patrol vessels to cut intruding trawlers' net lines
- Net cutter (diver), a small handheld tool carried by scuba divers to extricate themselves if trapped in fishing net or fishing line.
- Net cutter (submarine), a device mounted on the bows of some naval submarines to cut through anti-submarine netting.
- Net cutter (torpedo), a device carried on the bows of some torpedoes to get through torpedo nets.
- Long-handled bolt cutters are sometimes used as net cutters by attack frogmen riding human torpedoes and similar to cut anti-submarine netting.
