= Shark-class submarine =

Shark-class submarine may refer to:

- British S-class submarine (1931)
  - HMS Shark (54S)
- Spanish Shark-class submarine
- Sang-O-class submarine ('Shark' class), of the navy of North Korea
- Typhoon-class submarine, Soviet Project 941 Akula (Russian: Акула, lit. 'shark')
- Akula-class submarine, Soviet Project 971 Shchuka-B

== See also ==
- USS Shark
