= List of submarines of the Spanish Navy =

Emblem of the Spanish Navy Submarine Units

The list of submarines in the Spanish Navy, commissioned or otherwise operated by the Spanish Navy.

== Peral "submarine torpedo boat" (Spain) ==
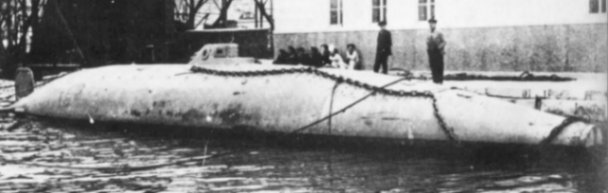
Peral's Submarine Torpedo boat in 1888

- Peral 1888 – 1890. Preserved as museum ship at Cartagena.

== Isaac Peral-class submarine (United States) ==
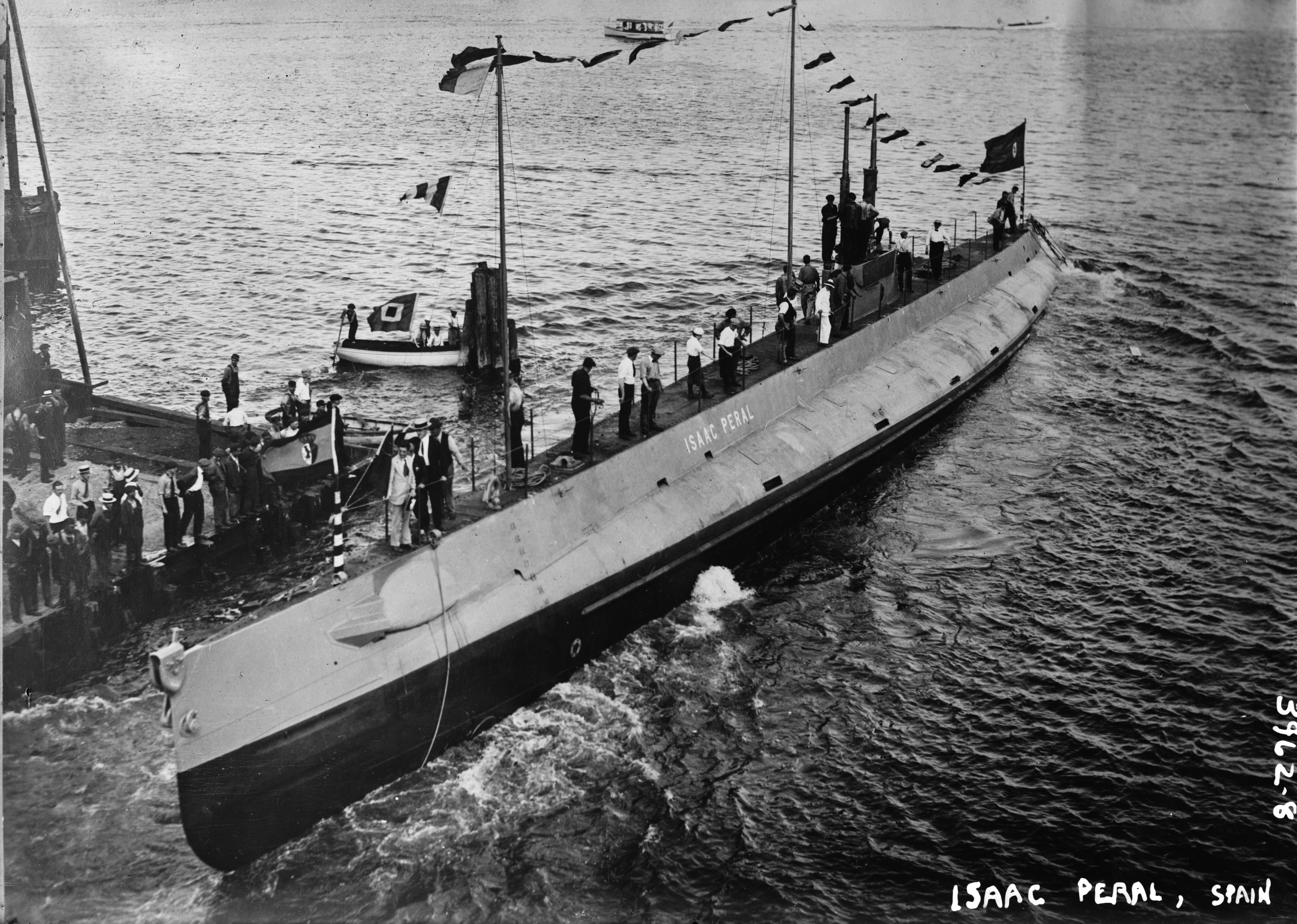
Isaac Peral launching on July 22, 1916 in Quincy, Massachusetts.

- Isaac Peral (A-0) 1917 – 1932.

== A class (Italy) ==
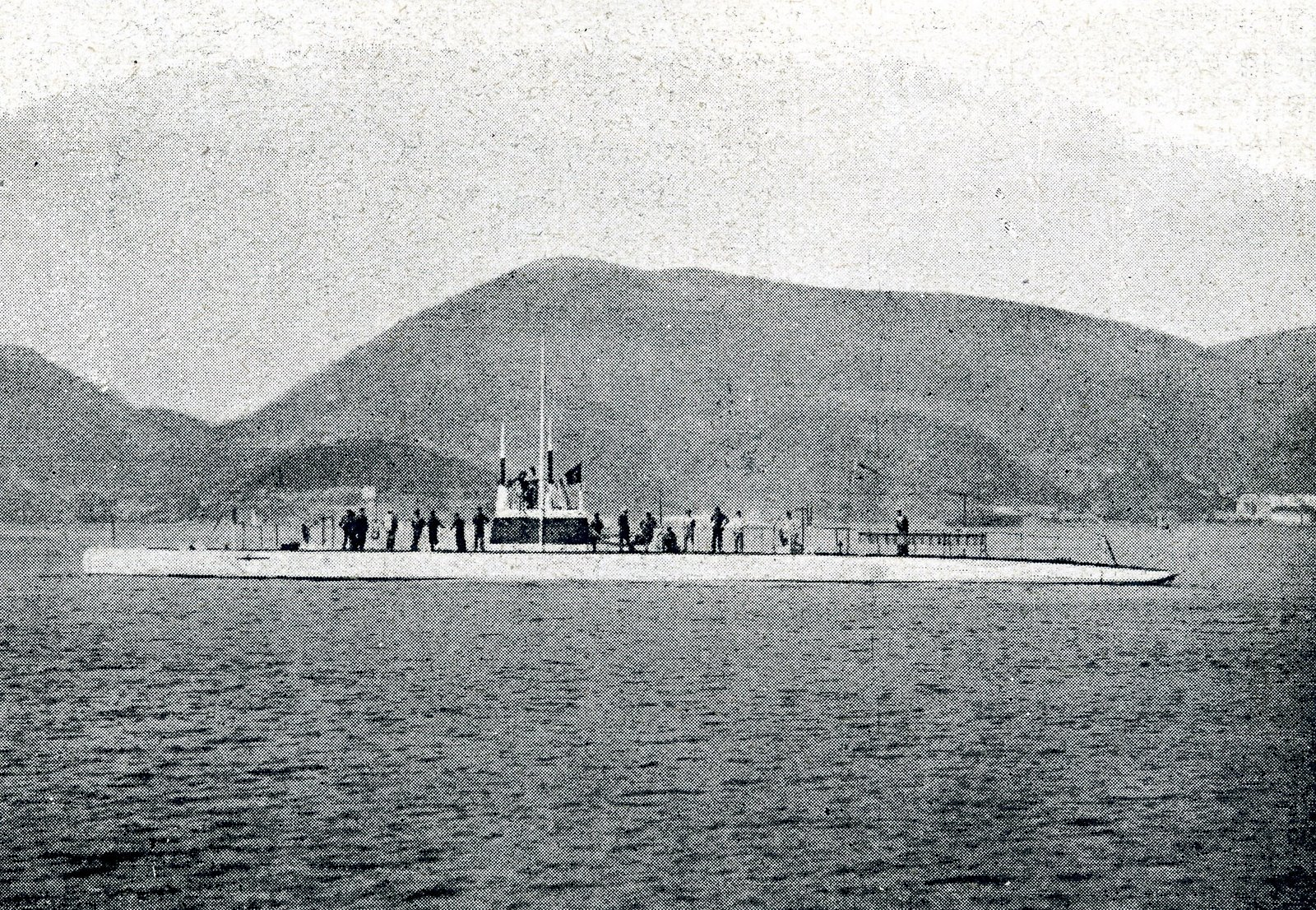
Submarine Cosme García (A-2)

- Narciso Monturiol (A-1) 1917 – 1934 (named for Narcís Monturiol i Estarriol).
- Cosme Garcia (A-2) 1917 – 1931 (named for Cosme García Sáez).
- A-3 1917 – 1932.

== B class (Spain) ==
- B-1 1922 – 1940. Sunk in Bay of Alcudia, Mallorca
- B-2 1922 – 1952.
- B-3 1922 – 1940.
- B-4 1923 – 1941.
- B-5 1925 – 1936, sunk near Estepona.
- B-6 1926 – 1936, sunk by Nationalist destroyer Velasco during Spanish Civil War.

== C class (Spain) ==
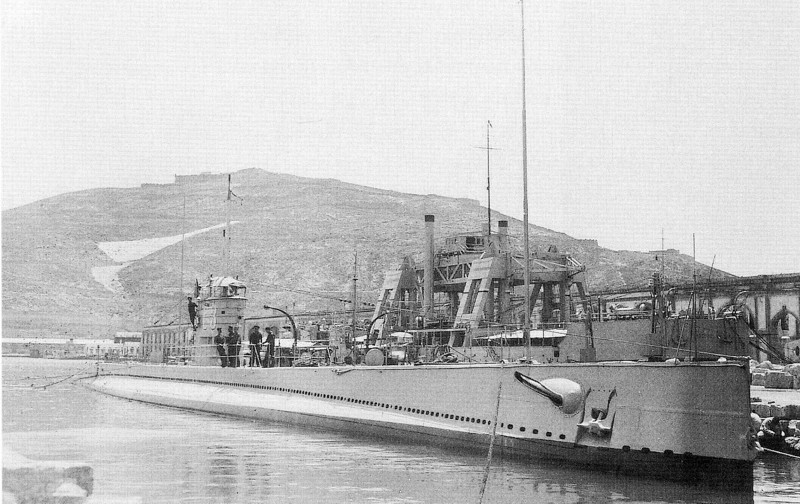
Submarine C-3 with submarine rescue ship Kanguro

- Isaac Peral (C-1) 1928 – 1950.
- C-2 1928 – 1951.
- C-3 1928 – 1936, sunk by German submarine U-34.
- C-4 1928 – 1946, accidentally rammed by Spanish destroyer Lepanto.
- C-5 1928 – 1937, missing.
- C-6 1928 – 1937, scuttled.

== D class (Spain) (Spain) ==
- D-1 renamed S-11. 1947 – 1965.
- D-2 refitted and renamed S-21. 1951 – 1971.
- D-3 refitted and renamed S-22. 1954 – 1971.

== General Mola class (Italy) ==
- General Mola ex- Italian Torricelli. 1937 – 1958.
- General Sanjurjo ex-Italian Archimede. 1937 – 1958.

== G class (Spain) (Germany) ==
- 6 ships (G-1 to G-6) German Type VIIC built in Spain under license; cancelled, only one keel laid.
- G-7; renamed S-01 ex-U-573 (Germany) 1942 – 1970.

== Foca class (Spain) ==
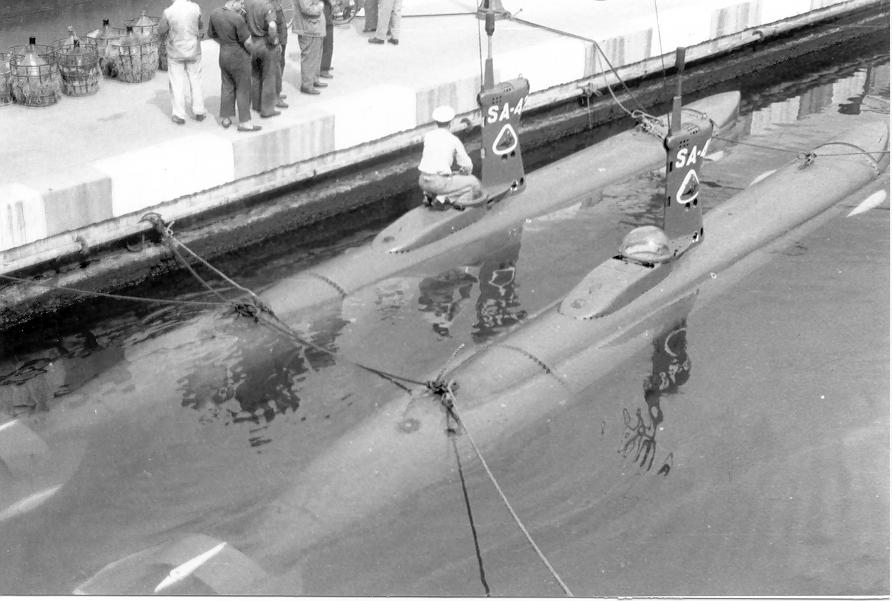
Foca-class midget submarines

- SA-41 1963 – 1967. Preserved as museum ship at Mahon.
- SA-42 1963 – 1967. Preserved as museum ship at Cartagena.

== Tiburón class (Spain) ==
- SA-51 1966. Preserved as museum ship at Barcelona.
- SA-52 1966. Preserved as museum ship at Cartagena.

== Balao class (United States) ==
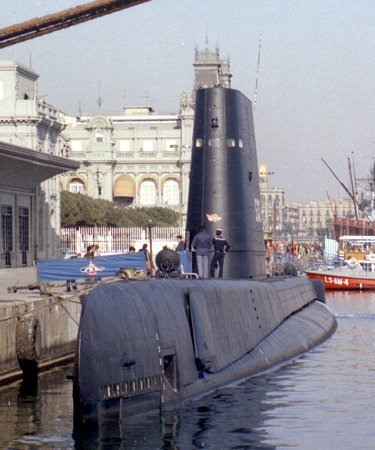
Isaac Peral (S-32)

- Almirante García de los Reyes (S-31) ex-USS Kraken (SS-370) 1959 – 1982.
- Isaac Peral (S-32) ex-USS Ronquil (SS-396) (Guppy IIA) 1971 – 1987.
- Narciso Monturiol (S-33) ex-USS Picuda (SS-382) (Guppy IIA) 1972 – 1977.
- Cosme García (S-34) ex-USS Bang (SS-385) (Guppy IIA) 1972 – 1983.
- Narciso Monturiol (S-35) ex-USS Jallao (SS-368) (Guppy IIA) 1974 – 1984.

== Delfín class (Spain) (France) ==
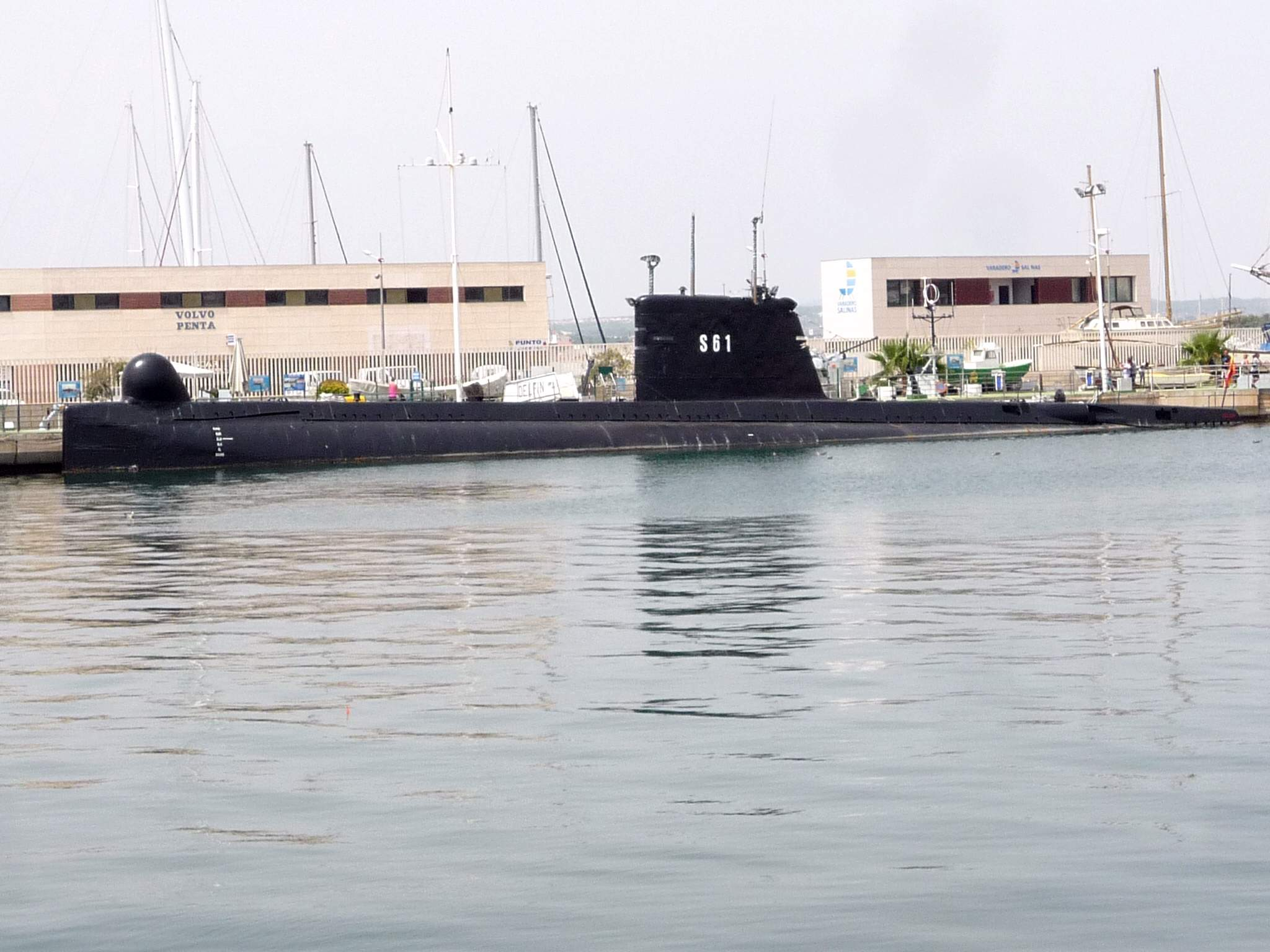
Delfín (S-61), preserved as museum ship at Torrevieja

French Daphné class submarine built in Spain under license

- Delfín (S-61) 1973 – 2003. Preserved as museum ship at Torrevieja
- Tonina (S-62) 1973 – 2005. Awaiting destination, possible museum ship
- Marsopa (S-63) 1975 – 2006.
- Narval (S-64) 1975 – 2003.

== Galerna class (Spain) (France) ==
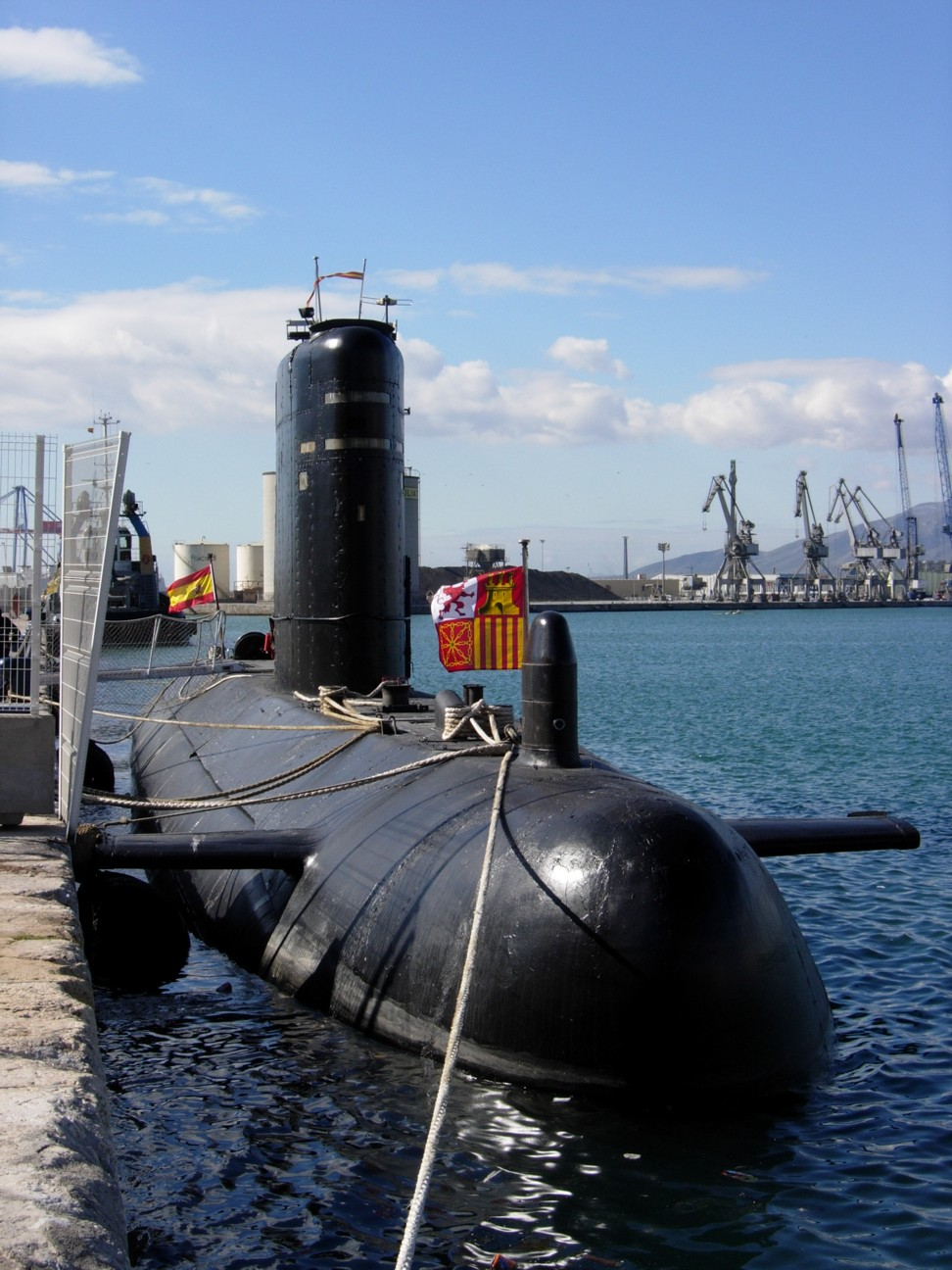
Tramontana (S-74)

French Agosta class submarine built in Spain under license

- Galerna (S-71) 1983 – Active.
- Siroco (S-72) 1983 – 2012.
- Mistral (S-73) 1985 – 2020
- Tramontana (S-74) 1986 – 2024.

== S-80 class (Spain) ==
- Isaac Peral (S-81) Finished.
- Narciso Monturiol (S-82) Under construction.
- Cosme García (S-83) Under construction.
- Mateo García de los Reyes (S-84) Under construction.

== See also ==
- List of active Spanish Navy ships
- List of future Spanish Navy ships
- List of historic Spanish Navy ships
- Ictíneo I
- Ictíneo II
- Submarino E-1
