= S61 =

S61 may refer to:

== Naval vessels ==
- HMAS Orion (S 61), of the Royal Australian Navy
- INS Sindhukirti (S61), of the Indian Navy
- Spanish submarine Delfín (S61)

== Rail and transit ==
- S61 (Long Island bus)
- S61 (New York City bus) serving Staten Island
- S61, a line of the Styria S-Bahn

== Other uses ==
- Blériot-SPAD S.61, a French fighter aircraft
- Chopi language
- County Route S61 (Bergen County, New Jersey)
- Expressway S61 (Poland)
- S61: Avoid release to the environment. Refer to special instructions/safety data sheet, a safety phrase
- Sikorsky S-61, an American helicopter
- S61, a postcode district in Rotherham, England
