= German submarine U-573 =

German World War II submarine

Coordinates: 37°00′N 1°00′W

History

Nazi Germany
- Name: U-573
- Ordered: 24 October 1939
- Builder: Blohm & Voss of Hamburg
- Yard number: 549
- Laid down: 8 June 1940
- Launched: 17 April 1941
- Commissioned: 5 June 1941
- Fate: Damaged by depth charges north-west of Algiers. Interned at Cartagena, Spain on 2 May 1942. Sold to Spain on 2 August 1942. Became the Spanish submarine G-7.

Spain
- Name: G-7
- Acquired: 1942
- Commissioned: 2 August 1942
- Renamed: S-01 (1961)
- Stricken: 2 May 1970
- Fate: Broken up

General characteristics
- Class & type: Type VIIC submarine
- Displacement: 769 tonnes (757 long tons) surfaced; 871 t (857 long tons) submerged
- Length: 67.10 m (220 ft 2 in) o/a; 50.50 m (165 ft 8 in) pressure hull
- Beam: 6.20 m (20 ft 4 in) o/a; 4.70 m (15 ft 5 in) pressure hull
- Height: 9.60 m (31 ft 6 in)
- Draught: 4.74 m (15 ft 7 in)
- Installed power: 2,800–3,200 PS (2,100–2,400 kW; 2,800–3,200 bhp) (diesels); 750 PS (550 kW; 740 shp) (electric)
- Propulsion: 2 shafts; 2 × diesel engines; 2 × electric motors
- Speed: 17.7 knots (32.8 km/h; 20.4 mph) surfaced; 7.6 knots (14.1 km/h; 8.7 mph) submerged
- Range: 8,500 nmi (15,700 km; 9,800 mi) at 10 knots (19 km/h; 12 mph) surfaced; 80 nmi (150 km; 92 mi) at 4 knots (7.4 km/h; 4.6 mph) submerged
- Test depth: 230 m (750 ft); Crush depth: 250–295 m (820–968 ft)
- Complement: 4 officers, 40–56 enlisted
- Armament: 5 × 53.3 cm (21 in) torpedo tubes (four bow, one stern); 14 × torpedoes or 26 TMA mines; 1 × 8.8 cm (3.46 in) deck gun (220 rounds); 1 x 2 cm (0.79 in) C/30 AA gun

Service record (Kriegsmarine)
- Part of: 3rd U-boat Flotilla; 5 June – 31 December 1941; 29th U-boat Flotilla; 1 January – 2 May 1942
- Identification codes: M 42 508
- Commanders: Kptlt. Heinrich Heinsohn; 5 June 1941 – 2 May 1942
- Operations: 4 patrols: 1st patrol: 27 September – 15 November 1941; 2nd patrol: a. 7 – 9 December 1941; b. 11 – 30 December 1941; 3rd patrol: 2 February – 6 March 1942; 4th patrol: 20 April – 2 May 1942
- Victories: 1 merchant ship sunk (5,289 GRT)

German submarine U-573 was a Type VIIC U-boat built for Nazi Germany's Kriegsmarine for service during World War II.

Her keel was laid down 8 June 1940 at the Blohm & Voss yard in Hamburg as yard number 549. She was launched on 17 April 1941 and commissioned on 5 June with Kapitänleutnant Heinrich Heinsohn (12 February 1910 – 6 May 1943) in command. Heinsohn commanded her for her entire career in the Kriegsmarine. In May 1941 he had arranged that the city of Landeck in Tyrol adopted the submarine within the then popular sponsorship programme (Patenschaftsprogramm), organising gifts and holidays for the crew, earning her the honorary name "U-573 Landeck".

The boat began her service career as part of the 3rd U-boat Flotilla when she conducted training; on 1 September 1941 she commenced operations with that flotilla. She was transferred to the 29th Flotilla, also for operations, on 1 January 1942. She was sold to the Spanish Navy that same year and became the Spanish submarine G-7.

== Design ==
German Type VIIC submarines were preceded by the shorter Type VIIB submarines. U-573 had a displacement of 769 tonnes (757 long tons) when at the surface and 871 tonnes (857 long tons) while submerged. She had a total length of 67.10 m (220 ft 2 in), a pressure hull length of 50.50 m (165 ft 8 in), a beam of 6.20 m (20 ft 4 in), a height of 9.60 m (31 ft 6 in), and a draught of 4.74 m (15 ft 7 in). The submarine was powered by two Germaniawerft F46 four-stroke, six-cylinder supercharged diesel engines producing a total of 2,800 to 3,200 metric horsepower (2,060 to 2,350 kW; 2,760 to 3,160 shp) for use while surfaced, two Brown, Boveri & Cie GG UB 720/8 double-acting electric motors producing a total of 750 metric horsepower (550 kW; 740 shp) for use while submerged. She had two shafts and two 1.23 m (4 ft) propellers. The boat was capable of operating at depths of up to 230 metres (750 ft).

The submarine had a maximum surface speed of 17.7 knots (32.8 km/h; 20.4 mph) and a maximum submerged speed of 7.6 knots (14.1 km/h; 8.7 mph). When submerged, the boat could operate for 80 nautical miles (150 km; 92 mi) at 4 knots (7.4 km/h; 4.6 mph); when surfaced, she could travel 8,500 nautical miles (15,700 km; 9,800 mi) at 10 knots (19 km/h; 12 mph). U-573 was fitted with five 53.3 cm (21 in) torpedo tubes (four fitted at the bow and one at the stern), fourteen torpedoes, one 8.8 cm (3.46 in) SK C/35 naval gun, 220 rounds, and a 2 cm (0.79 in) C/30 anti-aircraft gun. The boat had a complement of between forty-four and sixty.

== German service ==
U-573 conducted four war patrols, sinking just one ship.

=== First, second and third patrols ===
Her operational career began with her departure from Kiel on 15 September 1941. She entered the Atlantic via the North Sea and the gap between Iceland and the Faroe Islands. She almost reached the Labrador coast before heading for St. Nazaire in occupied France, docking on 15 November.

U-573's second patrol involved the boat slipping past the heavily defended Strait of Gibraltar into the Mediterranean, where she sank the Norwegian Hellen (5,289 GRT) with two torpedoes on 21 December 1941. She arrived at Pola in Croatia on 30 December.

Her third sortie was relatively uneventful, starting and finishing in Pola between 2 February and 6 March 1942.

=== Fourth patrol and internment ===
On 29 April 1942, U-573 was attacked with depth charges by Lockheed Hudsons of No. 233 Squadron RAF, northwest of Algiers. Seriously damaged, she limped north to Spain, arriving in Cartagena on 2 May. International agreements allowed ships in neutral ports 24 hours to make emergency repairs before they were to be interned. The Spanish authorities granted U-573 a three-month period for repairs, which prompted several strong protests from the British Embassy in Madrid. On 19 May Heinsohn flew from Madrid to Stuttgart, then travelled on to Berlin, in order to discuss the situation with the Kriegsmarine. He returned by train via Hendaye (in southwest France) on 28 May. Realizing that even three months would not be enough to repair the boat, the Kriegsmarine sold the vessel to Spain for 1.5 million ℛ︁ℳ︁. On 2 August 1942, at 10 am, (one day before the three-month period was due to expire), the Spanish navy commissioned the boat as the S01.

U-573's crew suffered no casualties during her career in the Kriegsmarine. The men had been interned in Cartagena and were gradually released in groups of two or three. The last five members of the crew left with Kapitänleutnant Heinsohn on 13 February 1943. He returned to the Kriegsmarinearsenal in Gotenhafen (Gdynia, Poland), then German-annexed Poland, In March he was ordered to Brest, then in German-occupied France to take command of U-438, and died with all his crew two months later.

== Spanish service ==
Work started on the U-573, now the G-7, in August 1943 following the sale to Spain but took four years to complete. The damage caused by the British attack was found to be more extensive than was first thought; also German technical assistance and parts were difficult to obtain in the last years of World War II and after. In addition, Spain's economy was weak following the Spanish Civil War. Repairs were completed in early 1947 and on 5 November 1947 G-7 was re-commissioned. The bow's net cutter and the 20mm anti aircraft cannon were removed.

Despite the Type VII being out-dated by the end of World War II, G-7 was the most modern of Spain's submarine fleet; her other vessels (two ex-Italian, and four home-built boats) dating from the early 1930s. G-7 lacked radar and did not possess a snorkel. In 1951 development was started on a snorkel design by Empresa Nacional Bazán, the Spanish shipbuilding company, but these came to nothing when the Spanish Navy bought the former US Navy submarine USS Kraken.

G-7's repairs were completed in 1947. In 1958 Arca-Filmproduktion GmbH rented G-7 to take part in the semi-fictitious movie U 47 – Kapitänleutnant Prien, partially based on his patrol to Scapa Flow, where he sank HMS Royal Oak.

In 1961 the Spanish Navy's submarine force was re-numbered, and G-7 became S-01.

One other U-boat was interned in Spain during World War II: U-760.

On 2 May 1970 she was de-commissioned after 23 years service. She was auctioned for 3,334,751 Pts (about US$26,500), after which, despite efforts to save and preserve her as a museum, the submarine was broken up for scrap.

== Summary of raiding history ==
Date	Ship Name	Nationality	Tonnage (GRT)	Fate
21 December 1941	Hellen	Norway	5,289	Sunk

== See also ==
- List of submarines of the Spanish Navy

== Bibliography ==
- Busch, Rainer; Röll, Hans-Joachim (1999). German U-boat commanders of World War II : a biographical dictionary. Translated by Brooks, Geoffrey. London, Annapolis, Md: Greenhill Books, Naval Institute Press. ISBN 1-55750-186-6.
- Busch, Rainer; Röll, Hans-Joachim (1999). Deutsche U-Boot-Verluste von September 1939 bis Mai 1945 [German U-boat losses from September 1939 to May 1945]. Der U-Boot-Krieg (in German). Vol. IV. Hamburg, Berlin, Bonn: Mittler. ISBN 3-8132-0514-2.
- Gröner, Erich; Jung, Dieter; Maass, Martin (1991). U-boats and Mine Warfare Vessels. German Warships 1815–1945. Vol. 2. Translated by Thomas, Keith; Magowan, Rachel. London: Conway Maritime Press. ISBN 0-85177-593-4.
- Kemp, Paul (1997). U-Boats Destroyed - German Submarine Losses in the World Wars. Arms & Armour. ISBN 1-85409-515-3.
