= Anti-submarine net =

Barrier for protection against submarines

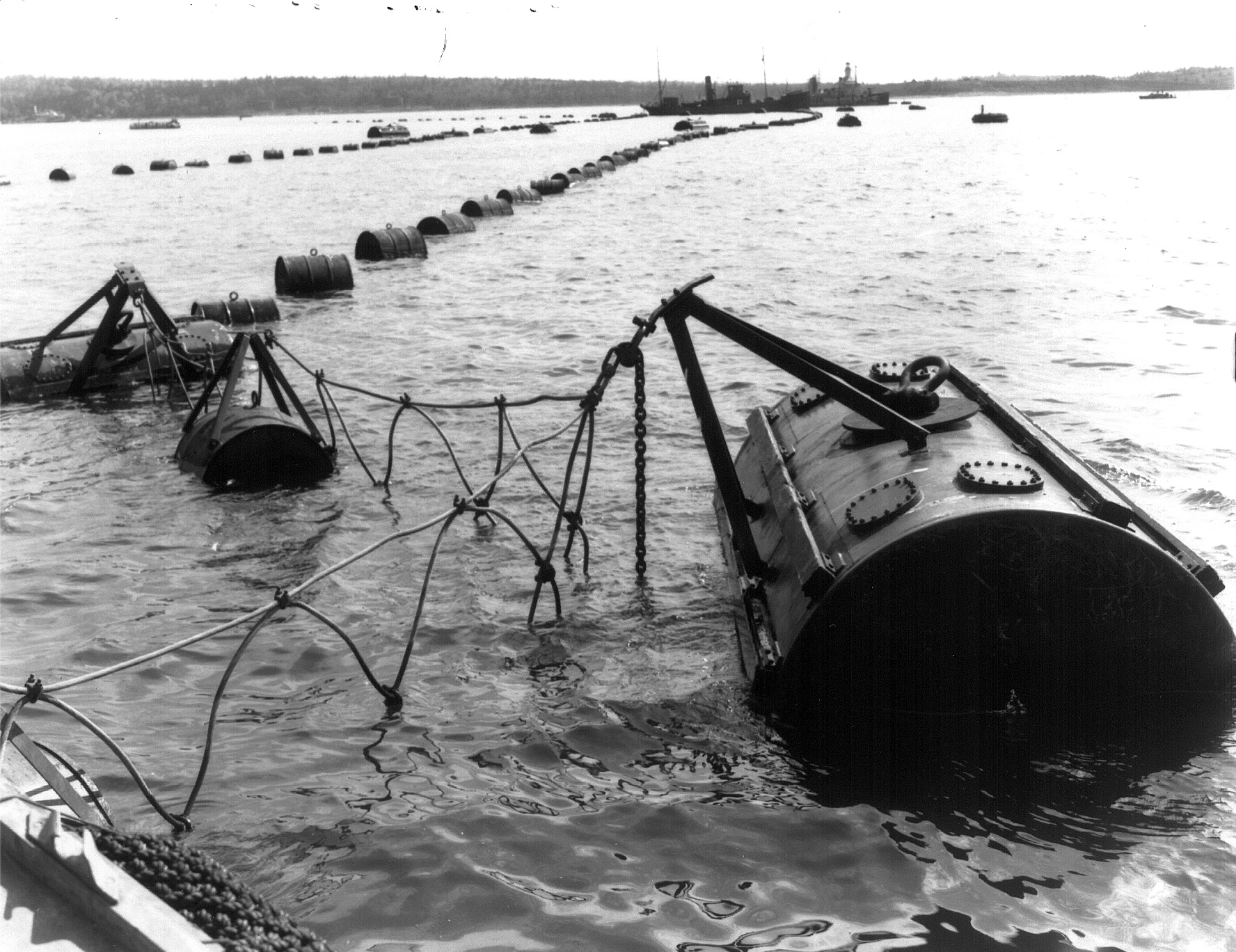
An anti-submarine net used during World War II in Nova Scotia, Canada

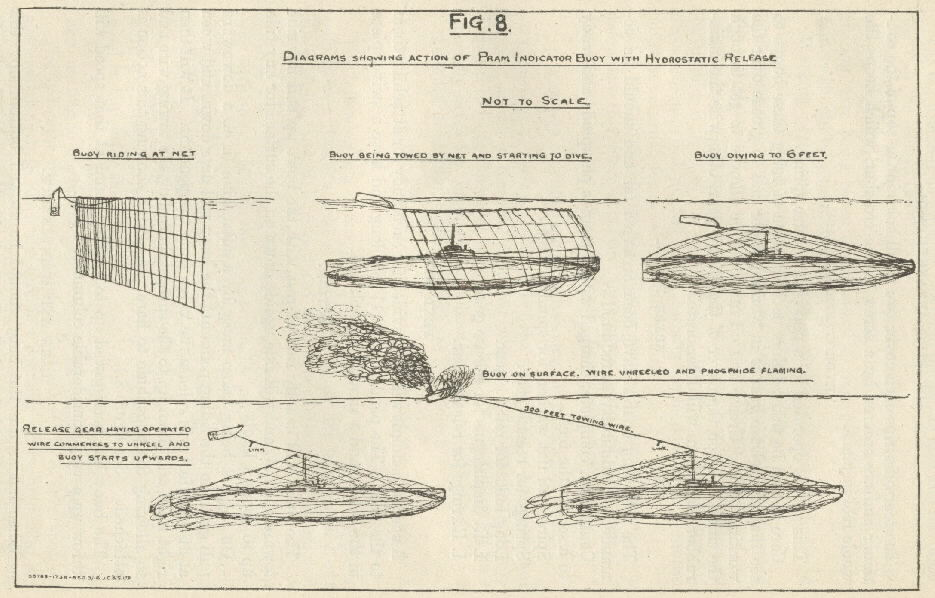
Anti-submarine defense net US Navy 1917

An anti-submarine net or anti-submarine boom is a boom placed across the mouth of a harbour or a strait for protection against submarines. Net laying ships would be used to place and remove the nets. The US Navy used anti-submarine nets in the Pacific War to protect major US Naval Advance Bases. Some net cutter submarines were used in the war.

== History ==
Submarine nets were first used shortly after the first use of submarines in warfare, during World War I. Because they were a reaction during the war, there was not time to study the best construction methods, or the nets' overall efficacy. But this was also a benefit, because the enemy did not know how effective submarine nets were either. Testing done after the war showed that the nets used during WWI had not been effective, and yet they had acted as an effective deterrent during the war since their weaknesses were not known.

A submarine net is very similar in principle to a boom. While a boom blocks a waterway for surface ships, a submarine net does the same below water. They suffer similar weaknesses. Small ships and submarines will tend to try to slip through gaps. Large vessels are capable of ramming through, even if they are hesitant to do so. The most effective way to prevent ramming is to yield slowly rather than be rigid. By gradually slowing a vessel to a stop the effectiveness of a barrier is greatly increased.

The most extensive use of anti-submarine nets during WWI was the Dover Barrage, spanning the English Channel. It was largely effective as a deterrent. There were limited examples of it succeeding and failing. One U-boat was caught in the net, but there were also reports of submarines bypassing the net, on the surface at night, or underwater by slipping through gaps. From war logs there was one example of U-32 getting tangled in the Dover nets. The boat lay on the bottom until night, then surfaced and freed herself and continued on.

This demonstrated that a net alone is not effective. It must be supported to be useful, generally by surface ships with depth charges.

Scapa Flow is a large natural harbor in Scotland. It was used in WWI and WWII by the Royal Navy, and secured with submarine nets. In 1918 SM UB-116 successfully bypassed the nets, though was subsequently sunk by a mine.

== Examples of anti-submarine nets ==
- Lake Macquarie anti-submarine boom
- Indicator net
- Naval operations in the Dardanelles Campaign
- Sydney Harbour anti-submarine boom net
- Isle of Bute during World War II - Anti-submarine net in the Clyde Estuary in Scotland (Item 4)

== See also ==
- Anti-submarine warfare
- Jumping wire (of a submarine)
- Net cutter (submarine)
- Net laying ship
- Torpedo net
