= USS Kraken =

Submarine of the United States

History

United States
- Name: USS Kraken (SS-370)
- Builder: Manitowoc Shipbuilding Company, Manitowoc, Wisconsin
- Laid down: 13 December 1943
- Launched: 30 April 1944
- Commissioned: 8 September 1944
- Decommissioned: 4 May 1948
- Recommissioned: 4 July 1959
- Decommissioned: 24 October 1959
- Stricken: 1 November 1974
- Fate: Transferred to Spain, 24 October 1959, sold to Spain, 1 November 1974

Spain
- Name: Almirante García de los Reyes (S-31)
- Namesake: Mateo García de los Reyes (1872–1936), Spanish admiral and minister of the navy
- Commissioned: 25 October 1959
- Decommissioned: 16 September 1974
- Recommissioned: 1 September 1975
- Decommissioned: April 1981
- Stricken: 1 April 1982
- Fate: Scrapped

General characteristics
- Class & type: Balao class diesel-electric submarine
- Displacement: 1,526 tons (1,550 t) surfaced; 2,424 tons (2,463 t) submerged
- Length: 311 ft 9 in (95.02 m)
- Beam: 27 ft 3 in (8.31 m)
- Draft: 16 ft 10 in (5.13 m) maximum
- Propulsion: 4 × General Motors Model 16-278A V16 diesel engines driving electrical generators; 2 × 126-cell Sargo batteries; 4 × high-speed General Electric electric motors with reduction gears; 2 × propellers; 5,400 shp (4.0 MW) surfaced; 2,740 shp (2.0 MW) submerged
- Speed: 20.25 knots (38 km/h) surfaced; 8.75 knots (16 km/h) submerged
- Range: 11,000 nautical miles (20,000 km) surfaced at 10 knots (19 km/h)
- Endurance: 48 hours at 2 knots (3.7 km/h) submerged; 75 days on patrol
- Test depth: 400 ft (120 m)
- Complement: 10 officers, 70–71 enlisted
- Armament: 10 × 21-inch (533 mm) torpedo tubes; 6 forward, 4 aft; 24 torpedoes; 1 × 5-inch (127 mm) / 25 caliber deck gun; Bofors 40 mm and Oerlikon 20 mm cannon

USS Kraken (SS-370), a Balao-class submarine, was a ship of the United States Navy named for the kraken, a legendary sea monster believed to haunt the coasts of Norway.

Kraken commissioned in September 1944 and saw action during the last year of World War II, serving in the Pacific Theater and making four war patrols. In 1946 she was placed in reserve.

In 1959 Kraken was transferred to the Spanish Navy as Almirante García de los Reyes. She was scrapped in 1982.

== USS Kraken (SS-370) ==
=== Service history ===
Kraken was launched 30 April 1944, by the Manitowoc Shipbuilding Co., Manitowoc, Wisc.; sponsored by Mrs. John Z. Anderson, wife of Congressman Anderson of California; and commissioned 8 September 1944.

Kraken steamed by way of Chicago to Lockport, Ill., 27 September 1944, and was carried in a floating drydock down the Mississippi River arriving at Algiers, La., 4 October. Ten days later Kraken cleared Algiers, transited the Panama Canal and underwent intensive training in the Gulf of Panama. She sailed for Hawaii 4 November and arrived Pearl Harbor 21 November.

Kraken departed Pearl Harbor 12 December 1944, for her first war patrol, touched at Saipan 23 December, set course for Indochina next morning. There she maintained lifeguard duty in support of 3rd Fleet carrier strikes. While on station she rescued a Lexington pilot from rough seas and evaded a strafing enemy plane by diving. Finding no targets, Kraken set course for Fremantle, Australia, arriving there 14 February 1945.

Kraken departed on her second war patrol 15 March and maintained lifeguard duty in the South China Sea supporting aircraft carrier strikes against Singapore and Saigon. She returned to Subic Bay, P.I., 26 April.

Departing on her third war patrol on 19 May 1945, Kraken set course for the Gulf of Siam. After searching in vain for enemy targets, she shifted to the Java Sea where on 19 June she bombarded Merak and riddled a coaster and a small ship with 5-inch (130 mm) and 40 mm projectiles. She saw the coaster sink and she left the small ship ablaze before clearing the harbor.

Three days later, while chasing an eight-ship convoy, Kraken's torpedoes sank an oiler and a coastal steamer and her guns inflicted heavy damage on one of the Japanese submarine chasers. Then Kraken proudly sailed into Fremantle, Australia, 3 July 1945, ending her most successful patrol.

Kraken sailed on her fourth and last patrol 29 July. While seeking the enemy in the Java Sea, her patrol was cut short when she received news of Japan's capitulation. Sailing for Subic Bay, she arrived 21 August.

Kraken cleared Subic Bay 31 August 1945, touched at Pearl Harbor, and arrived at San Francisco 22 September. On 14 October she rendezvoused with Admiral William Halsey's 3rd Fleet and formed a part of honor escort for Halsey, as he passed under the Golden Gate Bridge in his flagship, South Dakota (BB-57). Ten days later Kraken visited Longview, Wash., for the first postwar Navy Day celebrations and returned to San Francisco 31 October where she was placed out of commission 4 May 1946 in the Pacific Reserve Fleet.

=== Honors and awards ===
- Asiatic–Pacific Campaign Medal with one battle star
- World War II Victory Medal
- Philippine Liberation Medal

== Almirante García de los Reyes (S-31) ==
Kraken remained in reserve status until 18 September 1958, when she was assigned to Pearl Harbor Naval Shipyard for activation overhaul and given a Fleet Snorkel conversion preparatory to transfer on loan to Spain. After several months of familiarization at Pearl Harbor for her new crew, on 25 October 1959 she was commissioned as Almirante García de los Reyes, in memory of Contralmirante (Counter Admiral) Mateo García de los Reyes (1872–1936), the organizer and first chief of the Spanish Navy's submarine force and later a minister of the navy. The ship's unusually long name posed a practical problem, so the abbreviation "A. G. de los Reyes" was often used. Originally designated E-1, she was redesignated S-31 in 1961 to conform to the new, NATO-style numbering system adopted by the Spanish Navy. Almirante García de los Reyes was the only modern Spanish submarine in the 1960s (Spain, also had one German Type VIIC, Ex U-573, and three "insecure" and old Spanish D-class submarines), and was nicknamed "treinta y único" ("thirty only-one") and became almost legendary.

Almirante García de los Reyes's voyage via the Panama Canal to Cartagena, Spain, took till late January 1960.

Almirante García de los Reyes was decommissioned on 16 September 1974, sold to Spain, and struck from the U.S. Naval Register on 1 November 1974. She was to have been cannibalized, but had to be overhauled and recommissioned on 1 September 1975 to replace the submarine Narcíso Monturiol (S33), which had suffered a severe engine failure the previous spring and had to be stricken. Almirante García de los Reyes was finally decommissioned in April 1981, struck from the Spanish Navy list on 1 April 1982, and scrapped.

== See also ==
- List of submarines of the Spanish Navy
