= Antone R. Gallaher =

U.S. Navy officer (1909–1982)

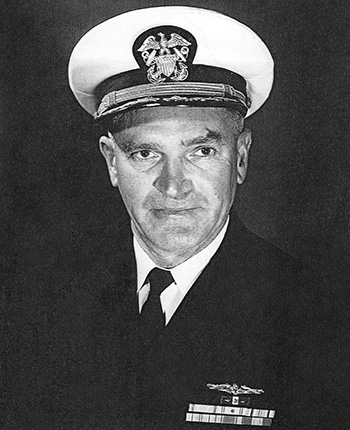
- Nickname: Tony
- Born: 19 August 1909; Augusta, Georgia, U.S.
- Died: 14 October 1982 (aged 73) San Diego County, California, U.S.
- Allegiance: United States of America
- Branch: United States Navy
- Service years: 1928–1929; 1933–1963
- Rank: Captain
- Commands: Submarine Flotilla 1; USS Prairie; Submarine Development Group 2; Submarine Division 11; USS Bang; USS R-13
- Conflicts: World War II
- Awards: Navy Cross (4)

Antone Renkl Gallaher (19 August 1909 – 14 October 1982) was a United States Navy captain. A decorated veteran of World War II, he earned the Navy Cross four times as commander of the submarine USS Bang in the Pacific theater.

== Early life and education ==
Gallaher was born and raised in Augusta, Georgia. He enlisted in the Navy on 6 June 1928. After serving aboard the light cruiser USS Cincinnati, Gallaher was sent to the United States Naval Academy Preparatory School in Norfolk, Virginia in October 1928. Appointed to the Naval Academy, he was discharged from active duty on 4 July 1929. Gallaher graduated from the Naval Academy with a B.S. degree in June 1933.

Commissioned as an ensign, Gallaher served aboard the cruiser USS Indianapolis until December 1935. Promoted to lieutenant (junior grade), he attended the Submarine School in New London, Connecticut from January to May 1936. Gallaher later completed a course in strategy and tactics at the Naval War College in June 1953.

== Career ==
From June to December 1936, Gallaher served aboard the submarine USS R-11. He was then reassigned to USS S-37 in the Pacific from February 1937 to May 1939. From July 1939 to February 1942, Gallaher served aboard USS R-4 based at Naval Base Cavite in the Philippines.

From February 1942 to April 1943, Gallaher served as the commanding officer of USS R-13 based at Key West, Florida training submarine crew members. In July 1943, he was sent to the Portsmouth Navy Yard in Kittery, Maine to supervise the final preparation of USS Bang for her commissioning. Gallaher then served as her commanding officer from December 1943 to March 1945. He commanded her first five war patrols, subsequently receiving the Navy Cross for each of the first four.

From April 1949 to May 1950, Gallaher served as commander of Submarine Division 11 with his pennant on USS Tilefish. From June 1950 to July 1952, he returned to the Naval Academy to teach marine engineering, seamanship and navigation. Gallaher was promoted to captain in January 1952. From July 1953 to August 1955, he served as the commanding officer of Submarine Development Group 2, Atlantic with his pennant on USS K-1.

From 1955 to 1956, Gallaher served as department head and professor of mathematics at the Naval Academy. He remained at the Naval Academy until 1958, serving first as secretary of the Academic Board and then as an aide to the superintendent. From September 1958 to October 1959, Gallaher was commanding officer of the destroyer tender USS Prairie. He was then given command of Submarine Flotilla 1 until November 1960.

From December 1960 to August 1962, Gallaher served in staff positions at the Pentagon. In September 1962, he became director of Navy recruiting for the 8th Navy Recruiting Area based in San Francisco, California. Gallaher retired from active duty on 1 July 1963.

== Personal ==
Gallaher was the son of Edward Joseph Gallaher and Erma (Renkl) Gallaher. He had two sisters and two brothers.

Gallaher married Mary Catherine MacKay (31 October 1913 – 8 August 1994). They had six daughters and a son.

After retirement, Gallaher lived in San Diego County, California. He died at a hospital there on 14 October 1982. Gallaher was cremated and his ashes were scattered at sea.
