= Spanish submarine Cosme García =

Cosme García has been the name of three Spanish Navy submarines named for the Spanish submarine pioneer Cosme García Sáez:

- Cosme García (A-2), an A-class submarine commissioned in 1917 and stricken in 1934.
- Cosme García (S-34), a Balao-class submarine in commission from 1972 to 1980 which previously served in the United States Navy as USS Bang (SS-385).
- Cosme García (S-84), an S-80 Plus-class submarine launched in 2025 and scheduled for completion in 2028.
