= USS Ronquil =

Submarine of the United States

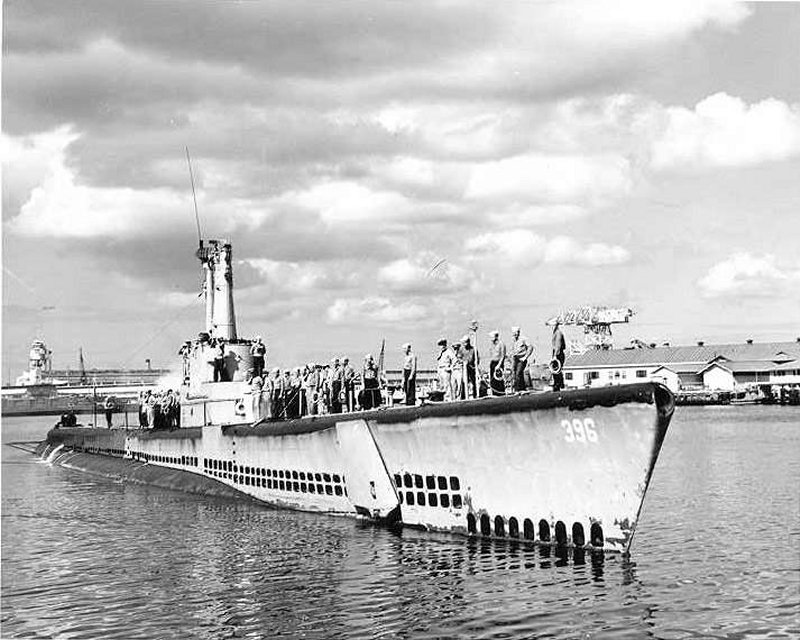
- USS Ronquil (SS-396) entering Pearl Harbor, c. 1944-45.

History

United States
- Name: USS Ronquil (SS-396)
- Namesake: Ronquil
- Builder: Portsmouth Naval Shipyard, Kittery, Maine
- Laid down: 9 September 1943
- Launched: 27 January 1944
- Sponsored by: Mrs. C. M. Elder
- Commissioned: 22 April 1944
- Decommissioned: May 1952
- Recommissioned: 16 January 1953
- Decommissioned: 1 July 1971
- Stricken: 1 July 1971
- Fate: Transferred to Spain, 1 July 1971

Spain
- Name: Isaac Peral (S-32)
- Namesake: Isaac Peral (1851–1895), Spanish naval officer
- Acquired: 1 July 1971
- Decommissioned: 3 April 1984
- Honors and awards: Six battle stars

General characteristics
- Class & type: Balao-class diesel-electric submarine
- Displacement: 1,526 tons (1,550 t) surfaced; 2,391 tons (2,429 t) submerged
- Length: 311 ft 6 in (94.95 m)
- Beam: 27 ft 3 in (8.31 m)
- Draft: 16 ft 10 in (5.13 m) maximum
- Propulsion: 4 × Fairbanks-Morse Model 38D8-⅛ 10-cylinder opposed piston diesel engines driving electrical generators; 2 × 126-cell Sargo batteries; 4 × high-speed Elliott electric motors with reduction gears; two propellers; 5,400 shp (4.0 MW) surfaced; 2,740 shp (2.0 MW) submerged
- Speed: 20.25 knots (38 km/h) surfaced; 8.75 knots (16 km/h) submerged
- Range: 11,000 nautical miles (20,000 km) surfaced at 10 knots (19 km/h)
- Endurance: 48 hours at 2 knots (3.7 km/h) submerged; 75 days on patrol
- Test depth: 400 ft (120 m)
- Complement: 10 officers, 70–71 enlisted
- Armament: 10 × 21-inch (533 mm) torpedo tubes; 6 forward, 4 aft; 24 torpedoes; 1 × 5-inch (127 mm) / 25 caliber deck gun; Bofors 40 mm and Oerlikon 20 mm cannon

General characteristics (Guppy IIA)
- Class & type: none
- Displacement: 1,848 tons (1,878 t) surfaced; 2,440 tons (2,479 t) submerged
- Length: 307 ft (93.6 m)
- Beam: 27 ft 4 in (8.3 m)
- Draft: 17 ft (5.2 m)
- Propulsion: Snorkel added; One diesel engine and generator removed; Batteries upgraded to Sargo II
- Speed: Surfaced: 17.0 knots (19.6 mph; 31.5 km/h) maximum; 13.5 knots (15.5 mph; 25.0 km/h) cruising; Submerged: 14.1 knots (16.2 mph; 26.1 km/h) for ½ hour; 8.0 knots (9.2 mph; 14.8 km/h) snorkeling; 3.0 knots (3.5 mph; 5.6 km/h) cruising
- Armament: 10 × 21 inch (533 mm) torpedo tubes; (six forward, four aft); all guns removed

USS Ronquil (SS-396), a Balao-class submarine, was the only ship of the United States Navy named after the ronquil, a spiny-finned fish found along the northwest coast of North America. It has a single dorsal fin and a large mouth and resembles the tropical jawfish.

== Construction and commissioning ==
Ronquil was laid down on 9 September 1943 at the Portsmouth Navy Yard, in Kittery, Maine; launched on 27 January 1944, sponsored by Mrs. C. M. Elder; and commissioned on 22 April 1944.

== Service history ==
=== U.S. Navy service ===
==== World War II ====
After shakedown off the New England coast, Ronquil sailed for Hawaii. She arrived at Pearl Harbor on 8 July 1944; and, after preparatory training, sailed on her first war patrol (31 July – 8 September 1944) in the northeastern Formosa-Sakishima Gunto area. On 24 August the submarine sank two attack cargo ships: Yoshida Maru No. 3 (4,646 tons) and Fukurei Maru (5,969 tons). Ronquil’s second war patrol, from 30 September to 28 November 1944, was carried out in two phases. She first operated with a coordinated submarine attack group in the Bungo Suido area, and then joined six other submarines to carry out an antipatrol ship sweep off the Bonin Islands.

On her third war patrol, from 1 January to 14 February 1945, Ronquil patrolled the Bonins and did lifeguard duty in that area for Army bombers hitting the Japanese home islands. Her fourth war patrol from 11 March to 23 April 1945, brought her no worthwhile enemy targets but resulted in the rescue of 10 Army aviators from a B-29 bomber downed between the Bonins and Japan. The submarine's fifth and last patrol from 19 May to 26 July 1945, took her into the East China Sea and the Yellow Sea.

The end of the war in the Pacific in mid-August 1945 found Ronquil off Pearl Harbor, training for another war patrol.

==== Post-World War II service ====
===== 1945–1952 =====
Ronquil returned to San Diego in the fall of 1945 and engaged in training exercises off the California coast. In January 1947, she departed San Diego for her first peacetime western Pacific deployment. This patrol lasted 114 days and took the submarine to Tahiti, the Caroline Islands, the Mariana Islands, Japan, and the Yellow Sea. On her return to San Diego, she resumed local operations before beginning a three-year period of intensive training in offensive and antisubmarine warfare, embodying lessons learned during World War II as well as new postwar developments.

===== 1953–1971 =====
Ronquil entered Mare Island Naval Shipyard in May 1952 for decommissioning and "Guppy IIA" modernization: Her hull and sail were streamlined for greater submerged speed. She received new, increased-capacity batteries for underwater endurance, and a snorkel which enabled her to use her diesels at periscope depth. New electronics, including improved sonar and fire-control systems, were installed.

Ronquil was recommissioned on 16 January 1953, and on 12 June departed for Japan. She arrived at Yokosuka before sailing on to Tokyo on 19 July to take part in the "Black Ship Festival" commemorating Commodore Matthew Perry's opening of Japan in 1852. Throughout August and September, Ronquil participated in antisubmarine and other operations in the waters near Japan; this was to set the pattern for most of her later deployments.

On 11 December 1953 Ronquil returned to San Diego for a year of overhaul, refresher training, Naval Reserve training, and fleet exercises. She sailed for a second western Pacific tour on 21 March 1955, returning late in September. The next 2 years were devoted to operations off the west coast of the United States; on 31 July 1957, the submarine again deployed to the Far East for 7 months.

From 3 July to 7 July 1958, Ronquil took part, with other ships of the fleet, in an observance of the 50th anniversary of the arrival of the "Great White Fleet" at San Francisco. She resumed normal operations, then sailed from San Diego on 6 April 1959 for a 5-month "WestPac" deployment. During July and August 1960, she participated in extensive antisubmarine exercises in the eastern Pacific with United States and Canadian forces.

In the early fall of 1961 Ronquil again sailed for the Far East, returning in March 1962. After taking part in a demonstration of antisubmarine operations for the national radio and television networks, she began a period of overhaul and local operations. The submarine departed San Diego in November 1963 for duty with the United States Seventh Fleet; on her return to California, she again resumed operations off the west coast. Late in 1964 Ronquil began preparations for deployment to the Vietnam area. In February 1965 she sailed for Southeast Asia and a five-month deployment.

In mid-1966, Ronquil rejoined the Seventh Fleet, returning to San Diego in February 1967 for further work off the coast of California. This was interrupted in August 1967, when Ronquil played the part of the fictional USS Tigerfish (SSN-509) in the motion picture Ice Station Zebra.

On 26 December 1967, Ronquil was again underway for Japan. During this deployment, she took part in exercises with U.S., Royal Navy, Canadian Forces, Japan Maritime Self-Defense Force, and Royal Australian Navy forces. On 2 July 1968 Ronquil returned to the United States West Coast. Ronquil departed for the East Asia on 4 July 1969, returning to San Diego on 24 December 1969.

At the end of January 1970 Ronquil began a period of repair and overhaul, followed by training and fleet exercises in the eastern Pacific. August 1970 brought another Seventh Fleet deployment. She returning to San Diego on 5 March 1971. The Vietnam Service Medal was awarded for this deployment.

On 1 July 1971, Ronquil was decommissioned, struck from the Naval Register,

==== Honors and awards ====
Ronquil earned six battle stars for World War II service.

- Asiatic–Pacific Campaign Medal with six battle stars
- World War II Victory Medal
- Vietnam Service Medal

=== Spanish service ===
On the day of her commissioning, Ronquil was transferred to Spain under the Mutual Security Assistance Act. She was commissioned into the Spanish Navy as Isaac Peral (S-32), named after Spanish submarine pioneer Isaac Peral. Under her new commander, Lieutenant Commander Pedro Soler Yolif, she sailed from San Diego to her new home port of Cartagena, Spain, where she arrived on 22 August 1971.

Isaac Peral faced retirement in 1982, but her service was extended until the commissioning of the new submarine Siroco. The Spanish Navy finally decommissioned Isaac Peral on 3 April 1984.

== See also ==
- List of submarines of the Spanish Navy
