= German submarine U-760 =

German World War II submarine

History

Nazi Germany
- Name: U-760
- Ordered: 9 October 1939
- Builder: Kriegsmarinewerft Wilhelmshaven
- Yard number: 143
- Laid down: 5 August 1940
- Launched: 21 June 1942
- Commissioned: 15 October 1942
- Fate: Interned on 8 September 1943; Scuttled during Operation Deadlight on 13 December 1945

General characteristics
- Class & type: Type VIIC submarine
- Displacement: 769 tonnes (757 long tons) surfaced; 871 t (857 long tons) submerged
- Length: 67.10 m (220 ft 2 in) o/a; 50.50 m (165 ft 8 in) pressure hull
- Beam: 6.20 m (20 ft 4 in) o/a; 4.70 m (15 ft 5 in) pressure hull
- Height: 9.60 m (31 ft 6 in)
- Draught: 4.74 m (15 ft 7 in)
- Installed power: 2,800–3,200 PS (2,100–2,400 kW; 2,800–3,200 bhp) (diesels); 750 PS (550 kW; 740 shp) (electric)
- Propulsion: 2 shafts; 2 × diesel engines; 2 × electric motors
- Speed: 17.7 knots (32.8 km/h; 20.4 mph) surfaced; 7.6 knots (14.1 km/h; 8.7 mph) submerged
- Range: 8,500 nmi (15,700 km; 9,800 mi) at 10 knots (19 km/h; 12 mph) surfaced; 80 nmi (150 km; 92 mi) at 4 knots (7.4 km/h; 4.6 mph) submerged
- Test depth: 230 m (750 ft); Crush depth: 250–295 m (820–968 ft)
- Complement: 4 officers, 40–56 enlisted
- Armament: 5 × 53.3 cm (21 in) torpedo tubes (four bow, one stern); 14 × torpedoes; 1 × 8.8 cm (3.46 in) deck gun (220 rounds); 2 × twin 2 cm (0.79 in) C/30 anti-aircraft guns

Service record
- Part of: 8th U-boat Flotilla; 15 October 1942 – 30 April 1943; 3rd U-boat Flotilla; 1 May – 8 September 1943
- Identification codes: M 49 952
- Commanders: Oblt.z.S. / Kptlt. Otto-Ulrich Blum; 15 October 1942 – 8 September 1943
- Operations: 2 patrols: 1st patrol: 29 April – 31 May 1943; 2nd patrol: 24 July – 8 September 1943
- Victories: None

German submarine U-760 was a Type VIIC U-boat of Nazi Germany's Kriegsmarine during World War II.

Her keel was laid down 5 August 1940 by the Kriegsmarinewerft of Wilhelmshaven, and she was commissioned 15 October 1942 with Oberleutnant zur See Otto-Ulrich Blum in command. Blum commanded her for her entire career in the Kriegsmarine.

== Design ==
German Type VIIC submarines were preceded by the shorter Type VIIB submarines. U-760 had a displacement of 769 tonnes (757 long tons) when at the surface and 871 tonnes (857 long tons) while submerged. She had a total length of 67.10 m (220 ft 2 in), a pressure hull length of 50.50 m (165 ft 8 in), a beam of 6.20 m (20 ft 4 in), a height of 9.60 m (31 ft 6 in), and a draught of 4.74 m (15 ft 7 in). The submarine was powered by two Germaniawerft F46 four-stroke, six-cylinder supercharged diesel engines producing a total of 2,800 to 3,200 metric horsepower (2,060 to 2,350 kW; 2,760 to 3,160 shp) for use while surfaced, two Garbe, Lahmeyer & Co. RP 137/c double-acting electric motors producing a total of 750 metric horsepower (550 kW; 740 shp) for use while submerged. She had two shafts and two 1.23 m (4 ft) propellers. The boat was capable of operating at depths of up to 230 metres (750 ft).

The submarine had a maximum surface speed of 17.7 knots (32.8 km/h; 20.4 mph) and a maximum submerged speed of 7.6 knots (14.1 km/h; 8.7 mph). When submerged, the boat could operate for 80 nautical miles (150 km; 92 mi) at 4 knots (7.4 km/h; 4.6 mph); when surfaced, she could travel 8,500 nautical miles (15,700 km; 9,800 mi) at 10 knots (19 km/h; 12 mph). U-760 was fitted with five 53.3 cm (21 in) torpedo tubes (four fitted at the bow and one at the stern), fourteen torpedoes, one 8.8 cm (3.46 in) SK C/35 naval gun, 220 rounds, and two twin 2 cm (0.79 in) C/30 anti-aircraft guns. The boat had a complement of between forty-four and sixty.

== Service history ==
U-760 conducted two war patrols, but never sank or damaged a ship. On 26 February 1943 Obermaschinist Jakob Ippendorf died during an air attack in Wilhelmshaven. On 12 August 1943 Matrosenenobergefreiter Günter Werner was lost during an air attack in the North Atlantic.

On 8 September 1943, about 150 nautical miles (280 km) off Cape Finisterre, U-760 was sailing on the surface alongside U-262 when they were attacked by Allied aircraft. U-760 fled into Vigo harbour and was taken under the guns of the Spanish cruiser Navarra.

=== Fate ===
International neutrality agreements allowed ships to spend up to 24 hours in neutral harbours to make emergency repairs, but U-760 was unable to get underway in time. She was interned at Ferrol for the remainder of World War II. The submarine engine was dismantled and used to generate electric energy for the city of Vigo's tram network. On 23 July 1945, the boat was taken to the United Kingdom for Operation Deadlight and was scuttled on 13 December 1945.

One other U-boat was interned in Spain during World War II: U-573.

== Bibliography ==
- Busch, Rainer; Röll, Hans-Joachim (1999). German U-boat commanders of World War II : a biographical dictionary. Translated by Brooks, Geoffrey. London, Annapolis, Md: Greenhill Books, Naval Institute Press. ISBN 1-55750-186-6.
- Busch, Rainer; Röll, Hans-Joachim (1999). Der U-Boot-Krieg, 1939-1945: Deutsche U-Boot-Verluste von September 1939 bis Mai 1945 [German U-boat losses from September 1939 to May 1945] (in German). Vol. IV. Hamburg, Berlin, Bonn: Mittler. ISBN 3-8132-0514-2.
- Gröner, Eric; Jung, Dieter; Maass, Martin (1991). German Warships 1815-1945: U-boats and Mine Warfare Vessels. Vol. 2. Translated by Thomas, Keith; Magowan, Rachel. London: Conway Maritime Press. ISBN 0-85177-593-4.
