= Jumping wire =

Cable stretched between the bow and stern of a submarine

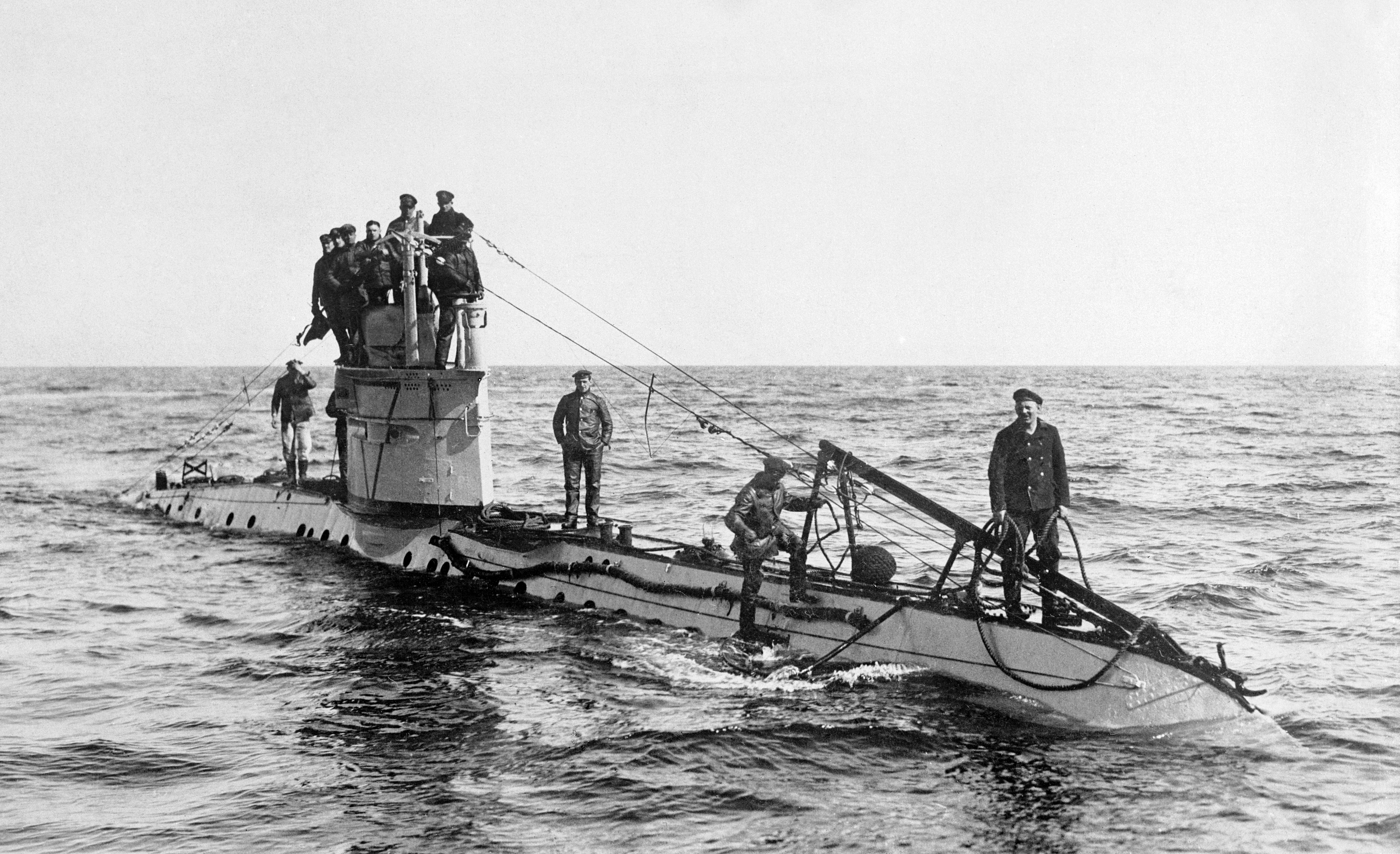
German UC-1-class World War I submarine. The wires running up from the bow to the conning tower are the jumping wires

A jumping wire is a wire cable stretched between the bow and stern of a submarine, via the conning tower or periscope standards.

Its purpose is to allow the submarine to pass under nets and other marine defences, without the obstruction snagging on the vessel's superstructure, the wire causing the net to ride up and over the top of the submarine.

Jumping wires have fallen out of use since the end of World War II, as the wire tends to vibrate at high underwater speeds creating noise that may be detected by an enemy using passive sonar, as well as causing hydrodynamic drag.
