= Spanish Shark-class submarine =

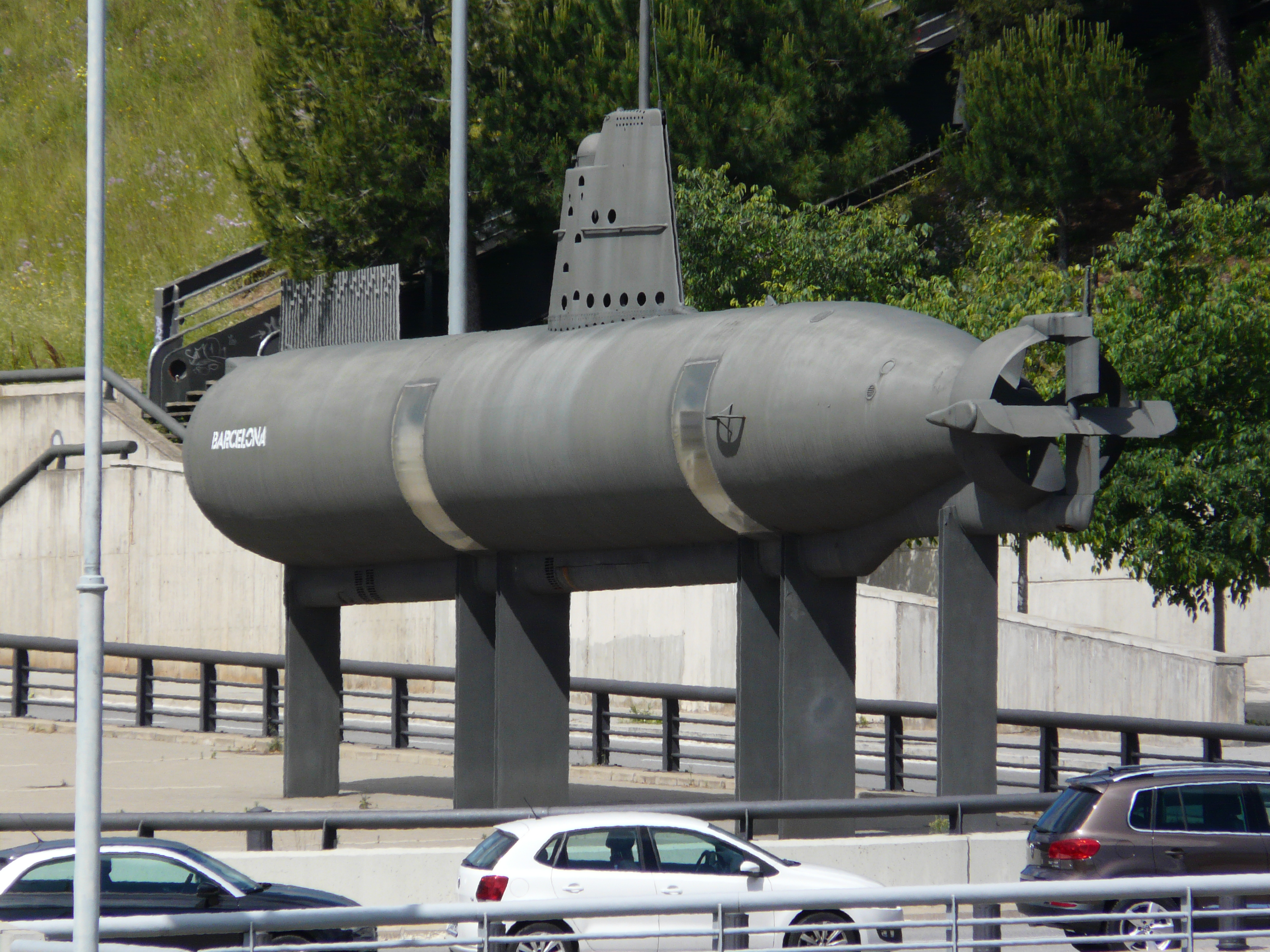
- Tiburón-I (SA-51), preserved in Barcelona

Class overview
- Operators: Spanish Navy
- Preceded by: Foca Class
- Succeeded by: Balao Class
- Built: 1964
- Planned: 2
- Completed: 2
- Retired: 2
- Preserved: 2

General characteristics
- Class & type: Shark Class
- Displacement: 76.80 long tons (78 t)
- Length: 18.8 m (61 ft 8 in)
- Beam: 2.4 m (7 ft 10 in)
- Propulsion: 2 diesel engines; 2 electric engines; 1 shaft
- Speed: 10 knots (19 km/h; 12 mph) surfaced; 14.5 knots (26.9 km/h; 16.7 mph) submerged
- Range: 1 week
- Complement: 5 persons
- Armament: 2 torpedoes

Clase Tiburón ('Shark-class') was a class of mini submarines of the Spanish Navy built in 1964. Only two units were built. Tiburón-I (SA-51) is conserved as a museum ship in Barcelona and Tiburón-II (SA-52) in Cartagena.

== Design ==
With a crew of five men, Tiburon-class submarines were intended to carry out week-long missions, would be ideal for operating in shallow waters and carrying special forces behind the enemy lines. They were equipped with a greater accommodation than the preceding Foca-class, with a bathroom and two bunk beds, which allowed the crew to rest in "hot bed" shifts.

The design was based upon the German minisubmarine Hai-class. The submarines had two diesel engines (115 HP) and two electric engines (110 HP). The armament was two torpedoes. The sail was larger than the previous class which helps in the surveillance tasks. The submarines were armed with two 533 mm tubes capable of carrying G7a or G7e torpedoes.

== History and current status ==
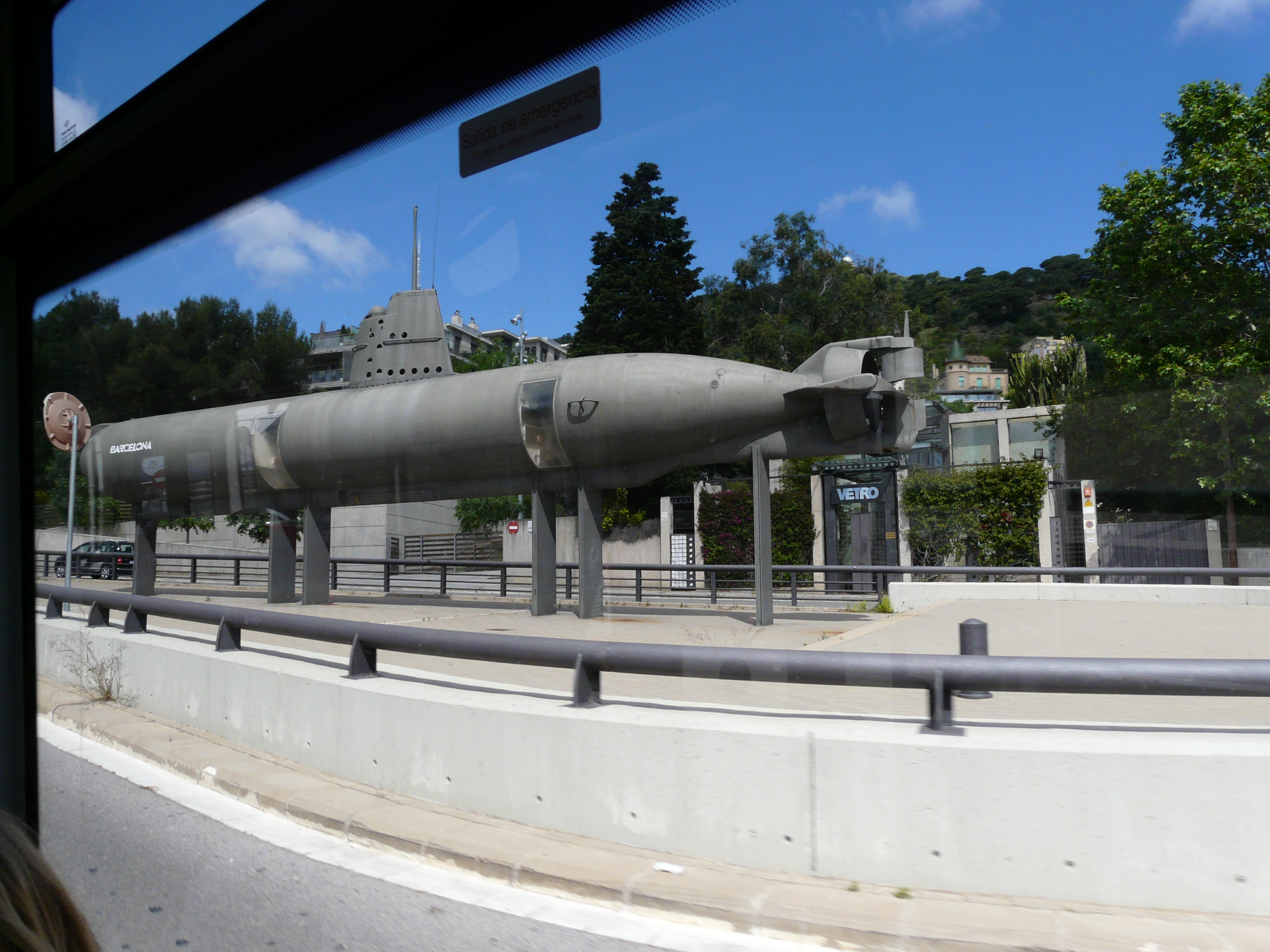
Profile view of the Tiburón-I (SA-51), preserved in the Barcelona Science Museum.

The Tiburón-class had only two units, SA-51 and SA-52, but despite an improved version of the previous class, never got to join the navy. The submarines were in the Naval Week of Barcelona in 1966, one of them, SA-52, arrive from Cartagena on her own.

On May 9, 1986, the SA-51 submarine was donated to the La Caixa Foundation for its science museum, now called "CosmoCaixa". The submarine is on display in front of the museum entrance.

The SA-52 remains on display at the Isaac Peral Naval Base in Cartagena.

== See also ==
- Spanish Navy
- List of submarines of the Spanish Navy
- List of retired Spanish Navy ships
