= USS Bang =

Submarine of the United States

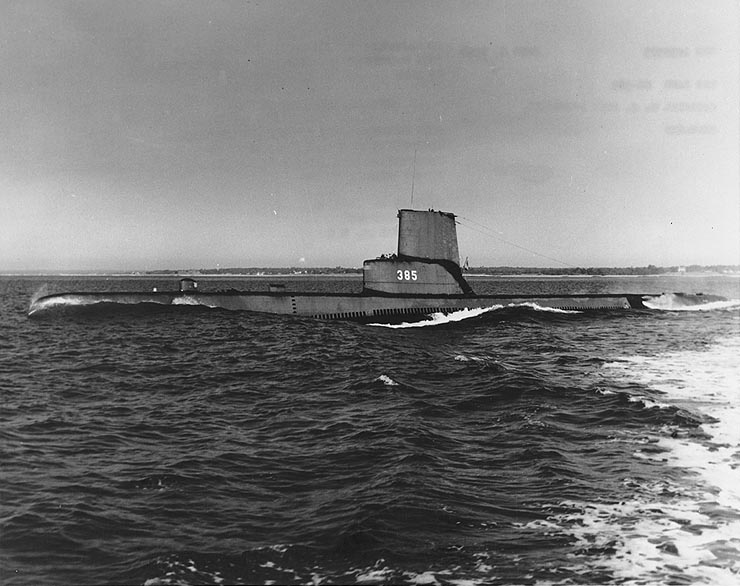
- USS Bang underway, 6 June 1958.

History

United States
- Name: USS Bang (SS-385)
- Builder: Portsmouth Naval Shipyard, Kittery, Maine
- Laid down: 30 April 1943
- Launched: 30 August 1943
- Commissioned: 4 December 1943
- Decommissioned: 12 February 1947
- Recommissioned: 1 February 1951
- Decommissioned: 15 May 1952
- Recommissioned: 4 October 1952
- Decommissioned: 1 October 1972
- Stricken: 1 November 1974
- Fate: Transferred to Spain, 1 October 1972

Spain
- Name: Cosme Garcia (S34)
- Fate: Scrapped in 1983

General characteristics (World War II)
- Class & type: Balao-class diesel-electric submarine
- Displacement: 1,526 long tons (1,550 t) surfaced, 2,391 long tons (2,429 t) submerged
- Length: 311 ft 6 in (94.95 m)
- Beam: 27 ft 3 in (8.31 m)
- Draft: 16 ft 10 in (5.13 m) maximum
- Propulsion: 4 × Fairbanks-Morse Model 38D8-⅛ 10-cylinder opposed piston diesel engines driving electrical generators; 2 × 126-cell Sargo batteries; 4 × high-speed Elliott electric motors with reduction gears; two propellers; 5,400 shp (4.0 MW) surfaced; 2,740 shp (2.0 MW) submerged
- Speed: 20.25 kn (37.50 km/h) surfaced, 8.75 kn (16.21 km/h) submerged
- Range: 11,000 nmi (20,000 km) @ 10 kn (19 km/h)
- Endurance: 48 hours @ 2 kn (3.7 km/h) submerged, 75 days on patrol
- Test depth: 400 ft (120 m)
- Complement: 10 officers, 70–71 enlisted
- Armament: 10 × 21-inch (533 mm) torpedo tubes; 6 forward, 4 aft; 24 torpedoes; 1 × 5-inch (127 mm) / 25 caliber deck gun; Bofors 40 mm and Oerlikon 20 mm cannon

General characteristics (Guppy IIA)
- Class & type: none
- Displacement: 1,848 tons (1,878 t) surfaced, 2,440 tons (2,479 t) submerged
- Length: 307 ft (94 m)
- Beam: 27 ft 4 in (8.33 m)
- Draft: 17 ft (5.2 m)
- Propulsion: Submarine snorkel added, One diesel engine and generator removed, Batteries upgraded to Sargo II
- Speed: Surfaced: 17.0 kn (31.5 km/h) (maximum); 13.5 kn (25.0 km/h) (cruising); Submerged: 14.1 kn (26.1 km/h) (for ½ hour); 8.0 kn (14.8 km/h) (snorkeling); 3.0 kn (5.6 km/h) (cruising)
- Armament: 10 × 21 inch (533 mm) torpedo tubes; (six forward, four aft); all guns removed

USS Bang (SS-385) was a United States Navy Balao-class submarine, named after the bang, a dark blue or black fish of the Atlantic herring family found in the coastal waters of the United States north of North Carolina.

== Construction and commissioning ==
Bang was laid down on 30 April 1943 at Kittery, Maine, by the Portsmouth Naval Shipyard; launched on 30 August 1943, sponsored by Mrs. Robert W. Neblett; and commissioned on 4 December 1943, Lt. Cmdr. Antone R. Gallaher in command.

== Service history ==
=== United States Navy ===
==== World War II ====
Following four weeks of shakedown training off New England, the submarine departed New London, Conn. on 8 February 1944 and headed for the Pacific. After transiting the Panama Canal, she proceeded to Pearl Harbor for intensified training in torpedo approaches, evasive maneuvers, and simulated warfare. As March came to an end, Bang was fully provisioned and ready for battle.

On the 29th, she departed Pearl Harbor in company with Parche and Tinosa for her first war patrol. After a one-day fueling stop at Midway Atoll, the trio continued to their patrol area in Luzon Strait and waters southwest of Formosa.

The three submarines exchanged contact information and coordinated attack plans throughout the patrol. On 29 April, Bang sighted a 12-ship, southbound convoy. After maneuvering into a favorable position, she fired her torpedoes into the convoy, sinking Takegawa Maru. The submarine continued to hound the convoy during the night and, the following morning, sank Nittatsu Maru. The enemy rained down depth charges on Bang, but training in evasive maneuvers and a bit of good luck enabled her to escape damage.

Tinosa sighted a northbound Japanese convoy on 3 May, and Bang moved in to pursue its 10 ships. Her first attempt to attack during daylight was foiled by enemy plane and surface escorts which forced her to dive. After dark, she and her colleagues coordinated a surface attack in which Bang sank Kinrei Maru, and claimed the destruction of a destroyer, which was not confirmed by postwar study of Japanese records. Since all of her torpedoes had been expended, Bang departed the area on 6 May and arrived at Midway on the 14th for refit alongside Proteus.

On 6 June, Bang put to sea on her second war patrol, the timing of which coincided with the preliminaries to the Mariana Islands invasion. Consequently, she was assigned to waters to the west of that island group so that she would be in position to intercept any Japanese warships or transports steaming eastward to parry the American offensive thrust. While en route to her station, the submarine encountered a lone northbound tanker on 14 June. Although hampered by heavy rain squalls and turbulent seas, Bang launched a spread of three torpedoes, one of which hit and damaged the target, but did not sink her. The submarine could not finish off this enemy ship because her orders required her to take station as soon as possible.

Marines landed on Saipan on the 15th, and that event goaded the Japanese Mobile Fleet to make a desperate attempt to turn back this Allied threat to the Emperor's inner defense line, in which the Marianas acted as a major link, if not the keystone. Bang reached her station that same day but spent an uneventful week while Admiral Raymond Spruance's 5th Fleet was trouncing the Japanese task force in the Battle of the Philippine Sea, virtually wiping out the enemy's naval air capability for the remainder of the war.

On 22 June, the day after that epic engagement ended, she rendezvoused with Growler and Seahorse off Formosa to form a coordinated attack group. Growler was detached just one day before the unit's run in with southbound convoy Hi-67 of more than 15 ships. Bang made a submerged attack and fired 10 torpedoes at three overlapping targets, all of which the submarine claims to have sunk, although the postwar records do not confirm the claim. The enemy escorts turned and pursued Bang, dropping 125 depth charges over her as she went deep to avoid destruction. When Bang finally surfaced, the convoy was disappearing over the horizon.

On 4 July, Bang sighted a small Hong Kong-bound convoy consisting of one cargo ship and four destroyer escorts. She approached the convoy on the surface, but before she could maneuver into a good attack position, an alert escort began to search for the attacker. Bang launched three torpedoes without making adequate attack solutions, and all three missed their targets. The submarine was forced to dive and maneuver to avoid the depth charges dropped by the escort and was unable to mount another attack.

On 17 July, the ship headed back to Pearl Harbor for refit, which continued into the last week of August. She left Pearl Harbor again on the 27th, refueled at Midway on 31 August, and continued to waters northeast of Formosa off the Nansei Shoto. While passing northwest of the Bonin Islands to take up her station, Bang encountered an enemy convoy on 9 September. Diving to make a periscope attack, she fired a salvo at two loaded freighters, both of which – Tokiwasan Maru and Shoryu Maru – disintegrated due to internal explosions triggered by the hits. The escorts evidently sighted Bang's periscope and torpedo wakes, because as she dove deep, the depth charges accurately drove her down beyond her test depth to 580 ft (180 m), where depth control almost disappeared. A pattern of 16 charges exploded directly over the boat, but Bang waited out her enemies. The escorts departed apparently satisfied that they had scored a kill, but Bang suffered only minor damage which her crew easily repaired. Three days later, she arrived on station.

Early on 19 September, Bang made radar contact on another enemy convoy, submerged, and fired on two of the ships. Tosei Maru No. 2 sank, while the other ship suffered substantial damage. Working as a team, three enemy escorts systematically depth bombed the submarine, but she again successfully outmaneuvered her pursuers and surfaced after dark.

While submerged on the afternoon of 20 September, she encountered an eastbound convoy and shadowed it until darkness fell to cover her attack. She surfaced, fired her remaining 10 torpedoes, and claimed to have sunk a large tanker and a medium freighter as well as damaging another ship. The next day, she headed for Midway and refit.

Repaired, refueled, and replenished, Bang got underway again on 25 October and, with Shad and Redfish, returned to the same area. Typhoon weather precluded effective operations during the early part of the fourth war patrol. Finally, on 22 November, improved weather enabled Bang to attack a convoy initially reported by Redfish. Between midnight and 0300 on the 23d, all three submarines conducted coordinated attacks on the convoy. Bang fired all 24 of her torpedoes in a series of seven surface attacks, sinking two cargo ships – Sakae Maru and Amakusa Maru. She reported also destroying a minelayer escort and another freighter, but Japanese records did not corroborate these kills. Between the three submarines, the convoy was totally destroyed.

Later that day, Bang headed for Hawaii and arrived at Pearl Harbor on 5 December for refit. Following a restful holiday period, the submarine departed Oahu on 2 January 1945 and set a course for Saipan. There, on 15 January, she joined with Spadefish, Atule, and Pompon and sailed for a patrol area in the East China and Yellow Seas. Bad weather and a scarcity of targets denied Bang opportunities to attack any enemy shipping before she departed the area on 19 February, without any kills. She arrived at Guam on the 24th for refit alongside Proteus.

Bang's sixth and last patrol began on 25 March when she got underway for Luzon Strait. After 10 days of patrol, she was ordered to take lifeguard station northeast of Formosa during strikes on northern Formosa and the southern Ryukyu Islands in support of the Allied struggle for Okinawa. On 21 April, Bang rescued a Navy pilot who had ditched his plane after it had been damaged by flak during a strafing run.

On 3 May, the submarine received orders to return to Hawaii. She refueled at Saipan and continued on to Pearl Harbor where she arrived on 18 May. After 10 days of recreation and inspection of the boat, additional orders sent her back to the United States for overhaul at the Portsmouth Navy Yard. She stopped at San Francisco Naval Shipyard, then continued on through the Panama Canal and up the Atlantic coast to Portsmouth where she arrived on 22 June. The submarine was still undergoing overhaul when hostilities ended. Following completion of the overhaul, Bang operated out of New London in the early postwar period. She was placed out of commission on 12 February 1947 and entered the Atlantic Reserve Fleet.

==== Post-War ====
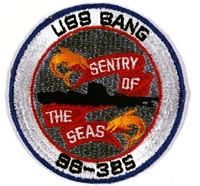
Patch from USS Bang

On 1 February 1951, Bang was recommissioned at the U.S. Naval Submarine Base, New London, Lieutenant Commander Eugene A. Hemley in command, but spent only 15 months on active duty with the Atlantic Fleet before being decommissioned again on 15 May 1952 for conversion and modernization. Following work at the Portsmouth Naval Shipyard, Bang was recommissioned as a GUPPY IIA submarine, the first of her type to serve the U.S. Navy, on 4 October 1952. Although her outward appearance remained the same, Bang's internal arrangements were improved and incorporated impressive advances in ordnance and electronic gear. Her hull was streamlined and additional power added to the engineering plant to provide increased submerged speed.

After operating with the fleet in the Atlantic Ocean and Mediterranean Sea for two years, Bang entered the Philadelphia Naval Shipyard for a routine overhaul in August 1954. Upon completion of the overhaul in December, she rejoined the fleet with still more modern equipment. The submarine carried out normal operations along the eastern seaboard primarily engaged in training missions with other submarines and with surface antisubmarine units. She left her home port of New London in July 1957 to begin another overhaul in Portsmouth. When she came out in January 1958, she resumed peacetime operations, including a midshipmen training cruise during the summer of 1958 to Spain and Denmark, a four-month deployment to the Mediterranean and northern Europe in 1962, deployment to the Mediterranean from early January through early May 1965, and participation in Operation "Springboard" in the Caribbean in 1966. Between these cruises and major yard work in 1961, 1962, 1966, 1967, and 1970, Bang provided training services to Basic Submarine School in New London as well as to units of the Atlantic Fleet.

=== Spanish Navy ===
Early in 1972, Bang was designated for transfer to the Spanish Navy on a five-year loan. Following upkeep to lengthen her safe submerged operations limit, Bang returned to New London to train Spanish sailors in preparation for the transfer. On 1 October 1972, Bang was decommissioned and transferred to the Spanish government. She was recommissioned as Cosme Garcia (S34). On 1 November 1974, her name was struck from the Naval Vessel Register and the transfer to Spain was made permanent by sale.

== Awards ==
Bang received six battle stars for her World War II service. She is officially credited with sinking eight Japanese merchant ships totaling 20,177 tons.

== See also ==
- List of submarines of the Spanish Navy
