= Spanish submarine Delfín =

Submarine in the Spanish Navy

Coordinates: 37.972525°N 0.681258°W

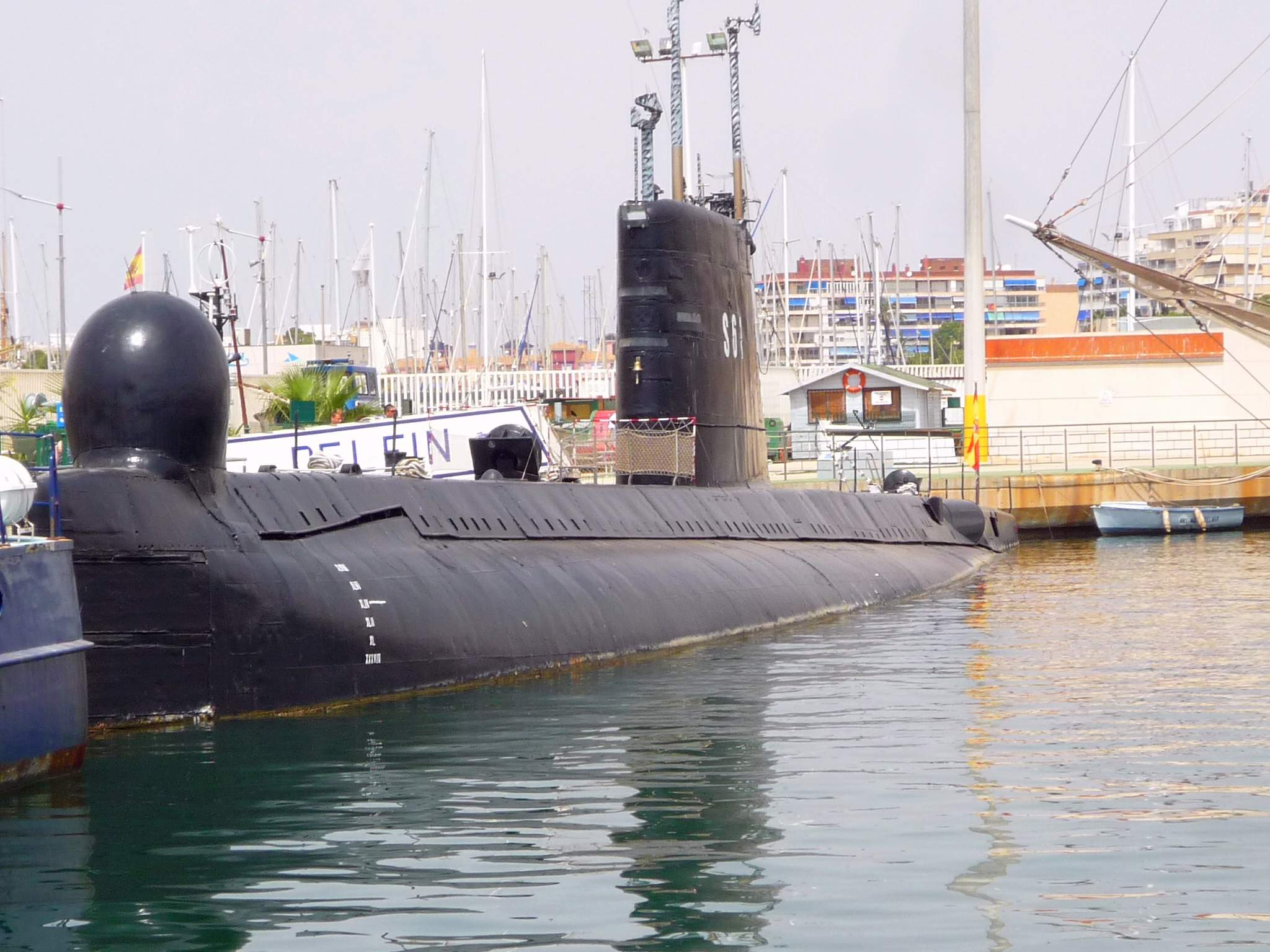
- Delfín moored at Torrevieja as a museum ship in 2017.

History

Spain
- Name: Delfín
- Builder: Bazán, Cartagena, Spain
- Laid down: 13 August 1968
- Launched: 25 March 1972
- Commissioned: 3 May 1973
- Decommissioned: 10 September 2003
- Home port: Cartagena, Spain
- Identification: Pennant number S61
- Status: Museum ship in Torrevieja

General characteristics
- Class & type: Daphné-class submarine
- Displacement: 860 tonnes (846 long tons) surfaced; 1,038 tonnes (1,022 long tons) submerged
- Length: 57.75 m (189 ft 6 in)
- Beam: 6.74 m (22 ft 1 in)
- Depth: 5.25 m (17 ft 3 in)
- Propulsion: 2 × 450 kW (603 hp) SEMT Pielstick-Jeumont-Schneider Type 12 diesel engines; 2 × 1,000 hp (746 kW) electric motors; 2 shafts
- Speed: 12 knots (22 km/h; 14 mph) surfaced; 8 knots (15 km/h; 9.2 mph) snorkeling; 15 knots (28 km/h; 17 mph) submerged
- Range: 10,000 nmi (19,000 km; 12,000 mi) at 7 knots (13 km/h; 8.1 mph) surfaced
- Endurance: 30 days
- Test depth: 300 m (980 ft)
- Complement: 6 officers; 24 non-commissioned officers; 20 sailors
- Sensors & processing systems: DRUA 31 radar; DUUA 2B sonar; DSUV 2 passive sonar; DUUX acoustic telemeter
- Electronic warfare & decoys: ARUR 10B radar detector
- Armament: 12 × 550 mm (22 in) torpedo tubes (8 bow, 4 stern); 12 × torpedoes or missiles

Delfín (Dolphin in Spanish) is a diesel-electric submarine of the Daphné class (known in Spain as the Delfín class) that was used by the Spanish Navy between 1973 and 2003. During the submarine's 30 years of service, the vessel participated in various national and international exercises and maneuvers, made more than 2,500 voyages, more than 30,000 hours of immersion and served in this submarine more than a thousand sailors. At the time of her retirement, she was the longest-serving submarine in the history of the Spanish Submarine Fleet.

In 2004 Delfín was donated by the navy to the town of Torrevieja (province of Alicante, Valencian Community) and converted into a museum ship, thus becoming the first "floating museum" of these characteristics in Spain. It is part of the Museo del Mar y de la Sal (Museum of the Sea and Salt). In the first ten years as a museum it received more than a million visitors.

== Construction and features ==
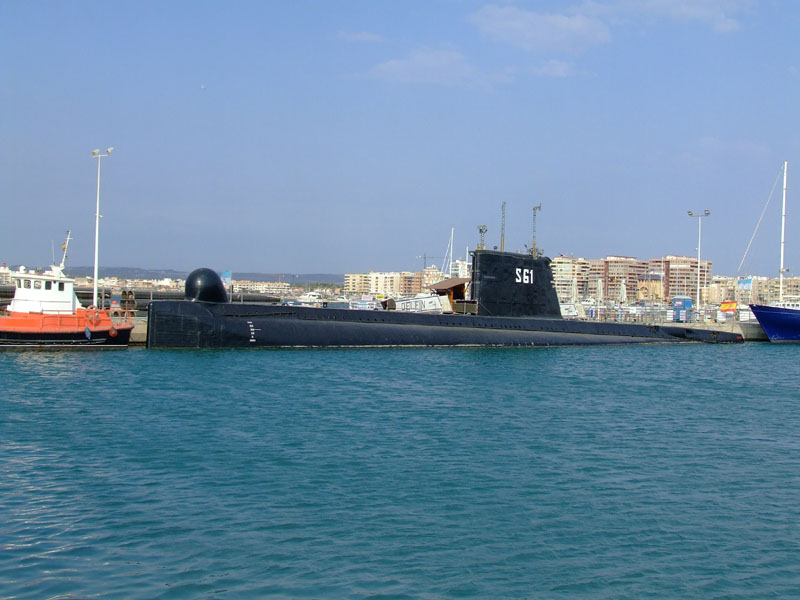
Delfín preserved as a museum ship in Torrevieja (Alicante)

The submarine was built in the shipyards of Cartagena (Murcia). Its keel laying was carried out on August 13, 1968 and it was launched on March 25, 1972.

It is a French-designed Daphné-class submarine (known as the Delfín class or S-60 series in Spain) displaces 860 t on the surface, while submerged it displaced 1040 t. It has a length of 57.75 metres (189 ft 6 in), a beam of 6.74 m (22 ft 1 in) and a draft of 5.25 m (17 ft 3 in). It was propelled by a diesel-electric system, made up of two diesel engines and two electric motors that power two propellers, with allowed it to reach 13 knots (24 km/h; 15 mph) on the surface, and 15.5 knots (28.7 km/h; 17.8 mph) submerged. The submarine was designed to dive to a depth of 300 m (980 ft) and could stay at sea for 30 days.

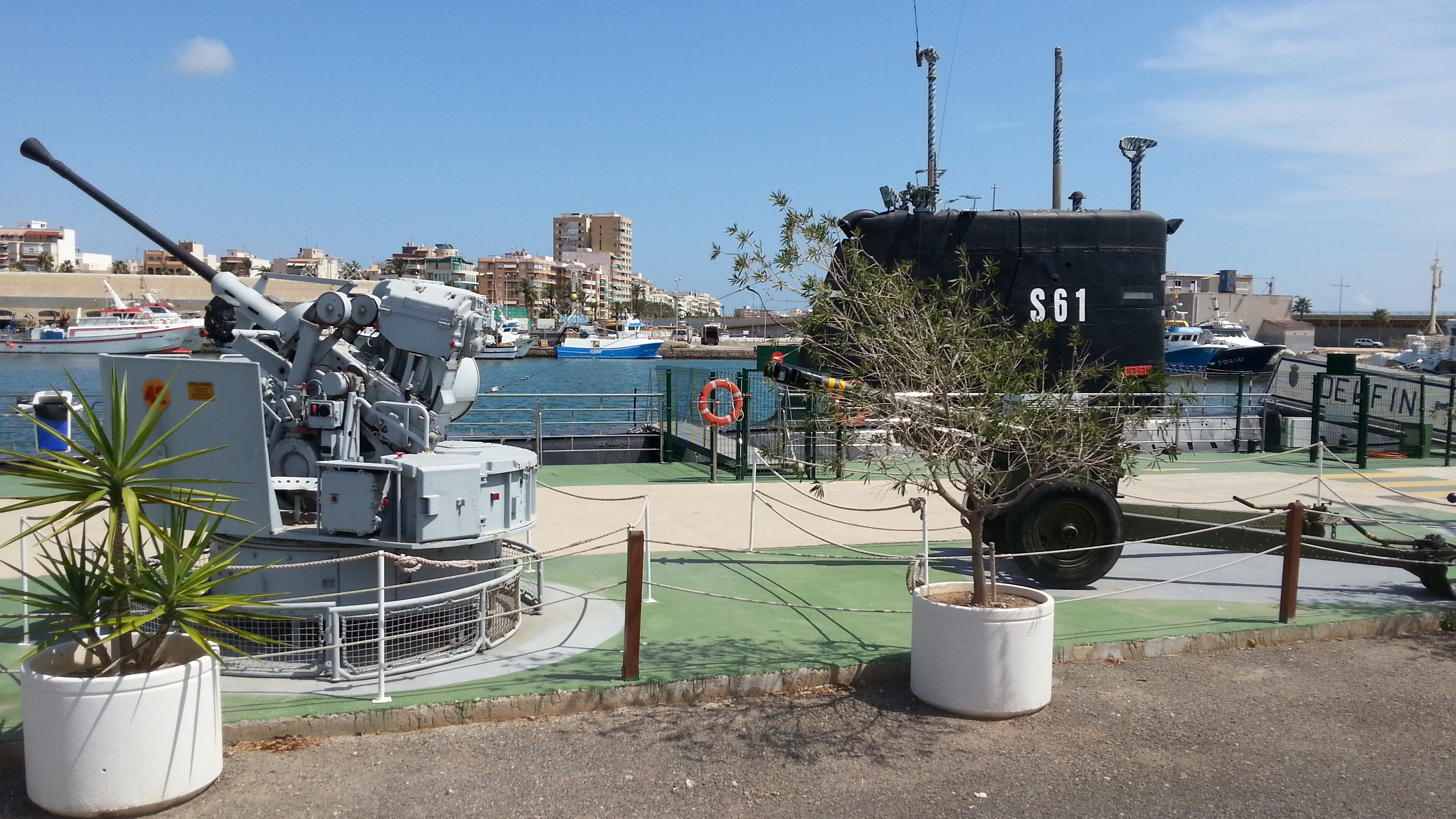
Delfín's sail on the Paseo Dique de Levante in 2014

The submarine has twelve 550-millimetre (22 in) torpedo tubes; eight tubes in the bow, two in the stern and one in each fin. While the forward tubes contain full-length torpedoes (either for use against a ship or against a submarine), the aft tubes only contain shorter torpedoes (only against submarines, in self-defense). It has the possibility of replacing torpedoes with naval mines, but cannot carry reserve torpedoes due to the limited space available.

It is designed for to patrols against surface or submarine forces, attack on maritime traffic, ship recognition, naval mine distribution and special operations.

== Service history ==
The Delfin-class submarine defense program (also called the S-60 series) was approved by the National Defense Board on November 17, 1964 by Minister of the Navy Pedro Nieto Antúnez comprised the first two submarines, later expanded to two plus and financed by law 85/65 of November 17. With an initial cost of 700 million pesetas for the first two, the third in the series rose to 1,040 million pesetas (1964).

The names and numbers of the units in the series were assigned by ministerial order 218/73 of March 29. They were named after marine animals: Delfín (Dolphin), Tonina, Marsopa (Porpoise) and Narval (Narwhal), which had a certain precedent in the fleeting Foca class (Seal class) and Tiburón class (Shark class), although, with few exceptions (those mentioned above and the Peral, Monturiol, Cosme García, García de los Reyes, Mola and Sanjurjo), the submarines of the Spanish Navy used to be identified until then only by their numerals.

The Delfín was registered in the official list of the Navy on May 3, 1973 in the port of Cartagena in a ceremony attended by the then Minister of the Navy Admiral Adolfo Baturone Colombo.

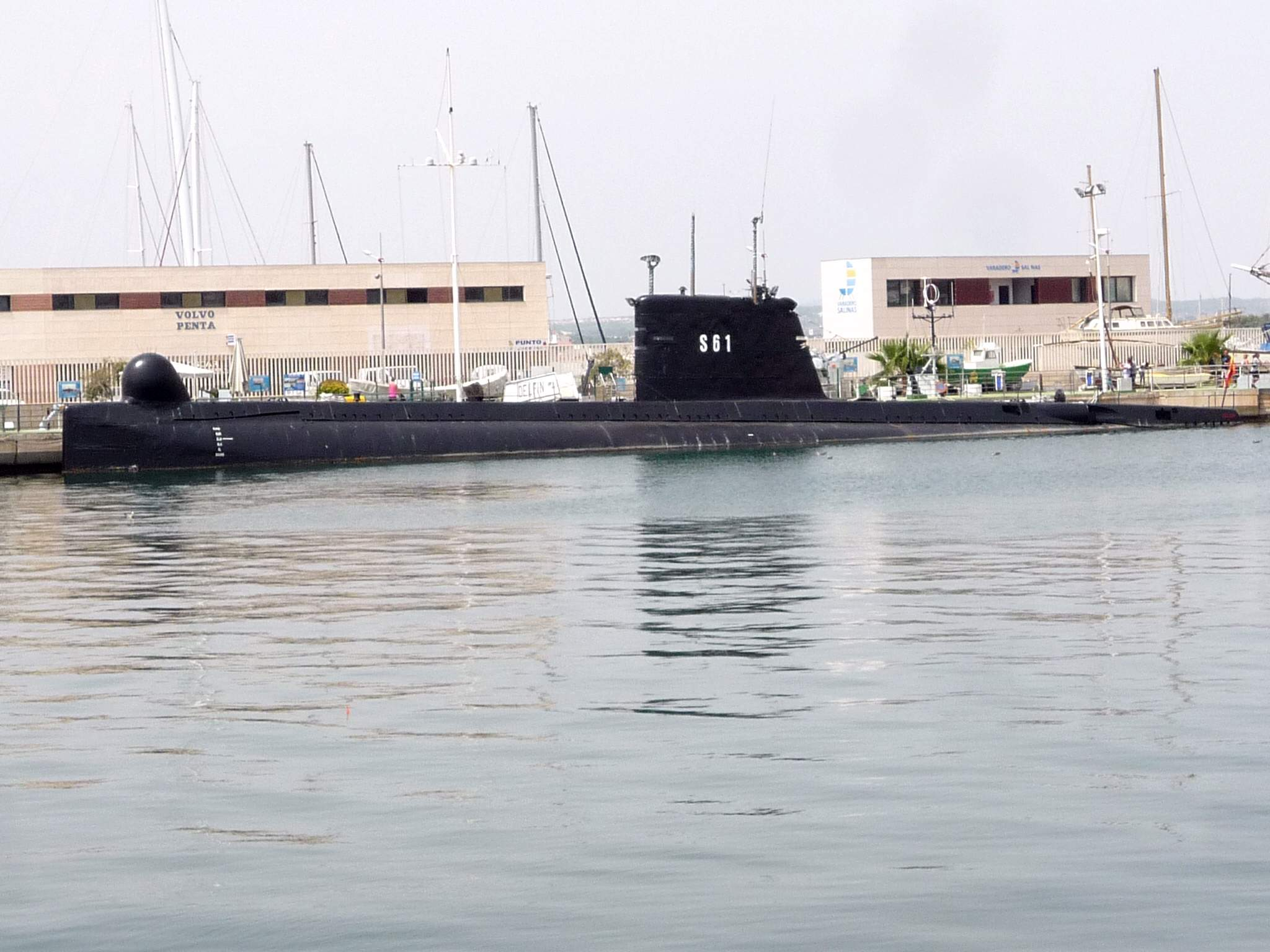
Profile view of the Delfín, moored in the port of Torrevieja in 2017

Throughout its operational life, the Delfín participated in several international maneuvers together with ships from other countries, for example in June 1996 it participated in the Tapón ’96 maneuvers together with the Spanish ships Príncipe de Asturias, Santa María, Numancia and Baleares, the Americans USS Grayling and USS Conolly and the Greek destroyer Formion.

Between 1984 and 1988, during their first major careening, the Delfín-class submarines underwent a modernization that fundamentally included the weapons system, to be able to launch wire-guided torpedoes and the dsm (underwater detection) system. The modernization gave a somewhat different look to the bow of the submarines, changing the bow dome, where the sonar is located.

In 1985 the submarine mistakenly fired a torpedo at the Cartagena base.

On May 27, 1989, King Juan Carlos I reviewed the fleet at a naval stop in the waters of Barcelona. In this naval parade, the Dédalo, Príncipe de Asturias, the Baleares-class frigates: Andalucía, Extremadura and Victoria, the Descubierta-class corvettes, Diana, Vencedora and Infanta Cristina, the submarines Delfín and Marsopa participated, among other smaller units; as well as representatives of other countries, among others, the French Foch, the Italian Giuseppe Garibaldi, the American missile cruiser USS Belknap and the Portuguese frigate Comandante Hermenegildo Capelo.

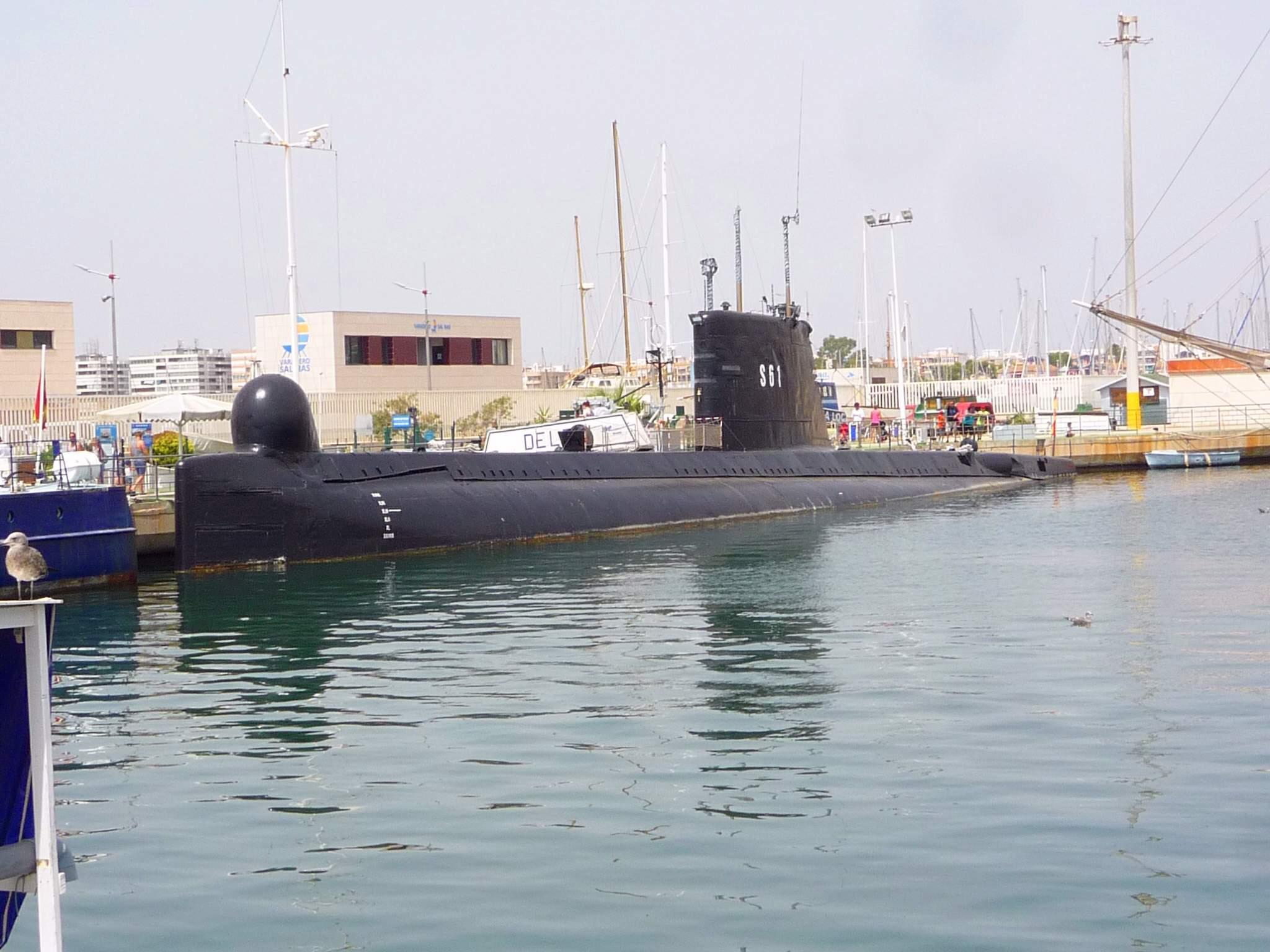
Delfín (S-61), anchored in the port of Torrevieja in 2017.

In 1994 it suffered damage to the fairing of the free movement after a self-launched exercise torpedo hit it. The torpedo made a strange trajectory and ended up attacking the launch ship.

The Delfín-class submarines were decommissioned between 2003 and 2006; in the particular case of the Delfín it was officially decommissioned on September 10, 2003 (although it was planned to do so on July 2, 2003, the Portuguese Navy was interested in it and although in the end no agreement was reached its discharge was postponed). At that time, she was the Spanish submarine that had served the longest uninterruptedly in the Spanish Navy, after 30 years of service.

== Museum ship ==
It was donated by the Spanish Navy as a museum ship since 2004 to the city of Torrevieja (Alicante), a town that sponsored it for the Navy after its launch and gave it its first combat flag in 1971. Specifically, it arrived towed by the civilian tugboat Sea Nostromo Primero on May 8, 2004. Since then, she has been moored in the port of that town and is part of the Museo del Mar y de la Sal (Museum of the Sea and Salt). After its installation there in the first ten years it exceeded a million visits.

In 2015, the submarine participated in an international amateur radio transmission for 48 hours in an initiative that tried to put all the existing floating museums in the world in contact. In 2019 it became the first floating museum to be adapted for people with functional diversity.

== See also ==
- List of submarines of the Spanish Navy
- List of retired Spanish Navy ships
