= Torpedo net =

Passive ship defensive device against torpedoes

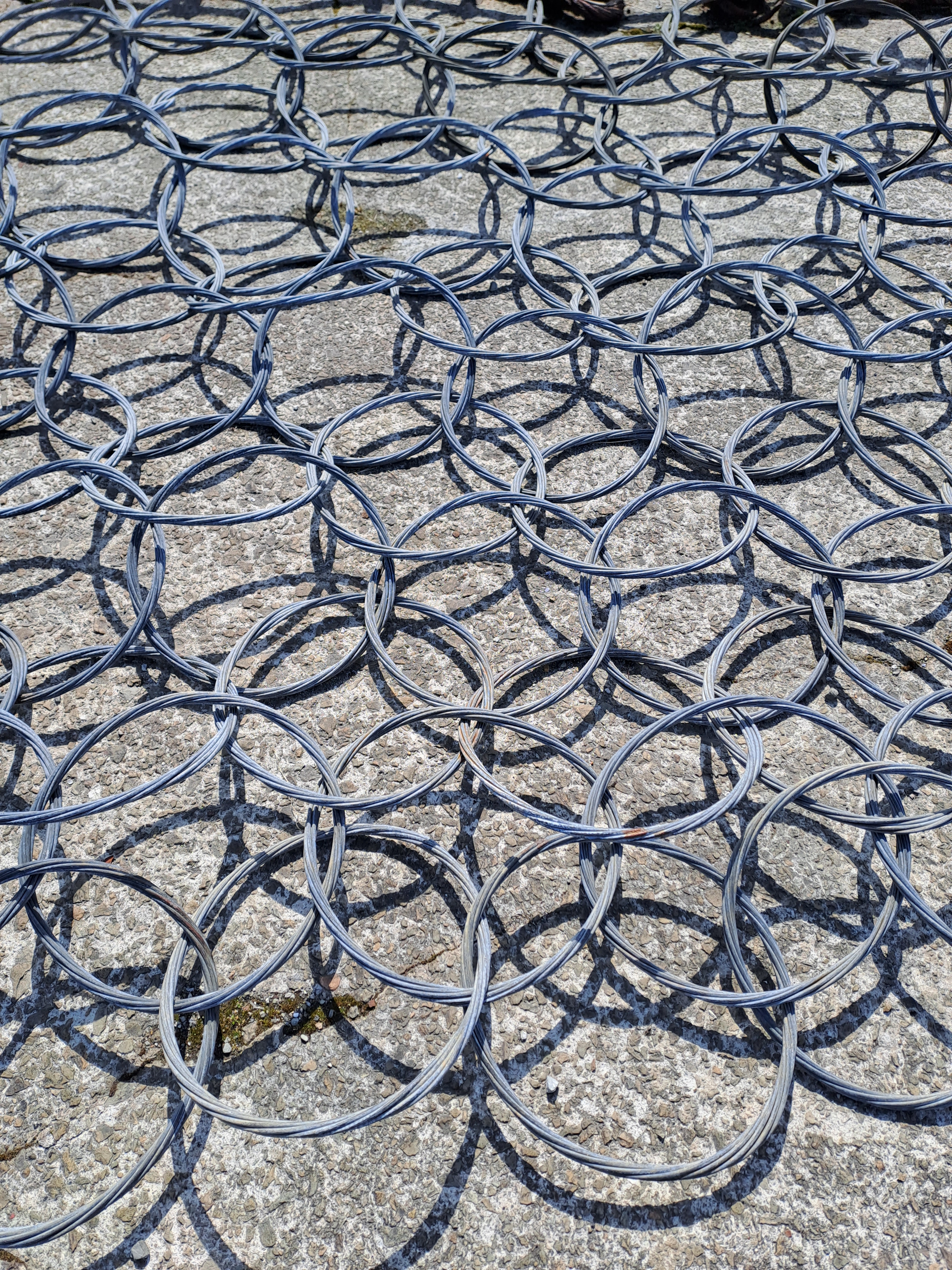
An example of torpedo netting at the Scapa Flow museum, Orkney

Torpedo nets were a passive ship defensive device against torpedoes. They were in common use from the 1890s until the Second World War. They were superseded by the anti-torpedo bulge and torpedo belts.

== Origins ==
With the introduction of the Whitehead torpedo in 1873, and the subsequent development of the torpedo boat, new means were sought to protect capital ships against underwater attacks. In 1876 the British Admiralty Torpedo Committee came up with a number of recommendations for combating torpedoes, which included "... nets of galvanised iron hung around each battleship from projecting 40 ft spars". Experiments were conducted in 1877, with HMS Thunderer becoming the first operational ship to be fitted with the nets.

== Design and use ==
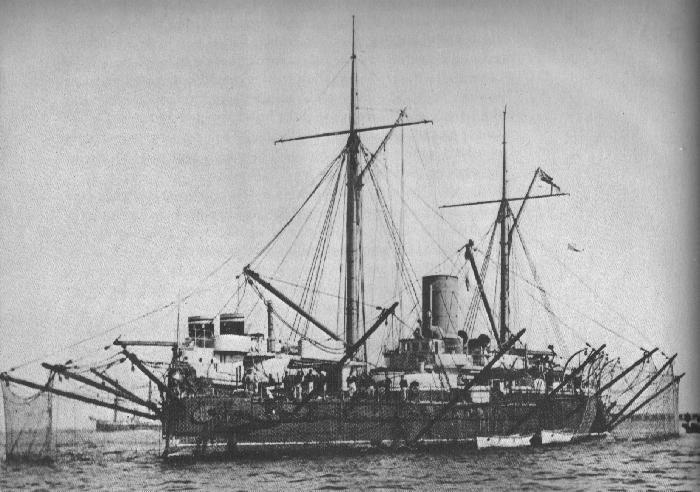
HMS Hotspur deploying torpedo nets

Torpedo nets could be hung out from the defending ship, when moored or otherwise stationary in the water, on multiple horizontal booms. Each boom was fixed to the ship at one end at or below the edge of the main deck, by a steel pin that permitted the boom to be swung against the ship and secured when the ship sailed. A series of such booms was so fixed at intervals along each side of the ship. When the ship was moored, the free ends of the booms could be swung out with the net hung on the outer ends, thus suspending the net at a distance from the ship equal to the length of the boom, all around the ship. With the net mounted, a torpedo aimed at the ship would hit the mesh net and explode at a sufficient distance from the hull to prevent serious damage to the ship.

== Wooden versus steel booms ==
Early booms were made of wood, originally 10 inches (250 mm) in diameter but increased in the 1880s to 12 inches (300 mm). Each boom weighed 20 to 24 long cwt (1,000 to 1,200 kg) and cost £28 to £30. In the House of Commons on 9 April 1888 Admiral Field, who was MP for Eastbourne, asserted that steel booms designed by William Bullivant were at least 5 long cwt (250 kg) lighter, one-third less expensive and "superior in many other respects", and asked Lord George Hamilton, First Lord of the Admiralty whether the Committee on Torpedo Net Defence had recommended steel booms and whether the Admiralty would further test them. In reply the First Lord claimed that steel booms doubled up on impact, were more vulnerable to accidental damage, and were harder to repair aboard a ship, whereas wooden ones were easier to replace. His Lordship further stated that the steel booms that the Committee favoured were of a different type from those designed by Bullivant.

On 21 June 1888 three Opposition Liberal MPs questioned the First Lord on whether wooden booms were the best choice for either effectiveness or cost. Admiral Field claimed that the Admiralty Torpedo Committee and Dockyard officials preferred steel booms as they weighed less than 10 long cwt (510 kg) and cost £20 to £22. Field alleged that in experiments since September 1886 wooden booms "invariably failed" and that steel booms were lighter and more effective. In reply the First Lord claimed that in five experiments, wooden booms had worked on all but one occasion and that steel booms would be more expensive. When questioned by James Picton, MP for Leicester, the First Lord agreed that wooden beams were heavier. Then John Brunner, MP for Northwich, asked who was opposing steel booms, so that Parliament might debate whether to dismiss them. The First Lord ended the discussion by retorting that "it was most improper that Questions should be put to him for the purpose of advertising inventions".

== Bullivant nets ==
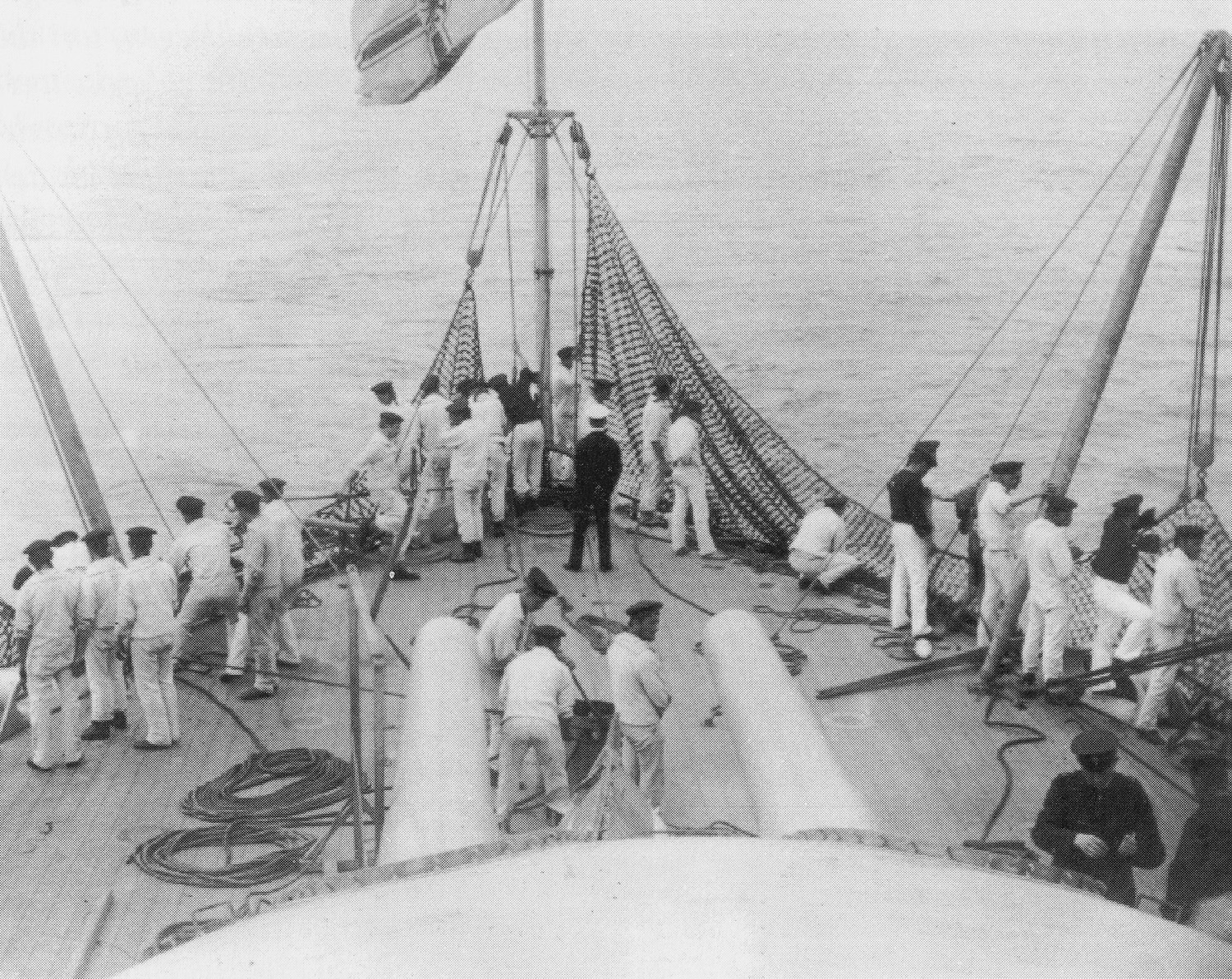
Stowing torpedo nets on SMS Weissenburg in 1896.

About 1875 William Munton Bullivant had taken over the Wire Tramway Co, a manufacturer of wire and steel rope based in Millwall, London, and turned it into Bullivant and Co. The company exhibited at trade events including the Naval and Submarine Exhibition of 1882. Bullivant developed not only steel torpedo nets but also steel booms to suspend them from ships. In 1888 Admiral Field and other Liberal MPs offended the First Sea Lord by promoting Bullivant's products in the House of Commons.

However, by the early 20th century, torpedo nets were referred to as "Bullivant type". They were made from 6 1/2-inch-diameter (170 mm) steel hoops linked by smaller hoops to form a mesh, with a weight of about one pound per square foot (5 kg/m^{2}). These nets were projected from the sides of the ship on 40-foot-long (12 m) wooden booms. Extensive tests were conducted, with the nets proving capable of stopping the contemporary 14-inch-diameter (360 mm) torpedo without being damaged. A 16-inch (410 mm) torpedo with a 91-pound (41 kg) warhead proved capable of causing limited damage to the net. A heavier net was introduced in 1894 consisting of 2 1/2-inch (64 mm) hoops with a weight of five pounds per square foot (25 kg/m^{2}).

== Torpedo net cutter ==
The adoption of these nets resulted in the introduction of the torpedo net cutter on the nose of torpedoes, either in the form of scissors in Japanese designs, or a French pistol-powered version.

Later heavier, denser nets used by the German and British navies were regarded as "torpedo-proof."

== Russo-Japanese War ==
In spite of fitting the major ships with anti-torpedo nets, and close danger of war, the Russians did not deploy the nets during the Japanese destroyer torpedo attack on the Imperial Russian Navy stationed on a roadside of Port Arthur on 8 February 1904, which was the opening shots of the Russo-Japanese War.

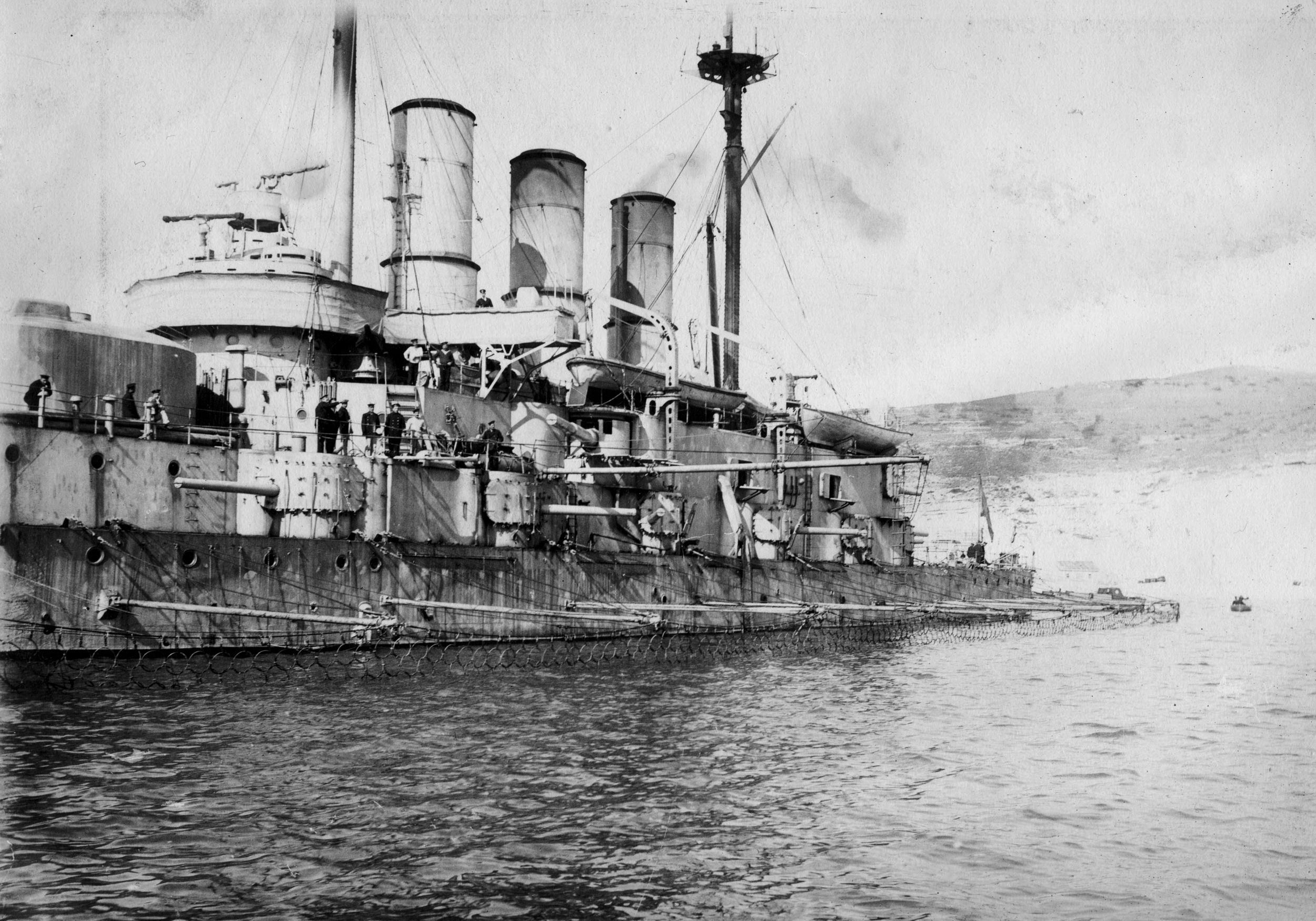
Russian battleship Evstafi with torpedo nets deployed

In other actions later in the war, nets were used effectively by the Russian battleship Sevastopol. At the end of the siege of Port Arthur she was anchored outside the harbor in a position where she was sheltered from the fire of the Japanese batteries but became exposed to persistent attacks from torpedo boats. From 11 to 16 December 1904, Sevastopol was exposed to numerous night attacks. The Japanese deployed 30 torpedo-boats, of which two were lost, and it was estimated that altogether 104 torpedoes were fired against the ship. One torpedo exploded in the nets near the bow and produced a leak in the torpedo room; another damaged the compartment forward of the collision bulkhead, because the nets yielded to such an extent that it exploded near the hull. The last two torpedoes that struck the ship were fired at close range against the unprotected stern: they damaged the rudder and produced a serious leak under the quarterdeck, so that the aft end of the ship sank until it touched the bottom. The leak was repaired, the ship was re-floated and on the last day of the siege she was taken out to deep water and scuttled.

== First World War ==
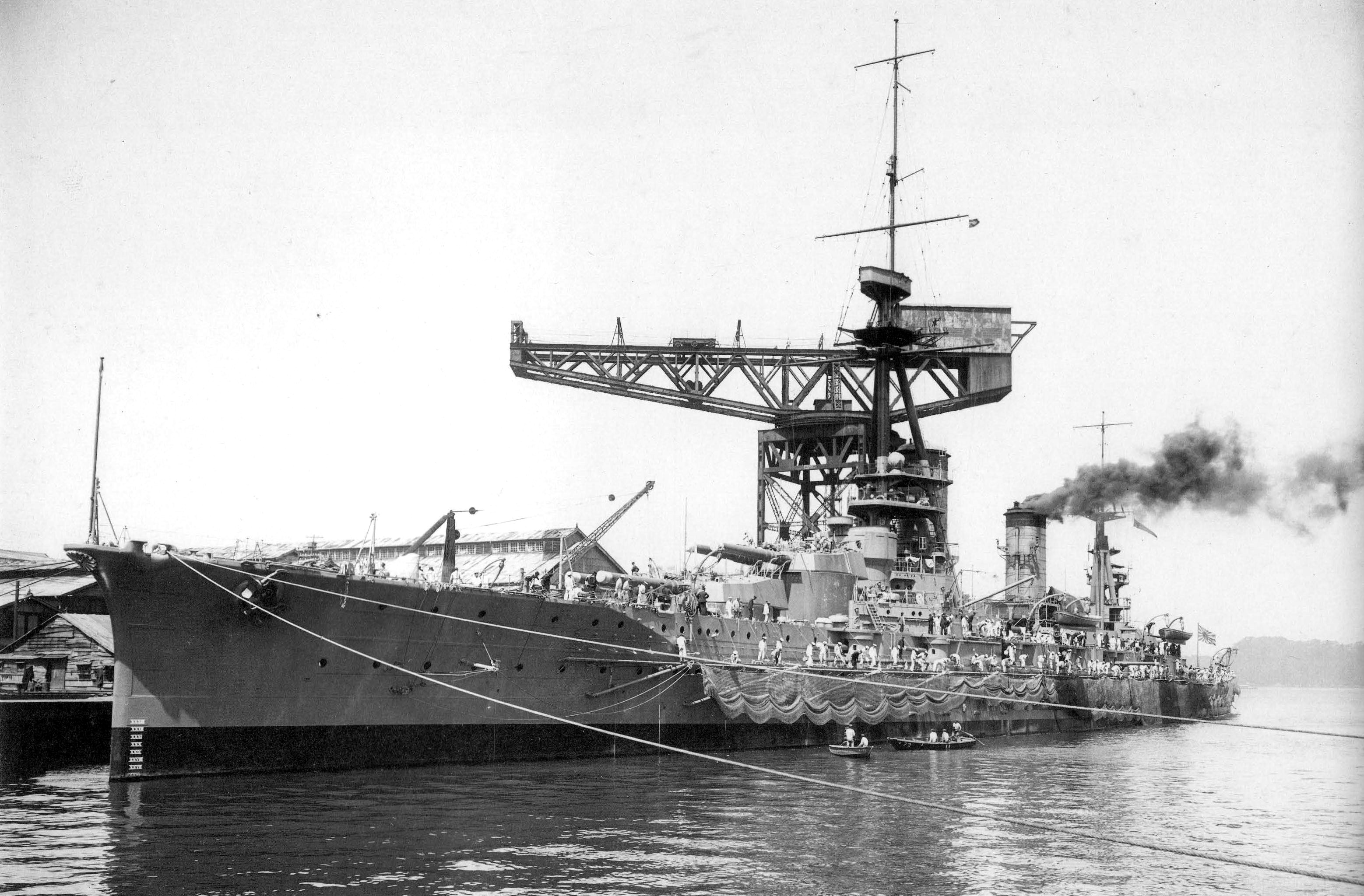
Testing the Japanese battleship Yamashiro's torpedo net at Yokosuka in 1917

The sinking by torpedo of three Allied battleships during the 1915 Dardanelles Campaign, all with torpedo nets deployed, demonstrated that the increased speed of newer torpedoes and the tactic of firing several torpedoes at the same location on the target had made the torpedo net ineffective. Torpedo nets were superseded by the anti-torpedo bulge and torpedo belts.

== Second World War ==
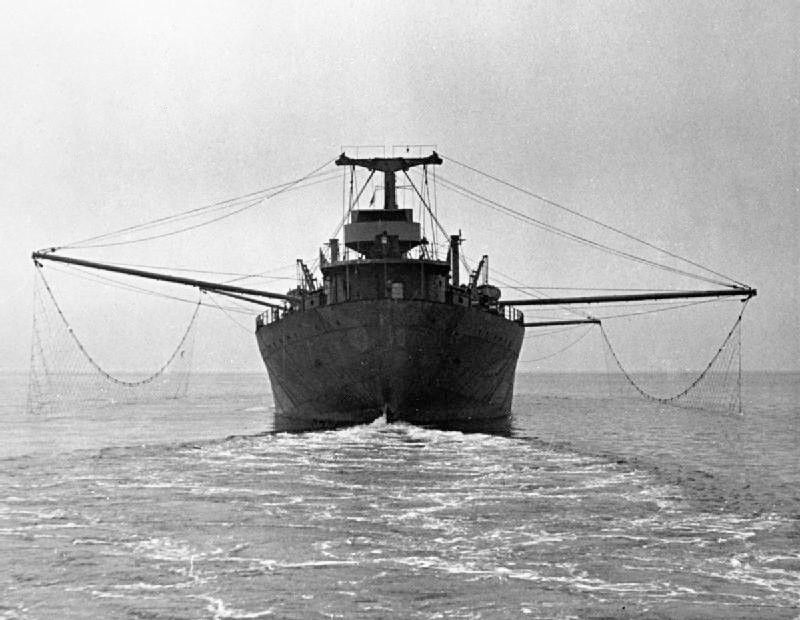
Ship with deployed torpedo nets in the Second World War

Torpedo nets were revived in the Second World War. In January 1940 the UK Admiralty had the ocean liner Arandora Star fitted out with steel booms at Avonmouth and then ordered her to Portsmouth where she spent three months testing nets of various mesh sizes in the English Channel. The net caught all the torpedoes fired at them and reduced the ship's speed by only 1 knot (1.9 km/h; 1.2 mph), but in March 1940 the nets were removed. In July the unprotected Arandora Star was sunk by a torpedo, killing 805 people.

Booms and nets were fitted to a few ships in August 1941 and by the end of the Second World War they had been fitted to 700 ships. The nets did not protect the whole of a ship but protected from 60 to 75 per cent of each side. Twenty-one ships so equipped were subject to torpedo attacks while the nets were deployed. Fifteen ships survived as the nets protected them. The other six were sunk because a torpedo either penetrated a net or hit an unprotected part of a ship.

Nets protected ships at anchor, especially as obstacles against submarines, human torpedoes, and frogmen. They were also used to protect dams and led to the development of bouncing bombs to defeat them, as in Operation Chastise.

== See also ==
- Net cutter (submarine)
- Net cutter (fisheries patrol)
- Net laying ship
- Slat armor

== Sources ==
- Balakin, Sergei (2004). Морские сражения русско-японской войны 1904–1905 [Naval Battles of the Russo-Japanese War] (in Russian). Moscow: Morskaya Kollektsya [Maritime Collection].
- "Taffrail" (Henry Taprell Dorling) (1973). Blue Star Line at War, 1939–45. London: W. Foulsham & Co. pp. 40–41. ISBN 0-572-00849-X.
- Williams, L Norbray (1989). "Ships With Steel Skirts". Warship 1989. London: Conway Maritime Press. pp. 74–96. ISBN 0-87021-999-5.
