= Net cutter (submarine) =

Submarine device used to cut nets

A submarine's net cutter is a device mounted on the bows of some naval submarines to cut through anti-submarine netting. Some net cutters are powered by explosives.

== See also ==
- Torpedo net cutter
- Net cutter (fisheries patrol)
