= Cosme García Sáez =

Spanish inventor

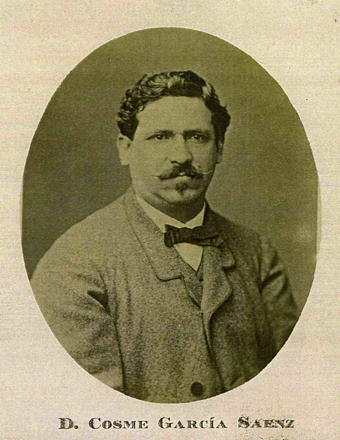
- Born: September 27, 1818. --> Logroño, Kingdom of Spain
- Died: June 23, 1874 (aged 55); Madrid, First Spanish Republic
- Occupation: Inventor
- Known for: Invention of a submersible
- Parent(s): Andrés García and Andrea Saéz

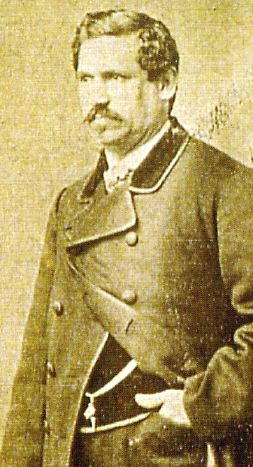

Cosme García Sáez (27 September 1818 in Logroño – 23 June 1874 in Madrid) was a Spanish inventor. He is best known as one of the first Spaniards to develop a submersible, tested in 1860 shortly after Narcís Monturiol's submarine Ictíneo I in 1859 and preceding Monturiol's Ictíneo II in 1865 and Isaac Peral's Peral in 1889. The Spanish Ministry of Defense has recognized García as one of the four "fathers" of the Spanish Navy's Submarine Force.

== Biography ==
=== Early life ===
García was the older son of Andrés García and Andrea Saéz. Little is known about his early life. His father, whose occupation is unknown, died when he was 15 years old, forcing him prematurely into a role as head of his family, supporting his mother and younger brother. At the age of 19, he married Úrsula Parres, the daughter of a tanner, at the Church of Santiago el Real in Logroño on 30 October 1837. Their first child, Vicente Benito, was born on 12 January 1838 and their second child, Juana, on 13 July 1839, with the birth certificates of both children indicating that García's occupation was that of guitar maker. By 1845, the couple had two more sons, Sotero and Enrique. García served in a grenadier company of the National Militia until at least 29 January 1843, never rising above the rank of private. It seems unlikely that he pursued higher education or had any formal training in engineering

García was nicknamed "El Pinche" ("The Kitchen Assistant") in Logroño. After he moved to Madrid he acquired the nickname "García el Riojano" ("García the Riojan") there.

=== Inventions ===
Despite his lack of higher education, García displayed talent as an inventor. His inventions included machines for stamping mail in post offices, improvements in the casting of printing type, and a shotgun and a breech-loading carbine for the Spanish Army. However, he is best known for his invention of a submersible.

==== Shotgun ====
García had developed an interest in firearms during his time in the National Militia, and on 16 May 1856 he filed a patent for a shotgun called the Relámpago (Lightning). It was a multi-shot, rapid-loading shotgun designed to significantly decrease the time required to reload standard infantry and hunting weapons. However, the prototype was prone to frequent backfires and accidental discharges. The Spanish Military Commission rejected it after tests, deeming the shotgun dangerous to its operator.

==== Postal machine ====
On the same day as the shotgun, García filed a patent for a postal machine he invented for use by the Fábrica del Sello (Stamp Factory), Spain's national postage-stamp producer prior to the establishment of the Royal Mint in 1893. His postal machine was a compact device consisting of an iron frame, a plunger, and several rollers that collected and distributed ink from a reservoir onto a bronze platen. This invention was far more successful: Upon operating the machine, several letters were instantaneously postmarked, leaving a remarkably clear and clean stamped impression.

==== Printing ====
In Madrid, García worked as a typesetter, and he eventually became regent of Spain's National Printing Office there. As regent, he devised improvements in the casting of type, and the rector of the Central University of Madrid commissioned him to build a printing press with Greek characters. Also on the day he filed the patents for the shotgun and the postal machine, he filed one for a beltless printing press. It consisted of an ink fountain (or ink reservoir), a cylinder, and several ductor and distributing rollers that spread the ink across the platen where the type form was secured. It used no belts to feed it with paper, simplifying its design and operation, and it was so easy to operate that it required only the strength of a child turning a hand-cranked wheel located on one side of the machine, which always rotated in the same direction. His printing press became the first to print Greek characters in Spain in the 19th century. Its success allowed him to amass savings of 225,000 pesetas.

==== The submersible ====
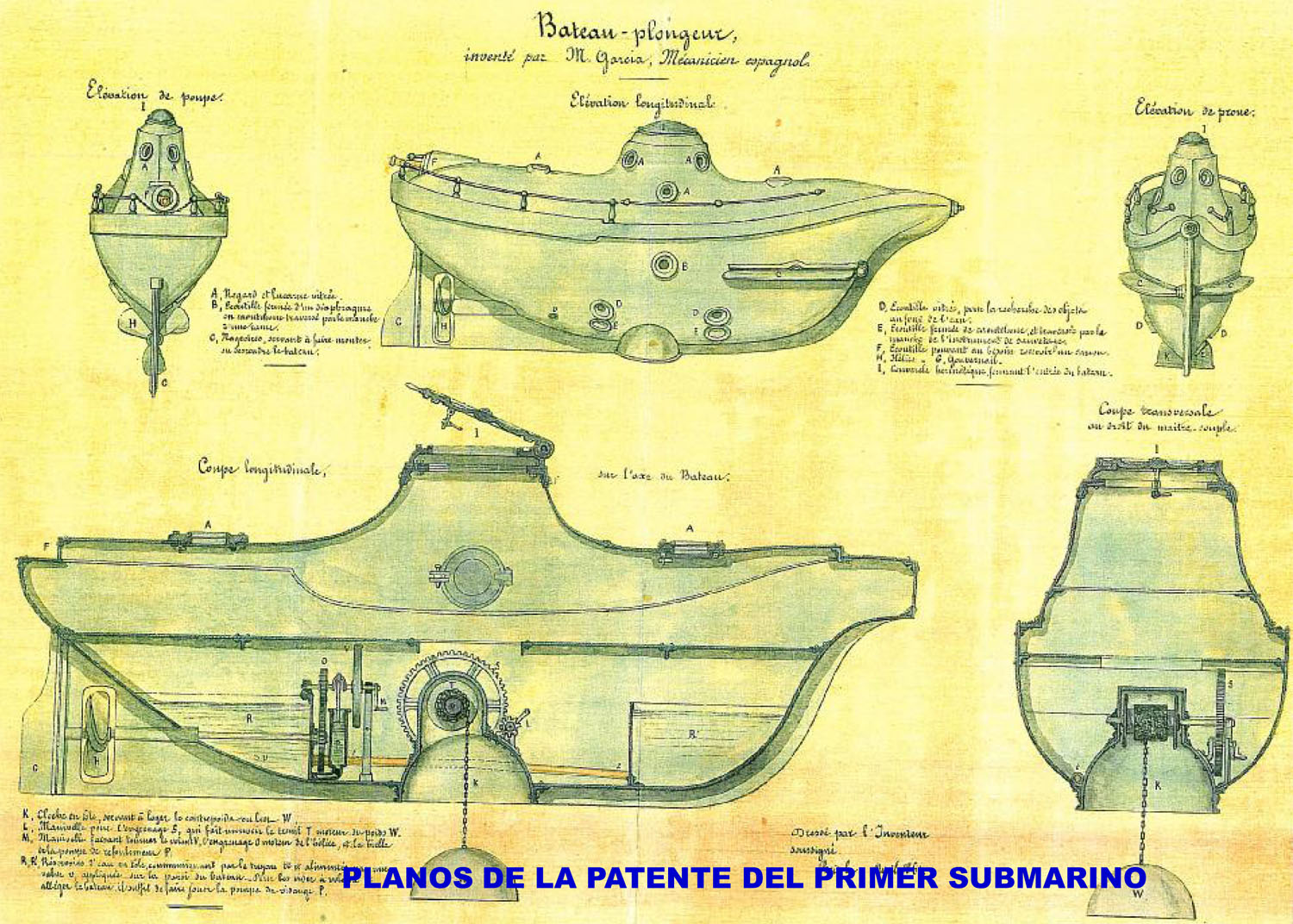
Plans of García's submersible Garcibuzo.

García is best known for the submersible be invented. Funding himself with the money he earned from the printing press, he traveled to Barcelona in 1857 and began work on the submersible. He first designed a prototype manufactured by La Maquinista Terrestre y Marítima (The Land and Marine Machine Works) of Barcelona. Made of sheet iron, it resembled a cylinder and was 3 metres (9 ft 10 in) long, had a beam of 1.5 metres (4 ft 11 in), and was 1.6 metres (5 ft 3 in) in height. He tested it unsuccessfuly in the waters of Catalonia in 1858. He then built a significantly larger second prototype — 5.75 metres (18 ft 10 in) long, 1.75 metres (5 ft 9 in) in beam, and 2.25 metres (7 ft 5 in) in height. Also made of sheet iron, its design included new mechanisms to improve its ability to dive and ascend, as well as bow-mounted rudders and ballast systems that enhanced its maneuverability and stability. It could accommodate two people, who moved the submersible by turning a propeller by hand. García whimsically named it Garcibuzo, a portmanteau of "García" and "buzo," the Spanish word for "diver."

In 1859, García had Garcibuzo transported by ship from Barcelona to Alicante, where he conducted tests of it necessary for it to receive consideration for a patent. The tests were successful, and he applied for a patent for the vehicle in Spain on 9 July 1859, calling it an Aparato-Buzo ("Diving Apparatus"). The patent was granted on 8 May 1860.

García and his son crewed Garcibuzo in a test in the presence of a notary, Spanish Navy personnel of the Alicante Naval Command, and other government authorities on 4 August 1860. García and his son navigated underwater off Alicante for 45 minutes without assistance, diving to the harbor's maximum depth and moving in all directions before resurfacing. According to the official record of the event, the tests were carried out to the great satisfaction of those present, and the event received widespread coverage in Spain's national press.

The success of the tests gave García hope for the success of his submersible. Anticipating the possibility of using it in combat, he made plans to equip future models with a breech-loading cannon that would fire through openings at the bow and stern. He also built an all-copper model of Garcibuzo, which he took to Madrid to present to Queen Isabella II. She summoned him to the Royal Palace, and admired the model, but informed García that the Spanish government could not purchase the submersible or finance its future development due to the expenses incurred during the Hispano-Moroccan War in North Africa.

Cosme García then traveled to Paris, where he believed his work would be better received. In Paris, he applied for a patent for the submersible in France on 16 November 1860, calling it a Bateau Plongeur ("Diving Boat"), and the patent was granted on 25 April 1861. Emperor Napoleon III and his engineers examined the submersible and invited García to move to Toulon to build one, but García declined the offer. He returned to Spain in serious financial difficulty due to the expenses he had incurred in the submersible project and the number of loans he had taken out to finance his inventions.

Garcibuzo remained moored at Alicante until the local port authority declared it a nuisance that was obstructing maritime traffic in the harbor. Lacking the financial resources to move the submersible, García's son Enrique disposed of it by scuttling it in the harbor. It has not been refloated, and harbor authorities assume that it has become buried beneath the harbor bottom.

Twenty-four years after Cosme García's death, Enrique García presented blueprints and patents for the Garcibuzo project to the Spanish government in 1898 during the Spanish-American War, offering to construct a new submersible for use in the conflict. The Spanish government rejected the offer.

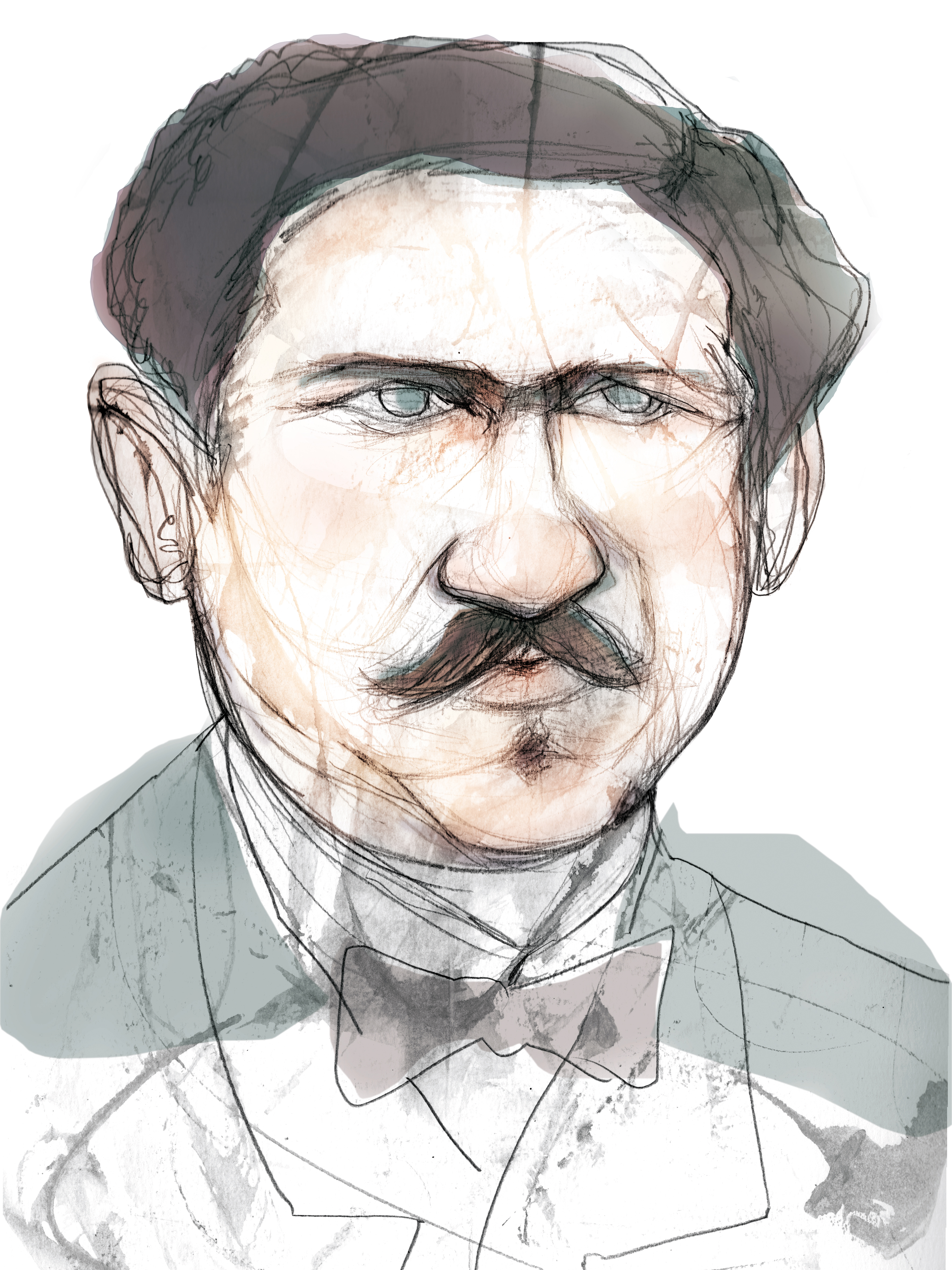
A portrait of Cosme García Sáez by Eulogia Merle, hanging at the Fundación Española para la Ciencia y la Tecnología (Foundation for Science and Technology) in Spain.

==== Carbine ====
In 1862, Cosme García invented a breech-loading carbine for use by the Spanish Army. To operate it, a soldier loaded it by turning a lever to the right, loosening a screw and freeing the cylinder. The soldier then used a button to rotate the cylinder until the chamber was exposed. The soldier then rotated the cylinder back until the axis of the projectile aligned with that of the barrel and closed the cylinder by tightening the screw in the opposite direction of the lever's movement. In this way, the screw advanced in its nut and tightened the cylinder. The Spanish Army testing found that the carbines could fire more than 3,000 rounds without the mechanism failing and without needing cleaning. The army adopted the carbine in 1863 and had 500 of them were manufactured in Oviedo. They equipped two battalions of light infantry.

Encouraged by this success, and hoping to improve his personal finances, García patented the carbine in numerous countrie including Norway, Sweden, and the United Kingdom, and he traveled to the United States and patented it there as well. However, the Spanish Army changed its rifle specifications, and that combined with the onset of the Sexenio Democrático (Six Democratic Years), a period of political turmoil in Spain from 1868 to 1874, meant that no further production of García's carbine took place. The carbines that were produced were stolen during the Glorious Revolution in 1868, at which time most of them disappeared.

=== Later life ===
The end of his carbine in Spanish Army service disillusioned García and ruined him financially. He fell into poverty. His marriage broke up, and he abandoned his wife and children and subsequently lived with the family's housemaid, María Egaña, with whom he had two sons, Juan and Vicente. His financial situation became so precarious that he needed the charity of a powerful patron, José de Salamanca y Mayol, Marquess of Salamanca, to survive. He died in obscurity in Madrid at the age of 55 on 23 June 1874, so mired in poverty that some of his children had to beg in the streets of Madrid.

== Commemoration ==
The Spanish Navy has named three submarines after García:

- The A-class submarine Cosme García (A-2) was in commission from 1917 to 1931.
- The United States Navy transferred the Balao-class submarine USS Bang (SS-385) to Spain in 1972, and she was in commission in the Spanish Navy as Cosme García (S-34) from 1972 to 1980.
- The S-80 Plus-class submarine Cosme García is scheduled to be commissioned in 2028.

In 1985, a secondary school named after García opened in Logroño.

In 1993, a committee in La Rioja — the Spanish autonomous community and province in which Logroño lies — attempted through various activities to bring revive García's legacy and bring him out of obscurity.

In January 2012, the Spanish Ministry of Defense identified García as one of the four "fathers" of the Spanish Navy Submarine Force, after which the first four submarines of the S-80 Plus class would be named. The other "fathers" were Narcís Monturiol, Isaac Peral, and Mateo García de los Reyes.

== See also ==
- Submarine
- History of submarines
