= Maria Jesús Uriz Lespe =

Spanish marine biologist

Maria Jesús (Iosune) Uriz Lespe
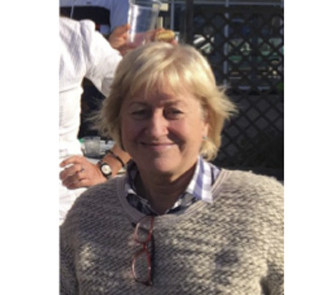
- Born: Iosune Uriz Lespe; 25 December 1949 (age 76); Estrella (Navarra, Spain)
- Awards: Narcís Monturiol Award (2005)
- Scientific career
- Institutions: CEAB-CSIC
- Thesis: "Contribución a la fauna de esponjas (Demospongia) de Catalunya" University of Barcelona, 1978, p. 220. (1978)

María Jesús (Iosune) Uriz Lespe (Estella, Navarra; 25 December 1949) is a pioneer in taxonomy, biology and population genetics of marine sponges, with a wide international recognition. In recent years she has focused her research on evolutionary and functional aspects of the symbiotic relationships between sponges and microorganisms, interacting with the renowned American specialist Lynn Margulis. Her line of research in the biological activities of sponge secondary metabolites gave rise to a continued collaboration with pharmaceutical companies that have allowed the development of antitumor drugs.

== Biography ==
She graduated at the University of Navarra in 1972. Later, in 1978, she received her doctorate Cum Laude in biology from the University of Barcelona. Thanks to a postdoctoral fellowship from the Spanish Ministry of Education and Science, in 1973 she arrived at the Institute of Fisheries Research in Blane s. Later, in 1985, she joined the Center for Advanced Studies in Blanes (CEAB-CSIC). She was vice-director at CEAB between 1985 and 1994, and director from 1994 to 1998.

She was one of the first researchers in Spain to use the autonomous diving suit. Her research has been developed mainly in the Mediterranean and Antarctica where she has described more than 30 new species. She is currently an emeritus research professor at the Center for Advanced Studies of Blanes (CEAB-CSIC), belonging to the Spanish National Research Council.

== Research ==
She has directed more than 15 doctoral theses and is the author of more than 150 articles published in indexed journals. She has directed more than 30 national and international projects. She is editor of the magazines Scientia Marina (2004–present) and Scientific Reports (2017–present). She is also an evaluator of scientific projects for the following organizations: CYCIT, CIRIT, BBVA, Smithsonian Institution of Washington, National Science Foundation of the USA and of the European Union. She is Member of the Academic Commission of the Biodiversity Doctorate Program and the Marine Sciences Doctorate Program of the University of Barcelona and member of the Commission for the Evaluation of Collaborators and Lecturers of the University of Barcelona and Gerona (AQU).

== Awards and honors ==
In 2005, she obtained the "Narcís Monturiol" award for Scientific and Technical Merit for her scientific career, awarded by the Generalitat of Catalonia.

== Highlighted publications ==
- M Maldonado, MC Carmona, MJ Uriz, A Cruzado (1999). Decline in Mesozoic reef-building sponges explained by silicon limitation. Nature 401 (6755), 785-788[1]
- MJ Uriz, X Turon, MA Becerro, G Agell (2003). Siliceous spicules and skeleton frameworks in sponges: origin, diversity, ultrastructural patterns, and biological functions. Microscopy research and technique 62 (4), 279-299[2]
- MA Becerro, NI Lopez, X Turon, MJ Uriz (1994). Antimicrobial activity and surface bacterial film in marine sponges. Journal of Experimental Marine Biology and Ecology 179 (2), 195-205[3]
- A Blanquer, MJ Uriz (2011). “Living together apart”: the hidden genetic diversity of sponge populations. Molecular biology and evolution 28 (9), 2435-2438
- E Cebrian, MJ Uriz, J Garrabou, E Ballesteros (2011). Sponge mass mortalities in a warming Mediterranean Sea: are cyanobacteria-harboring species worse off?. PLoS One 6 (6)[4]
- MJ Uriz (2006). Mineral skeletogenesis in sponges. Canadian Journal of Zoology 84 (2), 322-356[5]
- MA Becerro, RW Thacker, X Turon, MJ Uriz, VJ Paul (2003). Biogeography of sponge chemical ecology: comparisons of tropical and temperate defenses.Oecologia 135 (1), 91-101[6]
- M Maldonado, MJ Uriz (1999). Sexual propagation by sponge fragments. Nature 398 (6727), 476-476[7]
- M Turon, MJ Uriz, D Martin (2019). Multipartner Symbiosis across Biological Domains: Looking at the Eukaryotic Associations from a Microbial Perspective MSystems 4 (4), e00148-19
