= Cartagena Naval Museum =

Museum in Cartagena, Spain

- Museo Naval de Cartagena
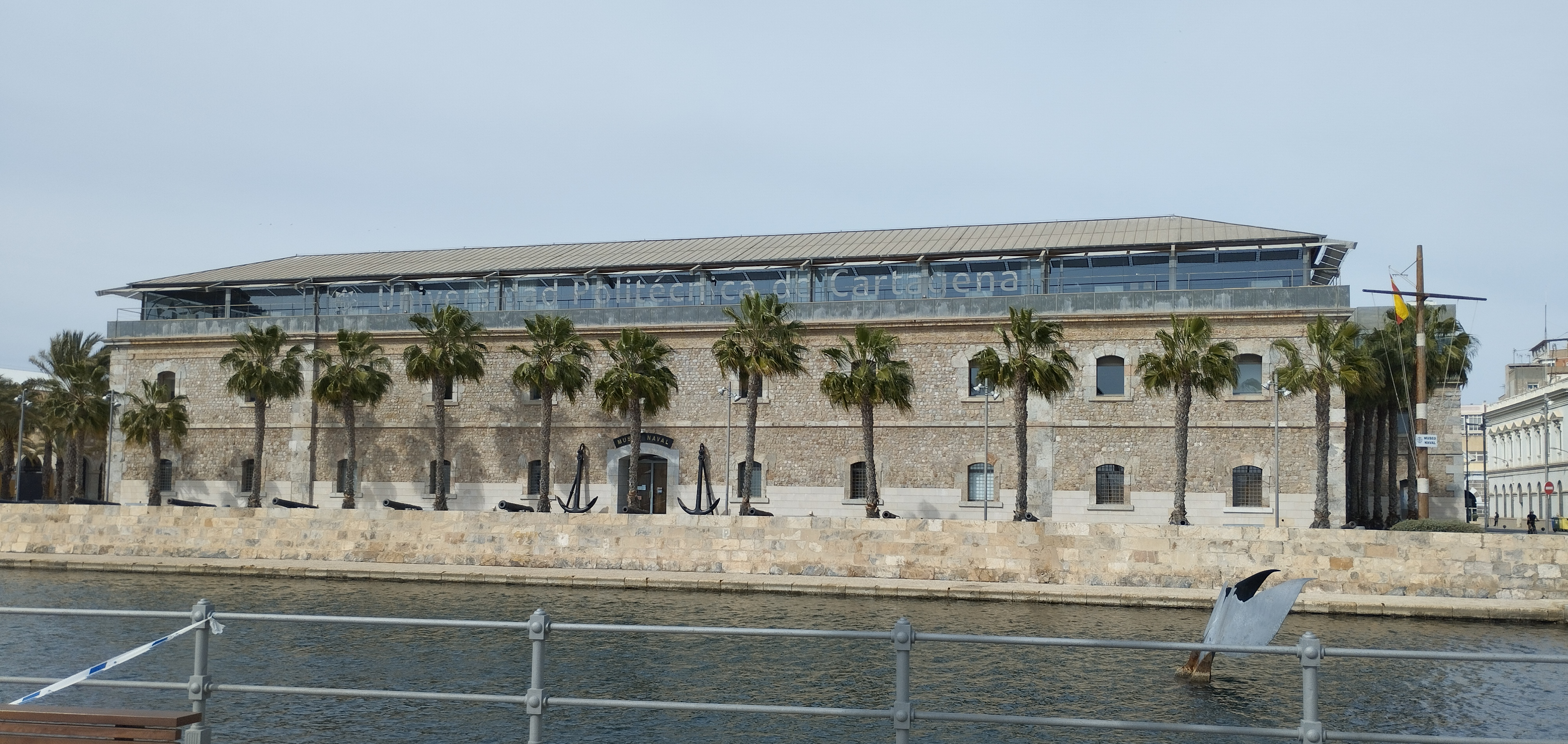
- Cartagena Naval Museum
- Established: July 1986
- Location: Cartagena, Spain
- Coordinates: 37°35′52″N 0°59′14″W
- Director: CN Jorge Madrid

The Cartagena Naval Museum is a military museum near the city port of Cartagena, Spain. It presents exhibitions related to naval construction. It is a subsidiary of the Naval Museum of Madrid.

== History ==
The Naval Museum of Cartagena was opened on July 8, 1986. The original building was built under the direction of the architect Lorenzo Ros in 1926. Originally the building was used by the School of Apprentices of the Spanish Society of Naval Construction. They changed its name in 1947 to National Company Bazán. Later it became the school Our Lady of the Rosary. Later the Navy reclaimed the building and converted it to the naval museum. Captain Luis Delgado Bañón was director until January 8, 2011, when he retired. The current director is the captain of ship Jorge Madrid.

The museum has been moved to a new headquarters in the city's seafront, in the former Maritime Instruction Headquarters, a historical building from the mid-eighteenth century that was constructed by the military engineer Mateo Vodopich. The building is in front of the Botes Basin. Since its construction in 1786, it has been the State Penitentiary Center (1824), Presidio (1910), and after the Spanish Civil War Barracks for the Instruction of Sailors. Following the agreement signed in 2005 by the Ministry of Defense, the Autonomous Community of the Region of Murcia and the Polytechnic University of Cartagena, the use of the building is shared between the university and naval museum. The space dedicated to the museum is in the southern half of the ground floor of the building.

== Exhibits ==
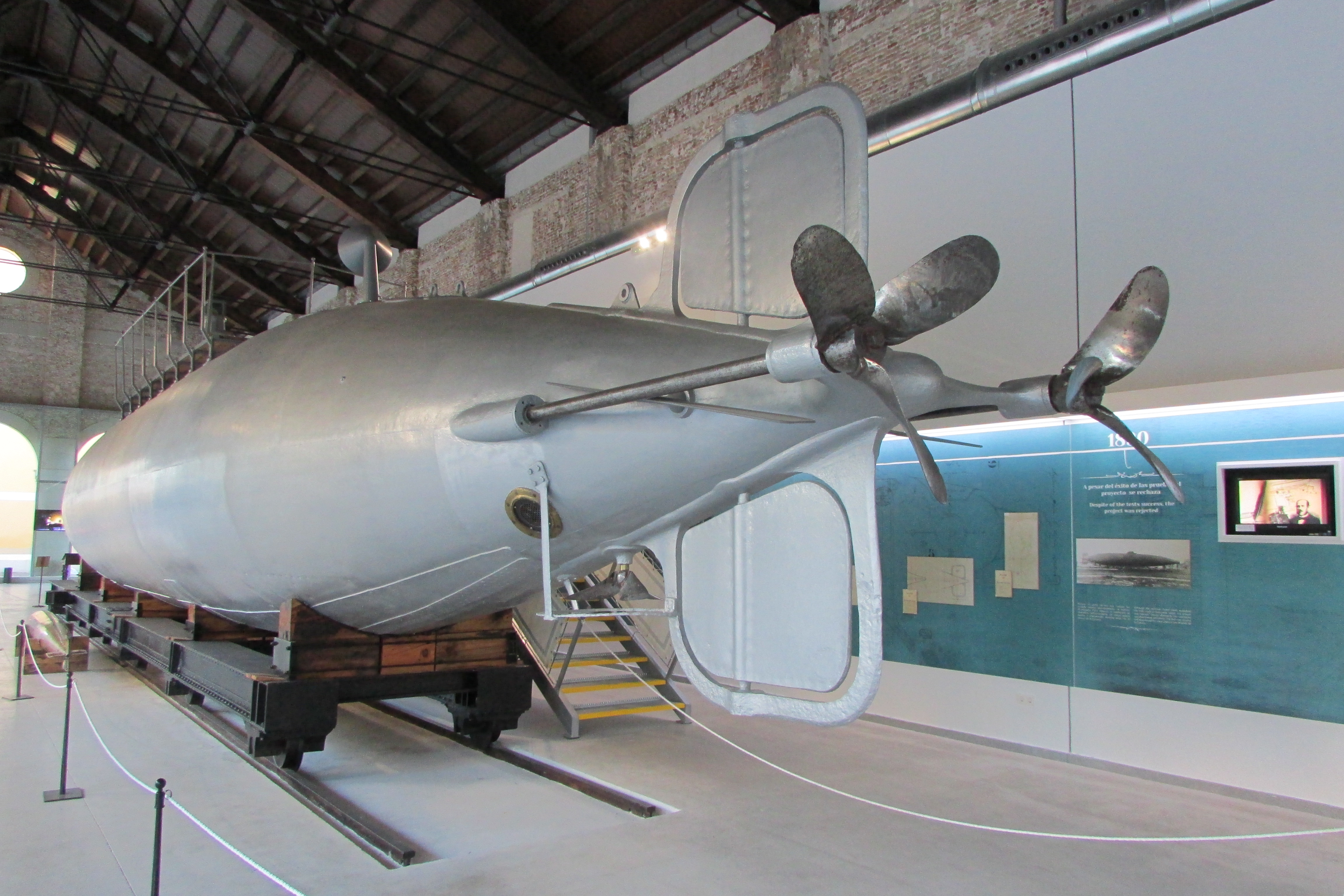
The Peral Submarine

The collection extends between its halls, the lobby and the corridors:

Lobby: The model of the ship Juan Sebastián de Elcano, and the image of the Virgin of the Carmen which can be highlighted, are two emblems of the Spanish Navy, as well as varied objects.

Halls: Contains exhibits of ammunition and masks used in the first half of the century.

Arsenal Room: This room exhibits planes, carpentry tools and a riverside smithy, workshops of rigging and candles, maneuvering elements and models of sailing ships, relics from the ships Nuestra Señora de Atocha and Santa Margarita, and historic documents.

Isaac Peral: Room dedicated to Isaac Peral, which shows flat documents and personal objects that are part of the National Heritage, as well as model paintings of the submarine and a portrait of Isaac Peral.

Marine Infantry Room: Contains collected tables that show the actions and battles in which the marine infantry actions throughout Spanish history. There are also photographs of the marines and a section dedicated to their bands, weapons and uniforms.

Cartography and Navigation Room: Copies of manuscripts of maps, letters and objects such as a rudder of a nineteenth-century war steamer, telegraphs, sextants, navigation publications, a collection of logs, and two ships.

The Navy Diving Room: Reviews the history of diving in the Navy, and displays various objects on this subject and its evolution.

19th Century: Shows the agitation that occurred in nineteenth century Cartagena, dealing with political issues, military campaigns to Cuba, and remains of the bombing suffered in Cartagena in 1873.

Submarine room: Exhibits models of almost all the submarines that participated in the navy, objects such as: batteries, submarine planes, recovery bells, rescue, torpedoes of the Spanish submarine SPS Narciso Monturiol.

History of the submarine weapon: Exhibits objects that show the development of the Spanish submarine fleet: torpedoes, propellers, pictures, crockery, cutlery, periscopes, rudders.

Armament room: This room displays the armament of the Navy, including weapons, ammunition and ammunition.

Hall flags and uniforms: Flags are displayed that are linked to the former Maritime Zone of the Mediterranean, as well as uniforms and models of ships

Naval Health Room: Various objects of the old hospital of nuns: a Sacred Heart, portraits of doctors, heroes of war, ancient documentation, ordinances of the College of Surgery, uniforms of the eighteenth century, models.

== Notable objects ==
- Original Peral Submarine created by Isaac Peral.
- Copy of a Catalan Atlas of 1450.
- Copy of the Letter of Christopher Columbus of 1492.
- Bullet of the bombing on Cartagena in 1873.
- Torpedoes of World War II .
- Chamber of Officers of the submarine S-35 Narciso Monturiol.
- Italian torpedo from 1920 used by submarines.
