= Ictineu 3 =

Crewed submersible

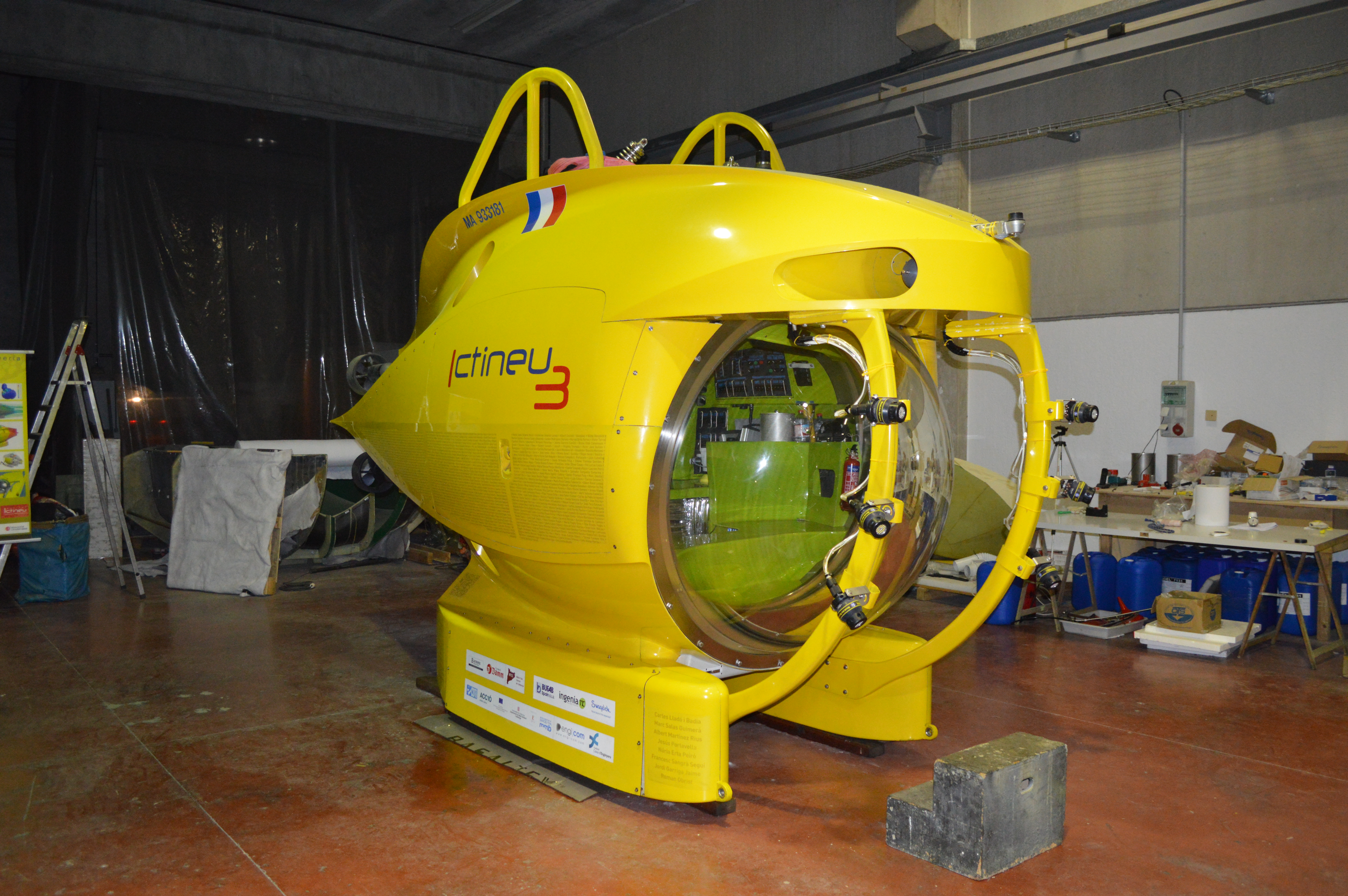
- The Ictineu 3 scientific submarine in its warehouse in Sant Feliu de Llobregat, Catalonia, Spain.

History

France
- Name: Ictineu 3
- In service: 2013

General characteristics
- Type: Deep-submergence vehicle
- Tonnage: 5.3 tons
- Length: 4.8 m (16 ft)
- Beam: 1.9 m (6.2 ft)
- Draft: 2.81 m (9.2 ft)
- Installed power: 4 × 70 Ah 120 V Li-ion batteries
- Propulsion: 4 × 2.7 kW electric thrusters
- Speed: 1.5 kn - 4.5 kn
- Range: 18 km
- Test depth: 1,200 m (3,900 ft)
- Complement: 3

Ictineu 3 is a crewed submersible capable of reaching depths of 1,200 m (3,900 ft), which makes it the ninth deepest submersible, owned by Ictineu submarins SL. Commissioned in 2013, the submersible can carry one pilot and two passengers for 10 hours using all the equipment.

The small weight and dimensions of the submarine (4.8 × 1.9 × 3 m) allow the Ictineu 3 to be carried with a conventional truck without requiring special transportation. The main body is made of inox steel and, at the front, there is a large semi-spheric acrylic glass viewport of 1,200 mm diameter that provides a wide field of view. There are four brushless DC motors for propulsion and four more for manoeuvring, powered by li-ion batteries located outside the submersible for safety.

Its applications range from submarine archaeology to industrial work, and it is specially designed to be easy to adapt to new technology and equipment, having additional ports for wires, sensors and tools. It can also be equipped with a couple of robotic arms with seven degrees of freedom to interact with the external environment.

Ictineu 3 was finished in 2013 after 10 years of development and a 3 M€ budget acquired from crowdfunding, public subsidies and private investors. The name Ictineu 3 pays tribute to the submarines Ictineo I and Ictineo II, developed by the Catalan submarine pioneer Narcís Monturiol during the 19th century.

== Project ==
The project was originally pitched by the Associació Institut Centre Català de Recerca Submarina and registered in February 2006. The submersible was designed and built by Ictineu Submarins S.L. under the direction of engineers Pere Fornès and Carme Paradera. The construction began in a workshop provided by the Maritime Museum of Barcelona but was later moved to dedicated facilities acquired by the company in Sant Feliu de Llobregat. Germanischer Lloyd SE provided the necessary certification upon completion.

The whole project was widely promoted and relied on crowdfunding in order to reach the necessary goals. The starting petition was for €60,000 and the money was collected via Verkami.

== See also ==
- Aluminaut – First aluminum-hulled submarine
- Archimède – French Navy bathyscaphe
- Mir (submersible) – Self-propelled deep submergence vehicle
- Nautile – Crewed submersible owned by Ifremer
