= Narciso Méndez Bringa =

Spanish painter

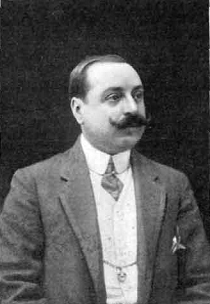
Portrait of Méndez Bringa, 1910, La Ilustración Artística.

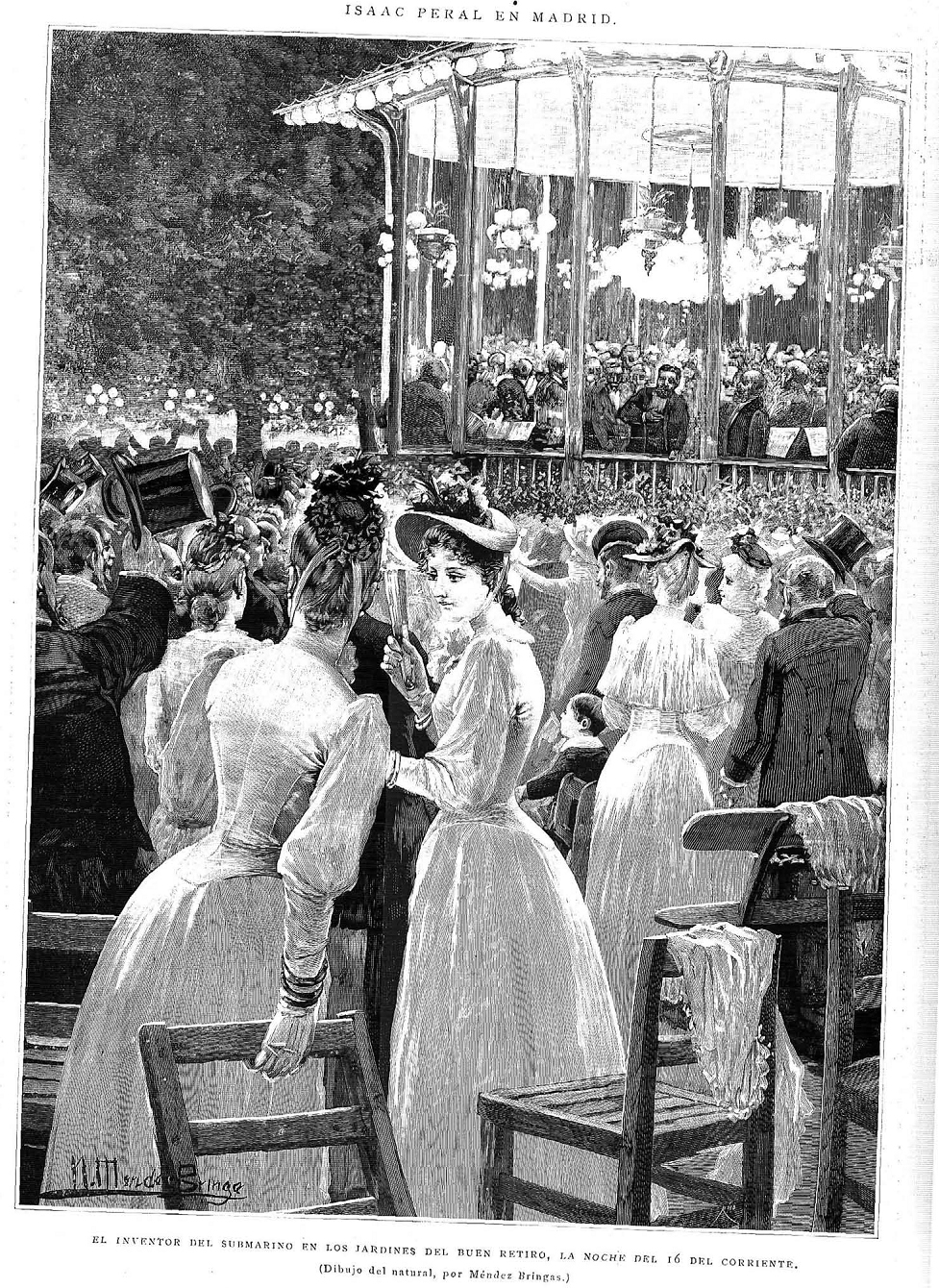
Buen Retiro's gardens, 16 July 1890, reception to Isaac Peral, published in La Ilustración Española y Americana, 1890.

Narciso Méndez Bringa (Madrid, 1868 - Madrid, 5 July 1933) was one of the most important Spanish illustrators. His illustrations won two awards in 1906 and 1910 from the National Exhibition of Fine Arts (Spain).

According to García Padrino, " Narciso Méndez Bringa represented the validity of the Nineteenth Century's concept of illustrating texts. Literary or not, his illustrations were vigorous and fully detailed in setting and characterization, with images destined to be printed by xylography". Bringa was also described as "a member of a conservative group of costumbrist artists rooted in the nineteenth-century" and as "an artist he was anchored in a modernist-toned past".

Narciso Méndez Bringa collaborated in numerous magazines including The Ocurrencias, La Ilustración, The Graphic, El Arte Moderno, Caras y Caretas, La Ilustración Española y Americana, Apuntes, La Ilustración Artística, ABC and Blanco y Negro, in which he was "a constant illustrator of every sort of stories". Bringa was buried in La Almudena Cemetery in Madrid, Spain.

== Bibliography ==
- Zarza, Victor (2015). Narciso Méndez Bringa: el espectáculo de la ilustración (in Spanish). Colección ABC, Museo ABC. ISBN 9788494358302.
- ABC (6 July 1933). "De la muerte del ilustre artista Narciso Méndez Bringa". ABC (in Spanish): 27.
- Almazán Tomás, V. David (1998). "El japonismo en la obra gráfica del ilustrador Joaquín Xaudaró (1872-1933". In Carlos Cid Priego (ed.). Arte e identidades culturales: actas del XII Congreso Nacional del Comité Español de Historia del Arte: 28, 29, 30 de septiembre y 1 de octubre, Oviedo 1998 (in Spanish). Universidad de Oviedo. ISBN 9788483170830.
- Blanco y Negro (7 May 1966). "Méndez Bringa, el ilustrador por esencia". Blanco y Negro (in Spanish): 92–93.
- García Padrino, Jaime (2004). Formas y colores: la ilustración infantil en España (in Spanish). Universidad de Castilla La Mancha. ISBN 9788484272984.
- La Ilustración Artística (5 December 1910). "El notable dibujante Narciso Méndez Bringa". La Ilustración Artística (in Spanish). 1 (510). article by "P.": 5.
- Pijoán, José; Carrete Parrondo, Juan; Fontbona, Francisco; Bozal, Valeriano; Vega González, Jesusa (1988). Summa Artis: Historia General del Arte. El grabado en España, volumen 32 (in Spanish). Espasa-Calpe. ISBN 9788423952748.
- Urdiales, Alberto (2008). "Huellas de tinta: el mejor realista para los niños. Narciso Méndez Bringa (1868-1933)" (PDF). Educación y biblioteca (in Spanish). 20 (166): 18–21. ISSN 0214-7491.
