= Spanish submarine Narcíso Monturiol =

Narcíso Monturiol may refer to one of the following submarines of the Spanish Navy named after submarine pioneer Narcís Monturiol, using the Castillean Spanish translation of his Catalan given name:

- Spanish submarine Narcíso Monturiol (A-1), Spanish A-class submarine (Italian F class)
- Spanish submarine Narcíso Monturiol (S33), the former American Balao-class submarine USS Picuda (SS-382); acquired by the Spanish Navy in 1972; laid up with mechanical defects in 1975; struck from the Spanish Navy in 1977
- Spanish submarine Narcíso Monturiol (S35), the former American Balao-class submarine USS Jallao (SS-368); acquired by the Spanish Navy in 1974; decommissioned in 1984 and scuttled off Cartagena in 1985
- Spanish submarine Narcíso Monturiol (S82), S-80-class submarine under construction in Cartagena
