= Spanish submarine Peral =

First battery-powered naval submarine (1888)

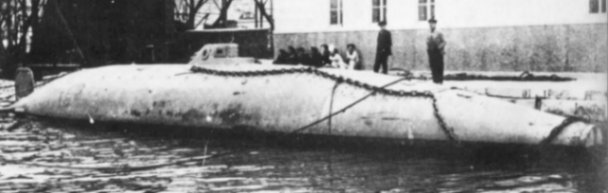
- Peral in 1888

History

Spain
- Name: Peral
- Builder: Isaac Peral In Arsenal de la Carraca (Navantia now)
- Laid down: 7 October 1887
- Commissioned: 1889
- Decommissioned: 1890
- Status: Museum ship since 2013

General characteristics
- Class & type: Submarine
- Displacement: surfaced 77 tonnes; submerged 85 tonnes
- Length: 22 m (72 ft 2 in)
- Beam: 2.9 m (9 ft 6 in)
- Draught: 2.8 m (9 ft 2 in)
- Propulsion: 2 x electric motors, 2 x 30 hp (22 kW), two shaft
- Speed: Surfaced: 7.8 knots (14.4 km/h; 9.0 mph); Submerged: 3 knots (5.6 km/h; 3.5 mph)
- Range: Surfaced: 400 nmi (740 km; 460 mi) at 3 knots
- Armament: one 14 in (360 mm) torpedo tube (bow; three Schwarzkopf torpedoes)

Peral was the first successful submarine powered entirely by electric batteries and the first fully capable military submarine in history. It was built by the Spanish engineer and sailor Isaac Peral for the Spanish Navy at the Arsenal de la Carraca (now Navantia), near Cádiz in Andalusia. The submarine was launched on 8 September 1888.

She had one torpedo tube (and three torpedoes) and an air regeneration system. Her hull shape, propeller, periscope, torpedo launcher and cruciform external controls anticipated later designs. Her underwater speed was 3 knots (5.6 km/h; 3.5 mph). With fully charged batteries, she was the fastest submarine yet built.

The Peral was the most advanced submarine of its time, but it lacked a means of recharging its batteries while underway, as was done in the later diesel-electric submarines, thus severely limiting her range. This made her useful only for geographically limited operations, like protecting critical ports from blockades or operating in restricted waterways like straits to deny ship access. In June 1890, the Peral submarine successfully launched a torpedo while submerged. It was also the first submarine to incorporate a fully reliable underwater navigation system. Despite successfully completing two years of tests, conservatives in the Spanish naval hierarchy terminated the project, which included plans to build an improved larger version. Her operational abilities have led some to call her the first U-boat.

Peral was withdrawn from service in 1890 and is now preserved at the Cartagena Naval Museum.

== Conception ==
Profile of the Peral.

Peral was first conceived on 20 September 1884, when Lieutenant Isaac Peral y Caballero wrote a paper which would become his Proyecto de Torpedero Submarino ("Project for a submarine torpedo boat").

After several studies and experiments, and having gained support from his superiors and fellow officers, Peral exposed his idea to the Spanish navy staff. He wrote a letter to the Spanish naval minister, Vice Admiral Pezuela y Lobo, in September, 1885. Pezuela called Peral to Madrid to have a personal interview with him. After the interview Pezuela agreed to finance Peral's preliminary studies in Cádiz with an initial budget of 5,000 pesetas, before launching a program to build a full-scale submarine.

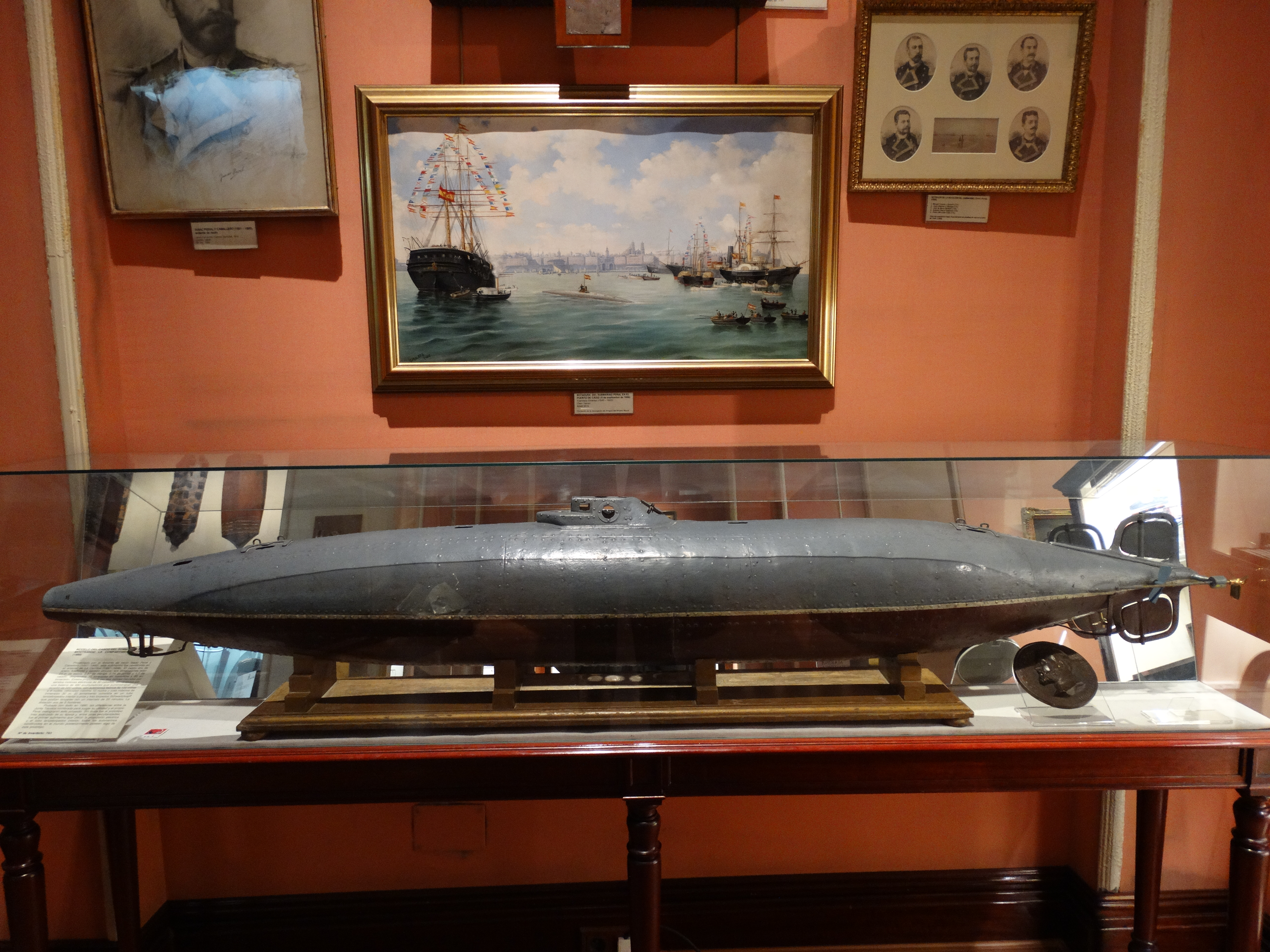
Model of Peral in the Naval Museum of Madrid.

The first study consisted of human breath test in an enclosure for several hours. A room of 58 m^{2} (620 ft^{2}) square meters was used, with an air storage cell, loaded to 79 atmospheres and a storage capacity of 0.5 m^{3}. In addition to instruments to measure the temperature and moisture, there was a tube to re-oxygenate the air supply to the crew through a 4 mm (0.16 in) waterproof cloak and three water buckets to maintain air moisture. Six people locked themselves inside the room; one had to leave an hour and quarter later, but the rest remained for a total of five hours, and the test was considered a total success.

On 21 July 1886, the new Navy Minister, rear-admiral Beranger, decided that the project would be reviewed by the Centro Técnico de la Armada (Naval Technical Center), under the responsibility of Admiral Antequera. He considered a more complete study of the actuator necessary before undertaking the construction of the hull and the electrically powered engine. He authorized Peral to carry out all the modifications that he thought worthwhile, granting him 25,000 pesetas.

On 5 March 1887, Peral communicated that the secret "depth device" control was ready. On 17 March, the Commander in Chief of Cadiz, Florencio Montojo, who headed the technical committee overseeing the machine, requested budgeting for Peral's submarine.

=== Construction ===
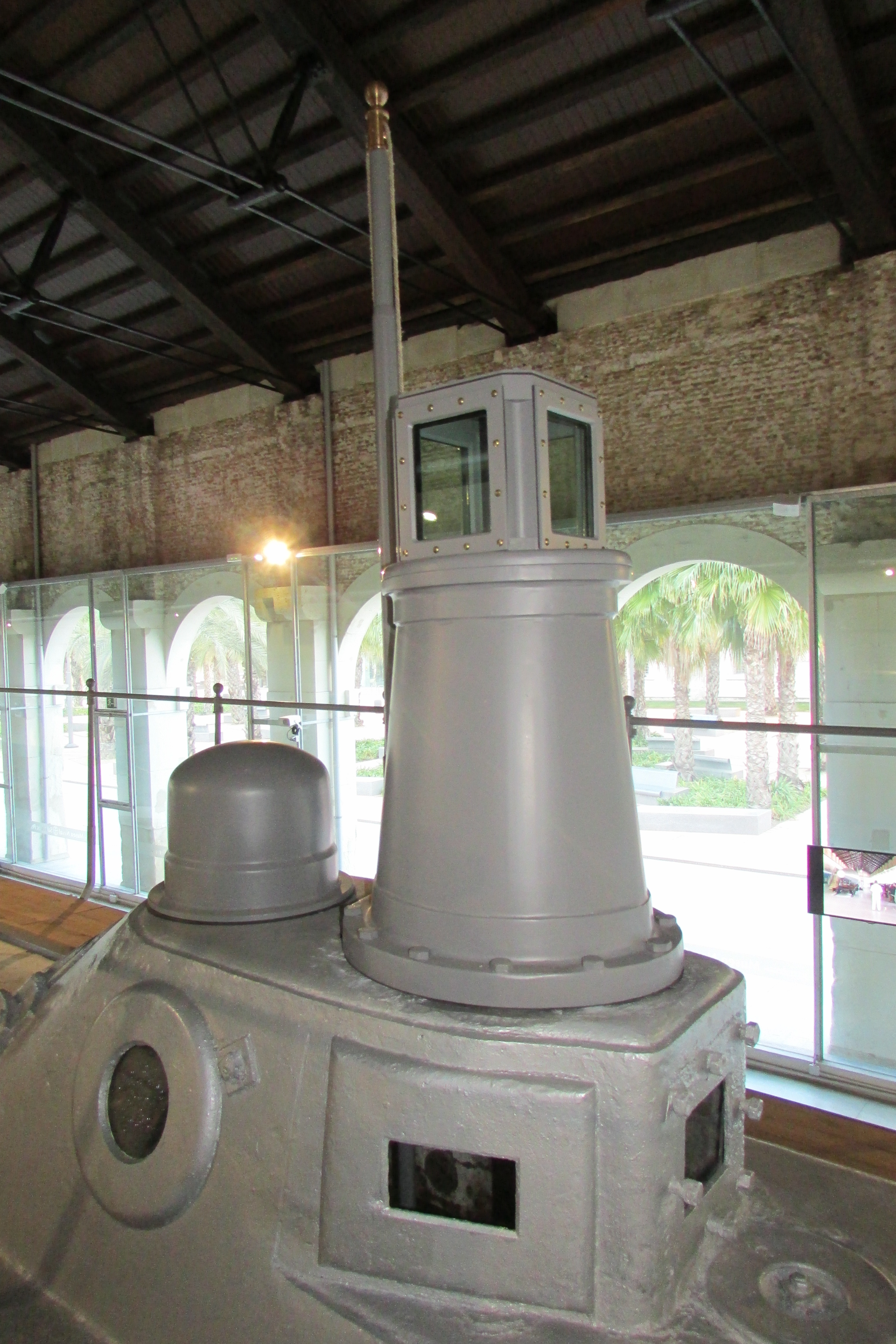
Turret detail

On 25 April 1887, the submarine's construction was finally approved by the government; the keel was laid down on La Carraca on 7 October, although work did not start until two weeks later. Nevertheless, the submarine had already undergone a number of modifications: Peral's original 1885 model conceived of a 61-ton submarine, 18.8 m (62 ft) long, with a beam of 2.52 m (8.3 ft) and a single 40 shp (30 kW) electric motor for a single shaft. The submarine Peral began in 1887 had a length of more than 22 m (72 ft), a beam of 2.87 m (9.4 ft), a draft of 2.76 m (9.1 ft), two 30 shp (22 kW) electric motors geared to twin screws, and a displacement of 77 tons surfaced and 85 submerged.

Air regeneration in the interior of the submarine was accomplished by an auxiliary 6 hp (4 kW) engine, which passed the air through a sodium hydroxide purifier to eliminate CO_{2} exhaled by the crew. In addition, the pump injected oxygen when needed. The same engine which circulated air also drove the bailing pump.

The submarine's dive and depth was controlled through a "depth device". This enabled precise stability and depth control to be maintained by automatic adjustments to the ballast tanks and two small, vertically mounted propellers powered by 4 hp (3 kW) electrical motors at both ends of the hull. The ballast tanks had a water storage capacity of 8 tonnes, which was filled with water or pumped with air to reduce or increase buoyancy. In order to navigate, Peral used a bronze magnetic needle installed in the ceiling of the turret to avoid electrical interference. He also devised a periscope; a fixed tube on the turret that guided exterior light onto a reflecting table via a series of prisms.

The engine-cooling system consisted of forcing compressed air stored in the submarine over the engines, and though the original project had needed 430 accumulators, the final project installed 613 with a weight of 50 kg (110 lb). The total weight of the batteries was around 30 tonnes.

The top speed varied with the charge of the batteries. With one-quarter charge, the submarine was able to reach 4.7 kn (8.7 km/h; 5.4 mph), one-half 6.9 kn (12.8 km/h; 7.9 mph), three-quarters 8.9 kn (16.5 km/h; 10.2 mph), knots, completely charged 10.9 kn (20.2 km/h; 12.5 mph). The range of the boat again depended on battery charge level; Peral calculated his original submarine could reach 132 nmi (152 mi; 244 km) at a speed of 6 kn (11 km/h; 6.9 mph). With no means of charging batteries while underway, such as an internal combustion engine, endurance and range were limited.

One of the original features of Peral was an underwater lamp, which enabled the crew to search the sea bottom. The searchlight had a range of 150 m (490 ft).

The submarine was single-hulled, and the ballast tanks were located at the bottom of the hull, underneath the torpedo tube. This single torpedo tube was the only weapon in the submarine, with two watertight doors on each end so the submarine could launch a torpedo submerged. Mechanisms used for reloading were simple and fast, and the submarine had three reserves. This was almost identical to the torpedo launchers used in submarines since then. In order to avoid expenses, the torpedoes Peral launched during the trials were borrowed from torpedo boats, two from Retamosa and one from Barceló.

=== Trials ===
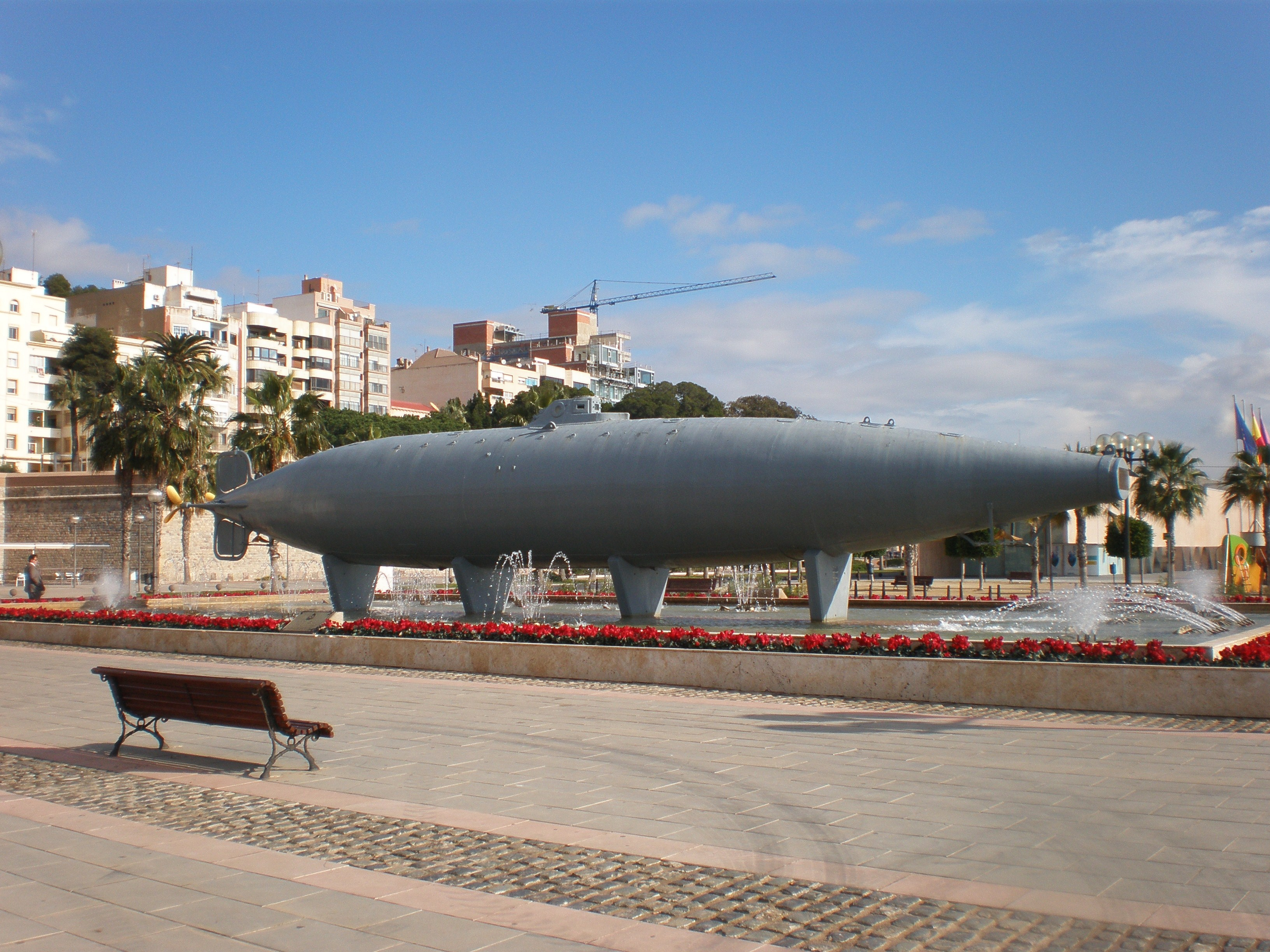
The submarine Peral in 2009 in front of the port of Cartagena.

Peral was launched on 8 September 1888, sixteen days before another pioneering electric submarine, the French Gymnote. On 6 March 1889 Peral's trials started, consisting of handling and surface navigation. On 7 August 1889, the submarine submerged for the first time up to the turret; 18 days later fired the first trial torpedo (without warhead); on 5 December submerged to 7.5 meters (25 ft); on 25 December passed the first non-static dive test, operating at a steady depth of 9.5 meters (31 ft); and, in 1890 operated underwater for one hour, reaching a maximum depth of 30 meters (98 ft) in trials.

On 25 June 1890 Peral made two simulated attacks on the cruiser Cristóbal Colón, one during daylight and other at night. At the daylight trial the submarine was unable to attack the cruiser, as the optical turret was spotted less than 1,000 yards (910 m) away from the cruiser, which had 200 civilian and military guests who obviously expected to see the submarine, a fact that angered Isaac Peral. The simulated night attack was successful. The staff that evaluated the trials of the submarine submitted a report, considering its speed and range insufficient, and being especially critical about the failure of the submarine during the daylight attack and its electric motors. However, overall the report was positive, and a second submarine was ordered, again under the direction of Isaac Peral but also managed by several naval departments. Peral designed a 30-meter (98 ft) submarine of 130 tons, under the condition that he would choose the yard where the submarine would be built and the team to build it. The authorities, who considered this a refusal by Peral to build the submarine, did not accept these conditions. Finally, they ordered Peral to return the submarine to the La Carraca yard where it was built. On 11 November 1890 a decree set the end of the projects of underwater navigation in the Spanish Navy.

Similar figures of performance were only attained about a decade later in other countries. The speed and endurance of the Peral attained World War I standards (in terms of underwater, battery-powered sailing).

=== Preservation ===
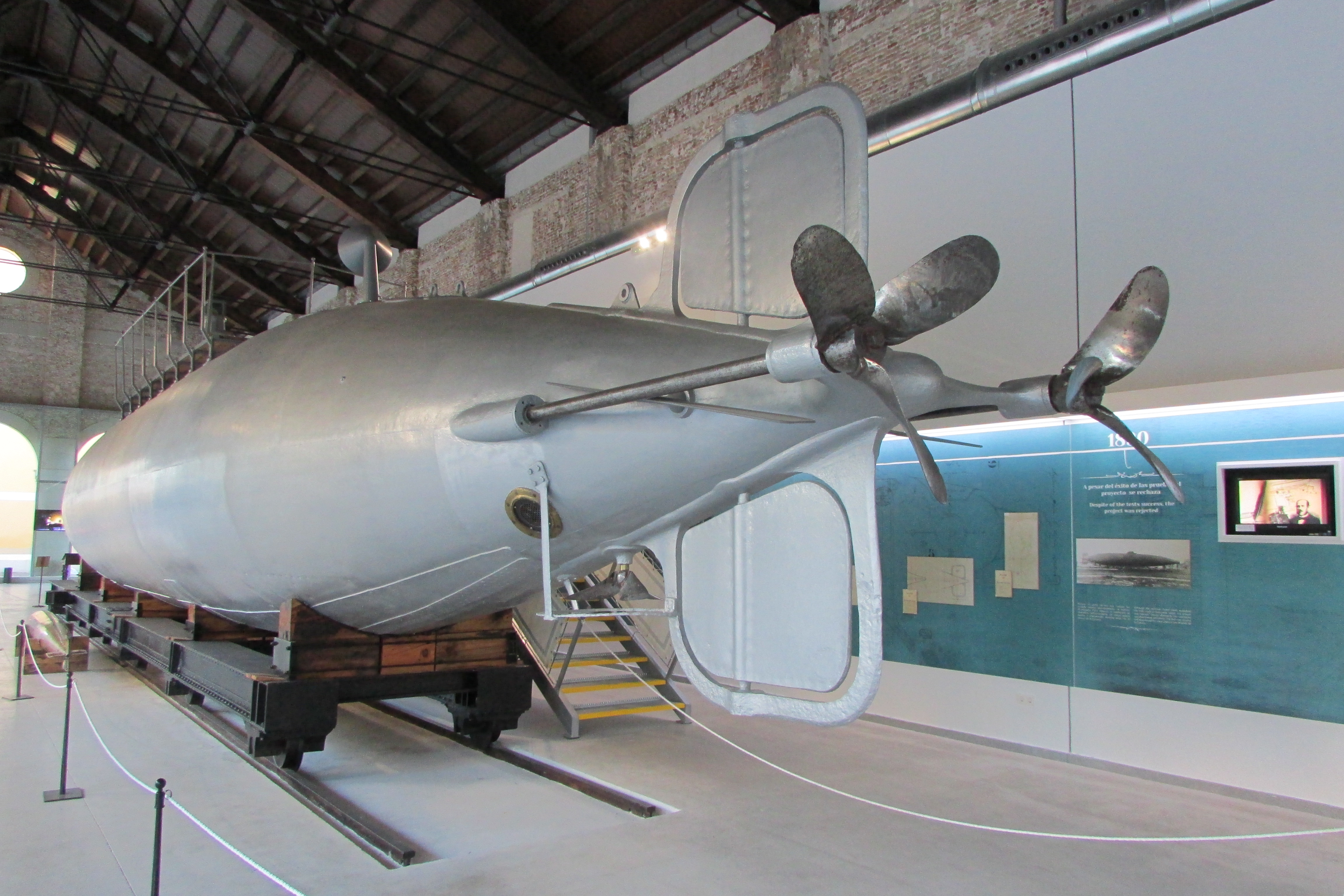
The submarine Peral in 2015 in the new Naval Museum of Cartagena.

In 1890 Peral was withdrawn from service, equipment removed, and the hull stored at La Carraca Arsenal. In 1913 her demolition was ordered but was not carried out.

In 1929, the Minister of the Navy, Contralmirante (Counter Admiral) Mateo García de los Reyes, who was the first commander of the Spanish submarine force, ordered the hull reclaimed and towed it to Cartagena, where it was put ashore at the submarine base.

In 1965 the authorities of Cartagena succeeded in moving the hull to the Plaza de los Héroes de Cavite.

In 2002 it was moved to the Paseo Alfonso XII, in front of the port of Cartagena.

In 2013, Peral was restored and moved to the Cartagena Naval Museum.

== See also ==
- History of submarines
- List of submarines of the Spanish Navy
- List of retired Spanish Navy ships
- Ictíneo I
- Ictíneo II
