= Ictíneo I =

Pioneering submarine constructed in Barcelona, Spain in 1858–1859

Coordinates: 41.3759°N 2.1755°E

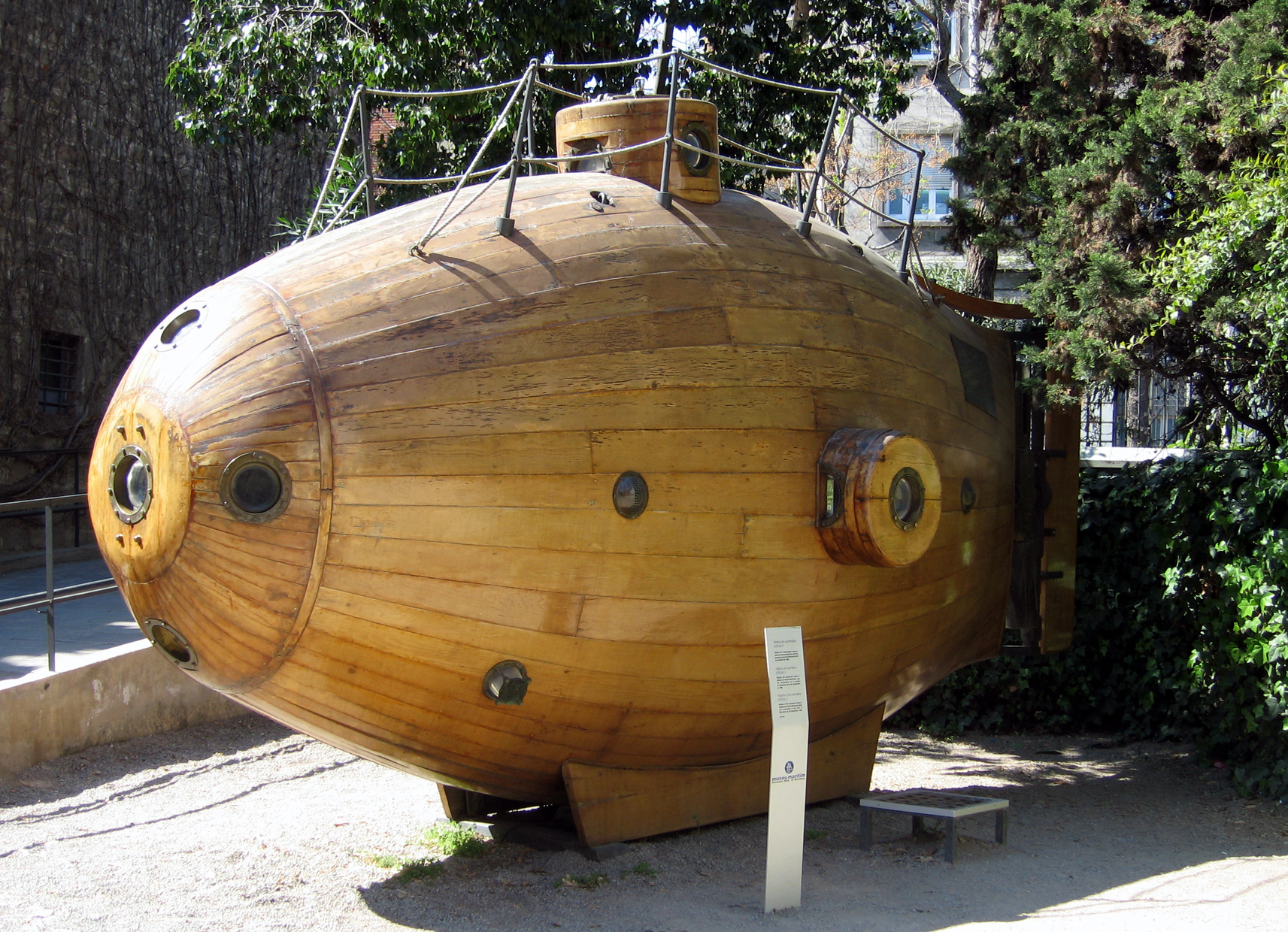
- Ictíneo I replica

Class overview
- Name: Ictíneo I
- Builders: Narcís Monturiol; financed by the people of Spain
- Operators: Narcís Monturiol
- Succeeded by: Ictíneo II
- In service: 28 June 1859 to January 1862
- Completed: 1
- Lost: 1

General characteristics
- Class & type: Submarine
- Tonnage: 10 t (9.8 long tons; 11 short tons)
- Length: 7 m (23 ft) (outer hull); 4 m (13 ft) (pressure hull)
- Beam: 1 m (3 ft 3 in) (pressure hull)
- Height: 2.5 m (8 ft) (outer hull); 2 m (7 ft) (pressure hull)
- Installed power: Human muscle
- Propulsion: Hand crank propellers
- Endurance: 2 hours (submerged)
- Test depth: 50 m (160 ft)

Ictíneo I was a pioneering submarine designed by the engineer and inventor Narcís Monturiol and launched on 28 June 1859 in Barcelona, Catalonia, Spain. Conceived to improve the safety of coral harvesters, it was among the earliest submarines designed for practical civilian use rather than military purposes.

The vessel incorporated several innovative features, including a double-hull arrangement, ballast tanks, trim-control systems, and a chemical method of removing carbon dioxide from the air inside the vessel. Between 1859 and 1862, Ictíneo I completed numerous successful dives before being accidentally destroyed in January 1862 while moored in Barcelona harbor.

== History ==
While living in the coastal town of Cadaqués, Monturiol became concerned by the dangers faced by coral harvester working along the Catalan coast. According to Monturiol's later accounts, witnessing a diver's death led him to consider the possibility of a ship capable of operating safely beneath the sea surface. He kept his ideas to himself for over 12 years, concerned that he might be ridiculed and also because he did not have the funds to build such a vessel. A friend convinced him that his idea must be brought to life, and that sufficient funds could be found from friends and the general public.

By the mid-1850s he had developed a detailed concept for a submarine intended to assist underwater workers. Monturiol named his vessel Ictíneo, from the ancient Greek ἰχθύς, ichtys, 'fish' and νᾱῦς, nāûs, 'ship', reflecting Monturiol's intention to create a vessel capable of moving through water in a manner analogous to a fish.

In September 1857 he returned to Barcelona and established Monturiol, Font, Altadill y Cia., the first commercial enterprise in Spain dedicated to submarine navigation, with an initial capital of 10,000 pesetas. The following year he published Proyecto de navegación submarina. El Ictíneo ó Barcopez (The Ictíneo or fish-ship), outlining the principles behind the proposed vessel. According to Monturiol's account, the Ictíneo’s "form is that of a fish, and like a fish it has its motor in the tail, fins to control its direction, and swimming bladders and ballast to maintain an equilibrium with the water from the moment it submerges".

Monturiol was a leading member of the Catalan Cabetian movement, a current of utopian socialism inspired by the French thinker Étienne Cabet. His conception of the Ictíneo reflected these humanitarian ideals, emphasizing scientific progress and the protection of underwater workers rather than military applications.

== Description ==
Monturiol realized that the ideal shape for a submarine from the point of view of hydrodynamics and steerage was that of a fish. However, the optimum shape for a hull to withstand water pressure was a sphere. He therefore combined the two, with an inner, ellipsoidal pressure hull and an outer, streamlined, fish-shaped hull, inventing what is now called a light hull, with a space between the two hulls which was open to the sea and free-flooding.

Monturiol had originally wanted to build his pressure hull out of metal in the interests of strength but he and his financial backers lacked sufficient funds, so he instead settled for wood, with which he was familiar since his father was a cooper. The pressure hull was constructed from olive wood, supported with oak rings, and covered in 2 mm of copper, and measured 4 metres (13 ft) long, 2 metres (6.6 ft) at its highest, and 1 metre (3.3 ft) wide. Monturiol calculated that it should be able to maintain its integrity to a depth of 500 metres (1,600 ft), although he only rated it to 50 metres (160 ft) for the sake of safety. The outer streamlined hull was 7 metres (23 ft) long, 2.5 metres (8.2 ft) high, and displaced 10 tonnes. Several thick glass ports were installed on the sides, top, and bow of the Ictíneo; these were semi-conical in shape so that water pressure would tend to force them more firmly into their seats, helping in avoiding leaks.

Four ballast tanks (or bladders, as he called them) were installed in the free-flooding area between the submarine's two hulls, two located forward and two towards the rear, all controlled from inside the pressure hull using valves to admit water and pumps to force in air. An emergency system was fitted to ensure that the submarine could surface even if the ballast tank system failed, consisting of two sets of large weights fitted to the exterior which could be jettisoned to give the vessel positive buoyancy. Monturiol also included a large weight mounted inside the submarine on a longitudinal metal track, which could be moved back and forth to counteract shifts in the vessel's centre of gravity.

For propulsion, Monturiol used hand-cranked propellers. He invented a chemical air scrubber to remove carbon dioxide from the interior by forcing the air through a container of calcium hydroxide, thus allowing the vessel to remain underwater for longer periods. He also devised a method of producing oxygen which unfortunately proved impractical because it also produced sulfuric acid as a byproduct. For interior illumination he used a candle, which had the advantage of turning red when oxygen was beginning to run low, which would alert the crew.

== Operational history ==
On 28 June 1859, Monturiol was ready for the Ictíneo's first voyage and the submarine was launched into Barcelona harbour. During its initial trials it sustained damage after striking submerged obstacles, requiring repairs before further testing could continue. Monturiol estimated that the repairs would exhaust his funds and performed some hasty repairs on the damaged portholes, exterior hull, and ballast tanks, and limited his diving depth to 20 metres (66 ft).

During the summer of 1859, Monturiol performed more than 20 test dives in the Ictíneo, with his business partner and shipbuilder as crew. He gradually increased the depth he dived to until he reached his 20 metres (66 ft) limit and learned that the crew could remain dived for about two hours using only the oxygen sealed inside the pressure hull, and that their endurance could be doubled using compressed oxygen and his carbon dioxide scrubber. Throughout 1859 and the following years, the submarine reportedly completed approximately fifty dives and achieved submerged endurance of around two hours.

The Ictíneo's performance confirmed the practicality of many of Monturiol's engineering concepts, although its top speed was disappointing. The limitations of human-powered propulsion prompted him to seek improved methods for future submarines.

Ictíneo I was eventually destroyed in January 1862 after some 50 dives, when a cargo vessel ran into it while it was berthed.

== Legacy ==
The experience gained during the design, construction and testing of Ictíneo I directly contributed to the development of the larger and more advanced Ictíneo II.

A few years after Monturiol's death, the Spanish submarine Peral underwent its first sea trials in September 1889. The event renewed public interest in Monturiol's earlier achievements, particularly in Catalonia, where his memory remained strong. Numerous articles appeared in newspapers and periodicals comparing the two submarine projects, and Monturiol's Ensayo sobre el arte de navegar por debajo del agua was subsequently published.

Monturiol's pioneering work occupies an important place in the history of submarine development and Spanish engineering. A full-scale replica of Ictíneo I is displayed at the Barcelona Maritime Museum.

== See also ==
- Ictineu 3
- Media related to Ictineo I (submarine, 1859) at Wikimedia Commons
