= Ictíneo II =

Pioneering Spanish submarine (1865–67)

Coordinates: 41.3796°N 2.1834°E

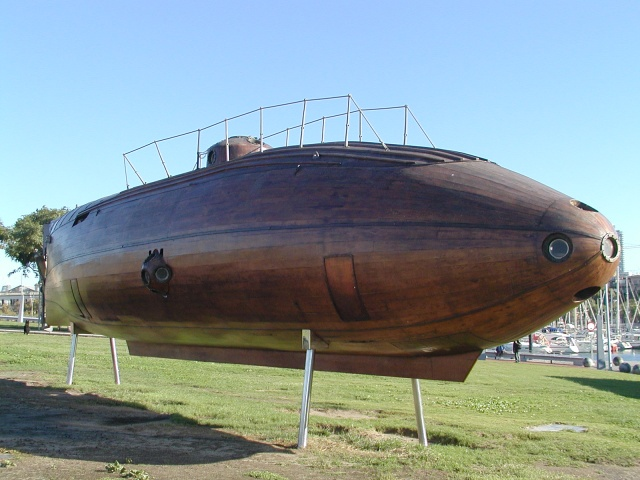
- Ictíneo II replica at the harbour of Barcelona

Class overview
- Name: Ictíneo II
- Builders: La Navegación Submarina,
- Operators: Narciso Monturiol
- Preceded by: Ictíneo I
- In service: 20 May 1865 to Dec 1867
- Completed: 1
- Retired: 1

General characteristics
- Class & type: Submarine
- Displacement: 46 t (45 long tons; 51 short tons)
- Length: 14 m (45 ft 11 in) (light hull)
- Beam: 2 m (6 ft 7 in) (light hull)
- Height: 3 m (9 ft 10 in) (light hull)
- Installed power: Air independent steam engine submerged; coal powered steam engine surfaced
- Propulsion: Screw propeller
- Speed: 4.5 knots surfaced
- Endurance: Tested to 7 hours submerged
- Test depth: 30 m (98 ft)

Ictíneo II was a pioneering 19th century submarine. It was launched in the Port of Barcelona on October 2, 1864 by the self-taught Spanish engineer Narcis Monturiol. It was the first air independent and combustion-powered submarine, and the first submarine to overcome the basic problems of machine powered underwater navigation.

== History ==
The Ictíneo II was originally intended as an improved version of the handpowered Ictíneo I. The Spanish Navy pledged support to Monturiol but did not actually supply it, so he had to raise funds himself, writing a letter to the nation to encourage a popular subscription which raised 300,000 pesetas from citizens across Spain and was used to form the company La Navegación Submarina to develop the Ictíneo II.

The Ictíneo II made her maiden voyage under human power on 20 May 1865, submerging to 27.5 metres (90 ft). After reading about the American Civil War and the attempts at submarine construction such as the CSS Hunley, the financially desperate Monturiol wrote to the United States Secretary of the Navy; however, the Civil War had ended by the time the Secretary responded.

Dissatisfied with the limitations placed on him by human propulsion, Monturiol realized that the only option was steam power, but contemporary steam engines required a fire which was not an option for a submerged submarine. To this end he invented an air independent engine, which ran on a chemical reaction fueled by peroxide that provided its own oxygen for combustion.

Monturiol intended to develop the submarine for its commercial use in the exploitation of coral reefs. Later he installed a gun inside the submarine's hull and performed a number of trials involving underwater shots on predetermined targets from 22 December to 30 December 1865, but this failed to impress the military authorities.

Monturiol envisaged a new vessel, custom built to house his new engine, which would be entirely built of metal with the engine housed in its own separate compartment. However, due to the state of his finances, construction of a new vessel was out of the question, and instead he managed to raise enough funds to fit the engine into the Ictíneo II.

On 22 October 1867 the Ictíneo II made its first surface journey under steam power, averaging 3.5 knots (6.5 km/h) with a top speed of 4.5 knots (8.3 km/h). Two months later, on 14 December, Monturiol submerged the vessel and ran his chemical engine, but with a quite slow speed of 2.5 knots (4.6 km/h). The submarine could dive up to 27.5 metres (90 ft) and could stay underwater for seven and a half hours.

On 23 December, La Navegación Submarina went bankrupt, having completely exhausted its funds. Monturiol had spent 100,000 duros – which could have purchased several frigates, or 160 kilograms (350 lb) of gold – and could attract no more investment. The chief creditor called in his debt, and Monturiol was forced to surrender the Ictíneo II, which was his sole asset. The creditor subsequently sold it on to a businessman, and the authorities, who taxed all ships, issued its new owner with a tax bill. Rather than pay, he dismantled the entire submarine and sold it for scrap. The ship's surface motor was removed to a textile factory; the viewports ended up as bathroom windows.

== Description ==
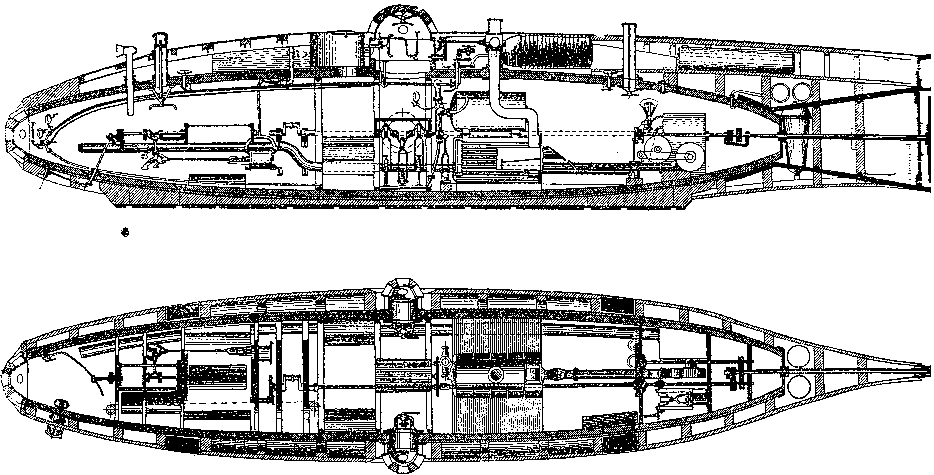
Plan of Ictíneo II

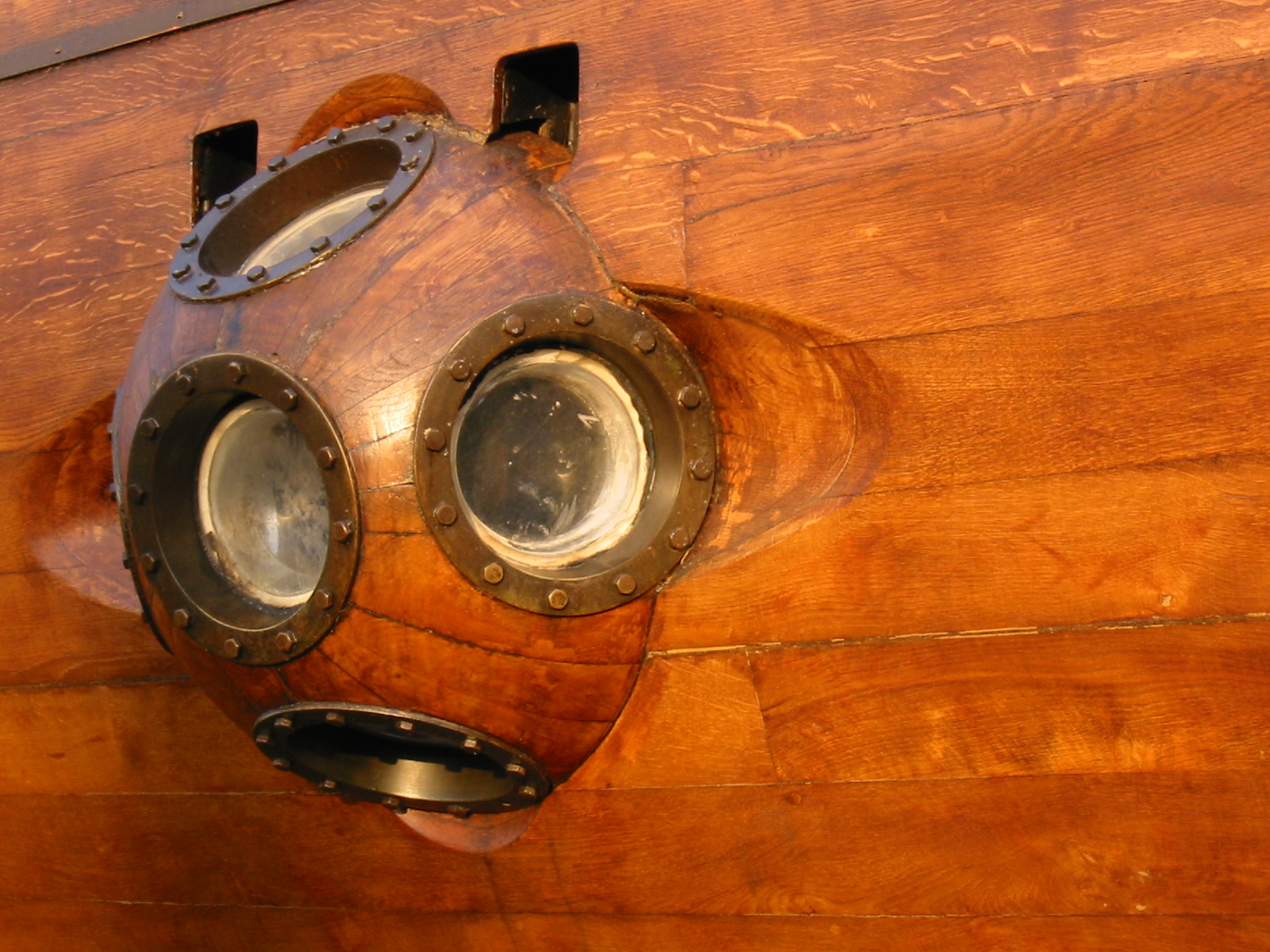
Detail of Ictíneo II replica in Barcelona harbour.

The Ictíneo II was 14 metres (46 ft) long, 2 metres (6.6 ft) wide, and 3 metres (9.8 ft) high. Her displacement was 46 tonnes and her interior volume was 29 cubic metres (1,000 cu ft). She was built of olive wood with oak reinforcements, and a 2 mm thick layer of copper. Her upper side had a deck 1.3 metres (4.3 ft) wide and a hatch with three glazed portholes 200 mm (7.9 in) in diameter and 100 mm (3.9 in) thick glass blocks. The submarine could be steered from the conning tower by means of an endless screw gear.

Four ballast tanks of 8 cubic metres (280 cu ft) capacity were located symmetrically on each side in the free flooding areas between the streamlined outer light hull and the inner pressure hull. The ballast tanks would be flooded at will to submerge and surfacing was achieved by forcing air into them with a pump. Pitch during diving was controlled by a weight which could be moved longitudinally along a rail, remotely controlled by the helmsman. The submarine also had an emergency mechanism intended to jettison the ballast to allow it to surface quickly.

The most important innovation in the Ictíneo II was its air independent propulsion for underwater navigation. A reaction of zinc, manganese dioxide and potassium chlorate heated the boiler of a steam engine to produce steam that was used to power the steam engine and excess oxygen released by the reaction was used for illumination. Monturiol purchased a six-cylinder steam engine and divided it in half; one half was powered by a coal-burning boiler for surface propulsion while the other half was powered by a separate boiler heated by his chemical mixture.

== See also ==
- Ictineu 3
- V-80 submarine
