= Isaac Peral =

Spanish engineer and naval officer

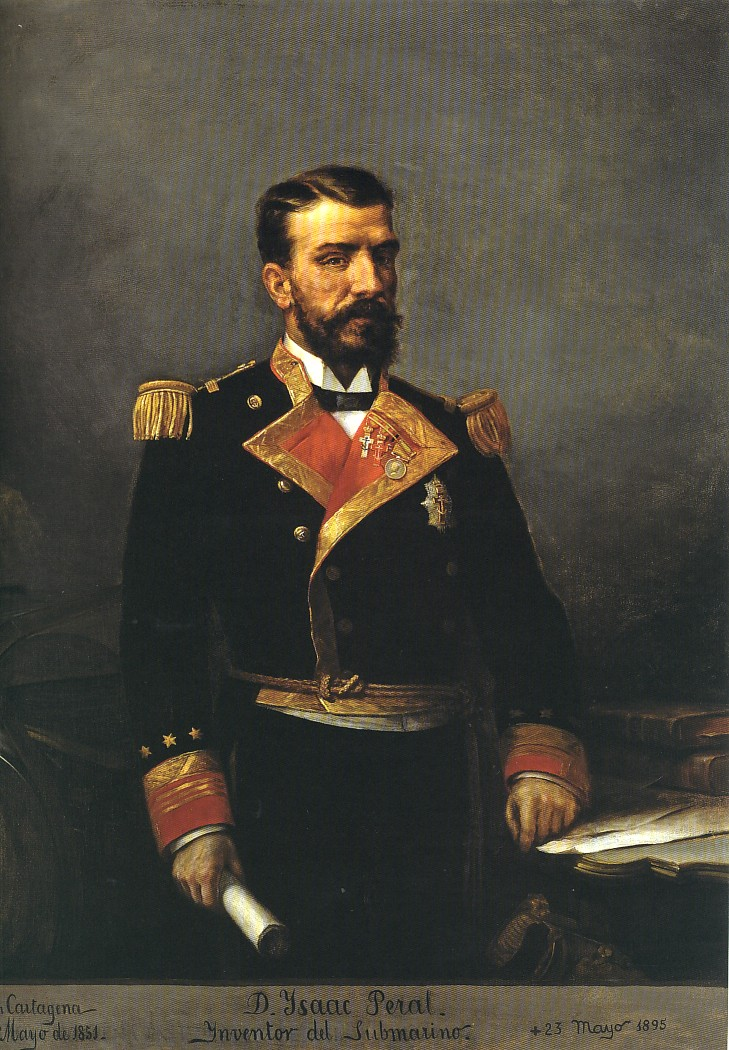
Isaac Peral

Isaac Peral y Caballero (1 June 1851, in Cartagena – 22 May 1895, in Berlin), was a Spanish engineer, naval officer, and designer of the submarine Peral. He joined the Spanish Navy in 1866, and developed the first electric-powered submarine which was launched in 1888. It was not accepted by political authorities, but it was accepted by the navy. He then left the navy to develop other inventions commercially.

== Early life ==
He was born on June 1, 1851, in Cartagena, where his father, a seaman in the Spanish navy, was based.

In 1859 his father was relocated to the military base of San Fernando (Cádiz Province). At 14 he decided to join his brother Alejandro in the naval academy Colegio Naval Militar de San Carlos. This was a financial sacrifice for the family and he studied hard to get the best marks. At 16, after only two years, he joined the Spanish navy as a Guardiamarina de 2ª (Midshipman). He also studied geography, physics and astronomy.

Peral took part in combat in the Third Carlist War in Spain, and in Cuba. He was awarded a wide range of medals for his service.

In 1876, in Cádiz, Peral married María del Carmen Cencio, daughter of an army doctor. They had nine children but four of them died young.

In 1881, Peral was serving as a second lieutenant and member of a hydrographical team in the Philippines. While there, during a visit to the barber shop, he received a small cut in his temple, which caused lasting illness and later became the site of a brain tumor.

== Development of the submarine ==
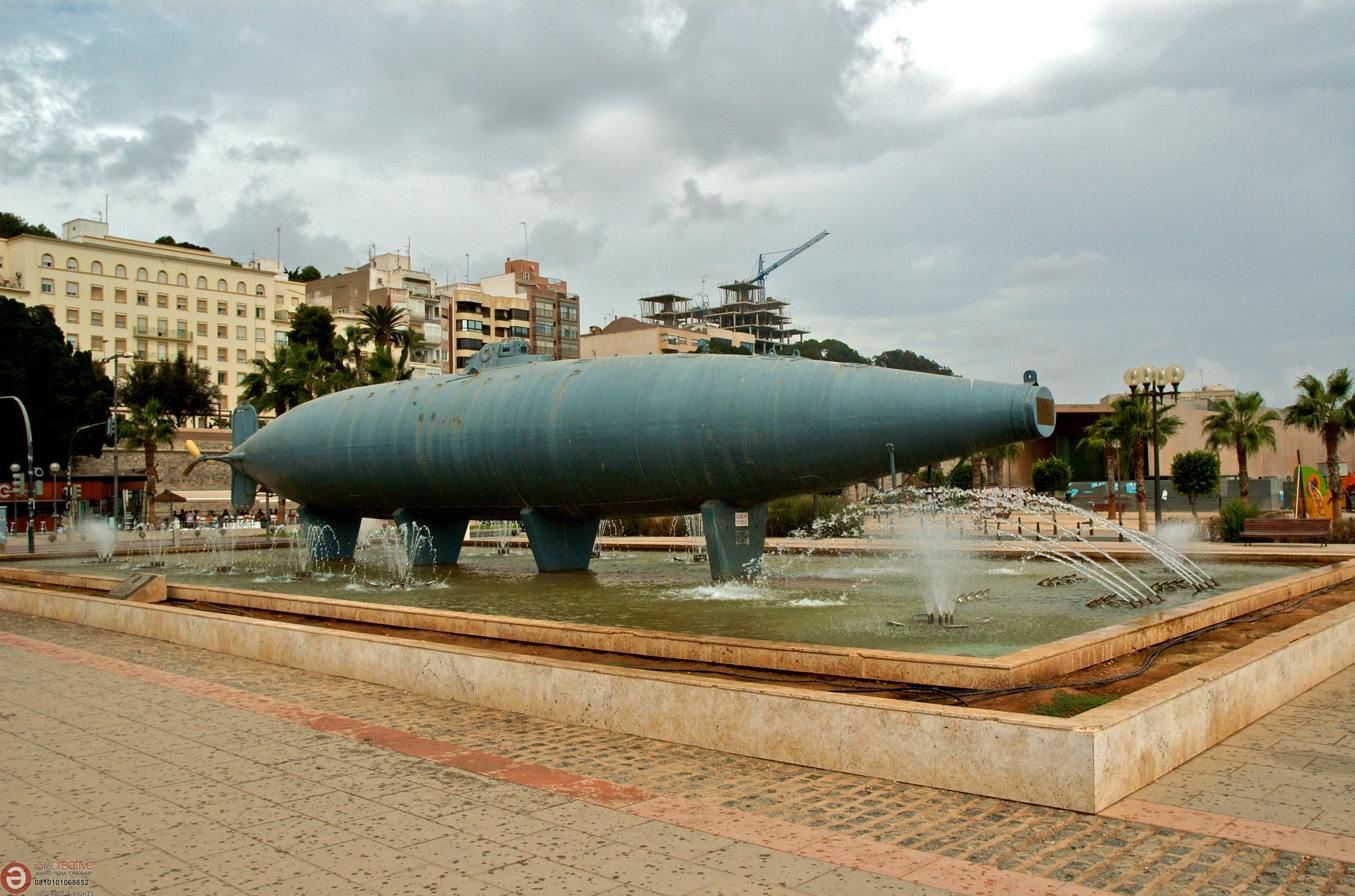
The submarine Peral.

Because of his ill-health Peral could not travel any more, so he was given a post in Cádiz, teaching in the new naval school Escuela de Ampliación de Estudios de la Armada. There he found time to pursue his idea of a full battery-powered submarine with a system to discharge torpedoes while under water. His main problems were his need for finance to develop and test his inventions, lack of official support, and especially his arrogance when dealing with superiors with less vision.

Peral's design for a submarine was first conceived on 20 September 1884, when he wrote a paper which would become his Proyecto de Torpedero Submarino ("Project for a submarine torpedoboat").

After performing several studies and experiments, and having gained support from his superiors and fellow officers, Peral presented his idea to the Spanish navy staff. In September 1885, he wrote a letter to the Spanish naval minister, vice-admiral Pezuela y Lobo. Pezuela y Lobo called Peral to Madrid to have a personal interview with him. After the interview Pezuela y Lobo agreed to finance Peral's preliminary studies in Cádiz with an initial budget of 5,000 pesetas before launching a program to build a full-scale submarine boat. The Peral submarine was the first practical submarine ever made. It was launched on September 8, 1888, and subsequently in a test with naval authorities it successfully made a simulated attack on a cruiser at night without being noticed and returned to port without any damage. The submarine was coastal, however, because it lacked a double-hull and Diesel engine (petrol engines were not reliable at the time). Its performance was hardly equaled ten years later in other submarines. But a second project was rejected by naval authorities. Peral was losing control over his project and getting frustrated. He destroyed the inside of the submarine plus the plans to avoid foreign spies copying it.

== Retirement and death ==
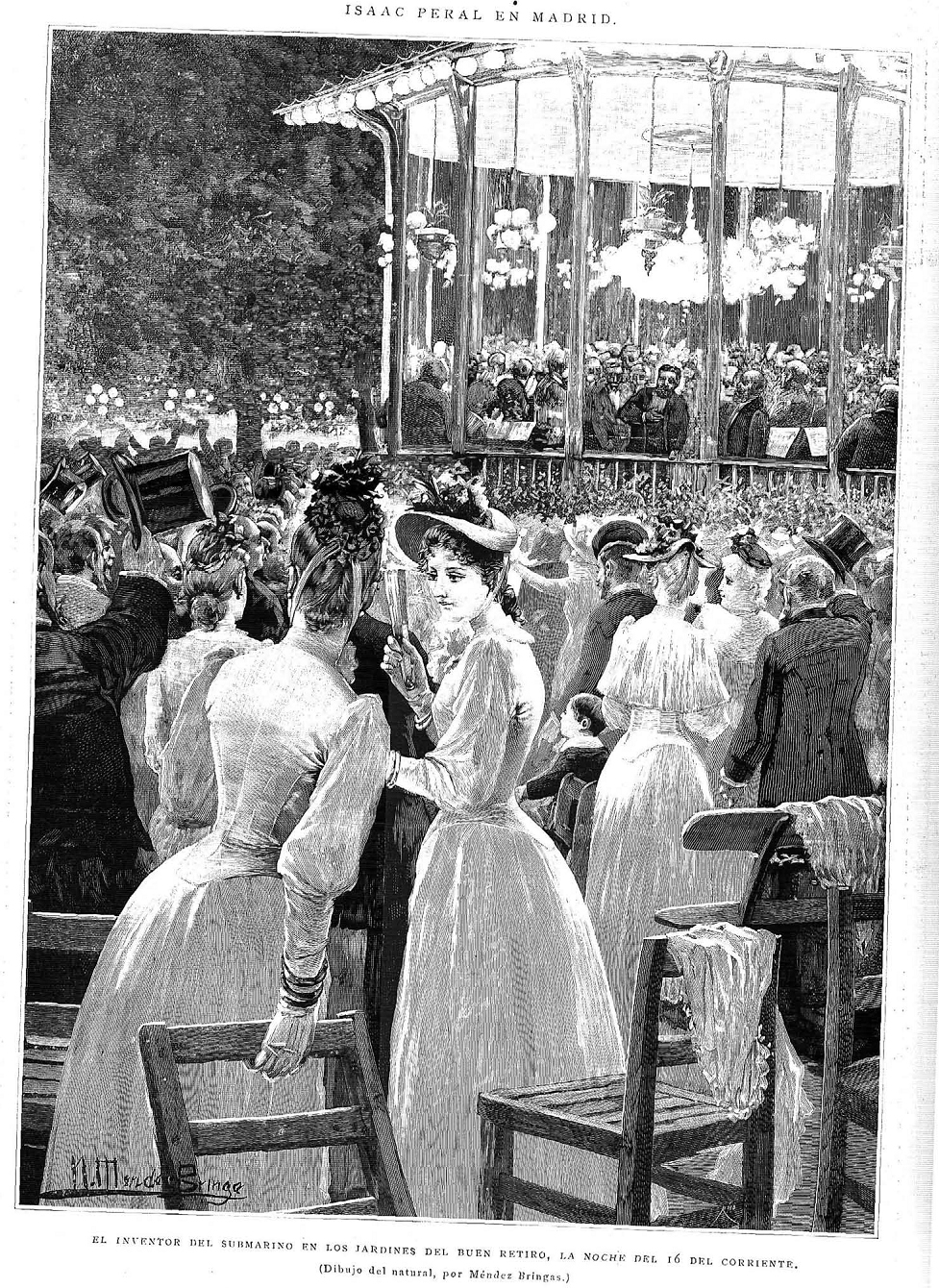
Reception to Isaac Peral in Madrid, summer of 1890, by Narciso Méndez Bringa.

Isaac Peral, frustrated with the group of senior naval engineers that were supposed to supervise his project, retired from active naval duty in November 1891. He established his family in Madrid, founding an electric company and still inventing and patenting other inventions, such as an electric machine gun or the blueprints of the first electric power plants of Spain. He still was hoping that his submarine design would be adopted by the government at any moment. One of his workshops during this period was at number 13, Calle de Génova, now the Headquarters of the People's Party.

After an operation in Berlin to cure the brain tumor he had been suffering from for some years, Peral contracted meningitis. He died from it in Berlin in May 1895. Initially buried in Madrid, in 1911 his body was relocated to Cartagena, where there is now a museum devoted to his persona and inventions.

== Subsequent developments in submarine design ==
In 1895 John Philip Holland marked a major step forward in submarine development, designing for the first time a mixed internal combustion/electric propulsion system that would overcome the limited range of batteries.

The first submarine to go on active duty in the Spanish Navy was built 22 years later based on the Holland class submarine and was named after Peral. His own experimental submarine was written off by the navy in 1913, but was salvaged in 1929 and sent to Cartagena, home port of the navy's submarine flotilla. It was kept in the local Arsenal, until it was handed over to the city, displayed from 1965 in different places of the harbour, and since 2012 shown in the nearby Naval Museum of Cartagena.

== Submarines with Peral's name in the Spanish Navy ==
Peral's submarine torpedo boat is known as Peral, but never bore this name in service.

Submarines in service that have received his name are:

- Isaac Peral, a Holland-type submarine in commission from 1917 to 1932
- Isaac Peral, a C-class submarine commissioned as C-1 in 1928, renamed Isaac Peral in 1930, and decommissioned in 1950
- Isaac Peral (S-32), ex-USS Ronquil (SS-396), a Balao-class submarine in commission in the Spanish Navy from 1971 to 1984
- Isaac Peral, an S-80 class submarine commissioned in 2023
