= Capture of the galleon Lion Couronné =

- Part of Franco-Spanish War (1635–1659)
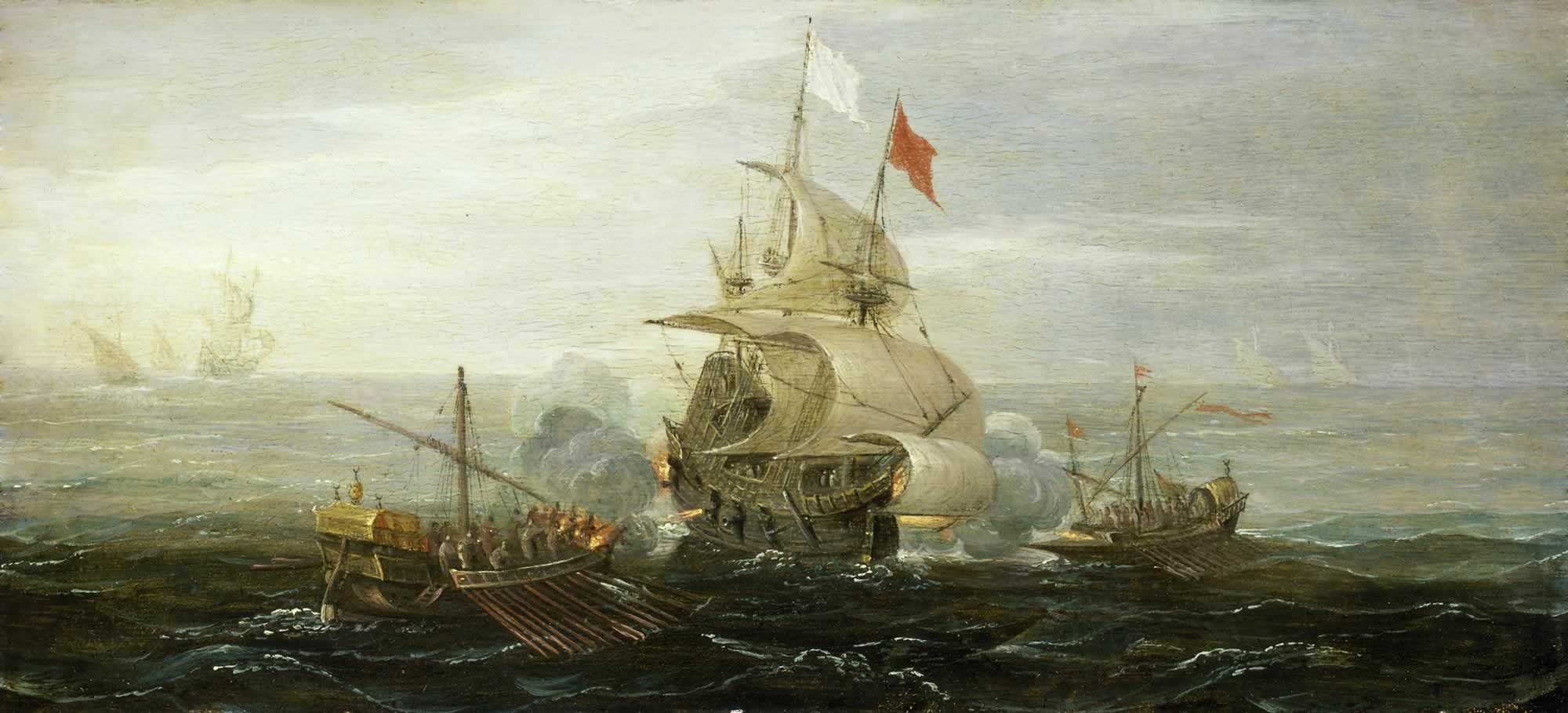
- Painting showing an example of galleys attacking a galleon, detail from A French Ship and Barbary Pirates (c. 1615) by Aert Anthoniszoon (1579–1620)
Date	17 June 1651
Location	Off Formentera, archipelago of the Balearic Islands, Mediterranean Sea 38.78°N 1.378°E
Result	Spanish victory

Belligerents
Spain	(Kingdom of France) France

Commanders and leaders
(Spain) John Joseph of Austria	(Kingdom of France) La Chesnaye †

Strength
11 galleys	1 galleon 1 saetía (Note: The saetía was a medieval ship of Latin sail, of a single bridge and two or three sticks, of greater tonnage than the galiot, which is used in the Mediterranean Sea for the transport of merchandise and the privateer war.)

Casualties and losses
99 killed 227 wounded All galleys damaged	103 or 200 killed 58 to 70 wounded 102 or 200 prisoners 1 galleon captured 1 saetía sunk

The capture of the galleon Lion Couronné was a naval engagement that took place off Formentera on 17 June 1651, during the Franco-Spanish War (1635–1659). A squadron of eleven Spanish galleys under John Joseph of Austria captured the French galleon Lion Couronné after a fight.

== Background ==
In early 1651, the Spaniards began preparations for a military campaign against the Catalan Revolt and its ally France, taking advantage of several favorable circumstances to carry it out. (Note: These circumstances were; some Spanish victories against the French at sea, the military decline of the Catalan rebels, the plague that broke out in Barcelona, Portugal's lack of support for France due to the break it had with England at that time, among others.) The viceroy of Sicily, John of Austria, was chosen by the Spanish government to lead this campaign, which consisted of recovering Barcelona.

On May 28, John sailed from Palermo to Catalonia with a squadron of eleven galleys and four transport ships with 40,000 bushels of wheat. Six of the galleys were from Naples, under Alvaro de Meló, due to the temporary absence of Commander Joanetín Doria; and five galleys from Sicily, under the Marquis of Bayonne.

=== Capture ===
On the way to Catalonia, John passed through Trapana, Caller, Mallorca, and Ibiza. In this last place he took refuge with the Spanish squadron, protecting himself from the strong wind of Levante that was blowing with great force. From the heights of that place, the Spaniards saw that in Formentera, off Ibiza, there was a French galleon and a saetía prize that were also protecting themselves from the strong wind. It was the galleon Lion Couronné, (Note: It was a French Navy galleon acquired in 1641. It had a displacement of 500 tons, with 28 or 36 guns and 205 or 400 men according to French and Spanish sources, respectively. On his first commission in 1643, he was the flagship of Commander Philippe Raquin des Gouttes. The galleon participated in some naval operations, such as the Battle of Orbetello in 1646; in the squadron of 16 ships under Admiral Maillé-Brézé and he was also in the Battle of Castellammare in 1647; in the Richelieu’s squadron of 29 ships.) under Captain La Chesnaye. John consulted with the commanders of his galleys about the possibility of attacking the French galleon, deciding to do it once the wind calms down. (Note: Fernández Duro indicates that the decision to attack the French galleon was probably influenced by the action of Cambrils, which occurred in November of the previous year.)

To carry out the attack, John placed the eleven galleys behind a point of the islands to await the departure of the Lion Couronné and the saetía. On 17 June, the French ships sailed from the place, so the Spanish galleys left the hiding place to approach the French galleon and board it. The French observed this movement, La Chesnaye sank the saetia and moved the crew to defend the galleon, then proceeded to attack the galleys with the guns to repel them. The guns of the French galleon caused serious damage to the Spanish galleys, but that did not stop them, and they reached the galleon, under the batteries, clinging to their sides, especially the bow, beginning the fight to dominate the ship's deck. The initial advantage that the French had, since the galleon had high sides and good artillery, was soon surpassed by the number of Spanish attackers. Finally, after an hour and a half or more of fighting, the Spanish capture the French galleon.

In this action, both parties had heavy casualties. The French casualties were 103 or 200 killed and 102 or 200 prisoners (including 58 or 70 wounded), taking into account the divergence between French and Spanish sources. Among the dead were the commander of the galleon and four knights of Malta. The Spanish casualties were 99 killed and 227 wounded. The Spanish galleys ended up damaged during the approach time towards the galleon; the galley commanded by Fernando Carrillo was almost undone, so the Spaniards were forced to return to Ibiza to repair them and disembark the wounded.

== Aftermath ==
After this event, John of Austria continued his trip to Catalonia. When he arrived in the area in July, he held the position assigned to him, beginning the campaign against Catalan rebels of Barcelona. In Mataró, he captured the 30-gun Catalan ship Nuestra Señora de la Estrella, which was protected by a coastal battery. In that same month the Siege of Barcelona began, which would last until October 1652, ending the Catalan Revolt. John of Austria's squadron, strengthened with more ships, was decisive in the blockade of Barcelona. In that squadron there were several previously captured French ships, including the Lion Couronné.

== See also ==
- List of ships of the line of France
- List of galleons of Spain
- Battle of the Gulf of Tunis
- Action of 3 October 1624
- Action of 23 November 1650

== Bibliography ==
- Fernández Duro, Cesáreo (1898). Armada española desde la unión de los reinos de Castilla y Aragón (in Spanish). Vol. IV. Madrid, España: Instituto de Historia y Cultura Naval.
- Demerliac, Alain (2004). La Marine de Louis XIII et de la régence d'Anne d'Autriche: Nomenclature des Navires Français de 1610 à 1661 (in French). Éditions OMEGA.
