= List of Spanish sail frigates =

This is a list of Spanish sail frigates built or acquired during the period 1700–1854.

Spanish frigates generally had religious names, often the names of saints or "our Lady". Those with primarily secular names (such as royal, geographical or adjectival names) usually had additionally a religious name (Avocación or alias), which is listed below in the second column where known.

An asterisk (*) in the "Launch date" column indicates the date of acquisition (purchase or capture) for vessels not built for the Spanish Navy.

== Habsburg era – pre-1700 ==
During the 17th century, and for much of the first half of the 18th century, the term 'frigate' (or 'fragata' in Spanish) encompassed ships with two complete gundecks rated at about 50 guns as well as smaller single-decked vessels. The smaller frigates evolved from the fast and lightly armed vessels built chiefly on the coast of (Spanish) Flanders, and employed in the English Channel and southern North Sea, as well as escorting the trade routes from the Spanish Netherlands to the north coast of Spain.

== Early Bourbon era – from 1700 to 1750 ==
Name	Avocación (alias)	Built at	Launch date	No of Guns	Fate/notes
Nuestra Señora de Gracia			1710*	40	
San Miguel			1712*	24	
Águila de Nantes			1713*	20	
Esperanza				28	
Sorpresa			1714*	36	
Juno			1714*	30	
Tigre			1714*	30	
San Fernando el Chico	San Fernando el Pequeño / Fernandillo		1714*	24	
Principe de Asturias (despues Ynfante)			1714*	30	
Santa Isabel	Reina Santa Isabel		1714*	22	
San Felipe	Felipillo/El Chico		1715*	24	
San Juan el Chico	San Juanico		1715*	30	
Santa Ana	Volante			24	
Perla de España				40	
San Francisco	San Antonio de Padua			22	
San Marcos				24	
Galera de España				36	
Victoria				40	
Conde de Tolosa				40	
Pingue Pintado				40	
Águila Volante				30	
Andalucia Baja				22	
Iris				26	
Júpiter				20	
Peregrina				36	
Tolosilla				30	
Providencia				24	
Sán Jose	El Real Jorge			30	
Rebeca				20	
San Francisco Javier	Hermiona			30	
San Jorge				36	
Selerais				30	
Unicornio				24	
Galera Victoria				40	
Galgo de Andalucia				24	ex-HMS Greyhound (1712)
Fidela				30	
Santa Rita	Galera de Neptuno			30	
Gusana				24	
Pingue Volante				22	
San Andrés				30	
Santa Susana				24	
Santa Teresa				20	
Júpiter				20	
Nuestra Señora de Atocha		Guarnizo	1723	30	Galley-frigate
Griega		Guarnizo	1723	30	Galley-frigate
Nuestra Señora de la Concepción		Guarnizo	1723	30	Galley-frigate
San Esteban Apedreado			1724	40	
Catalina	Santa Catalina			24	ex-Dutch
Jardín de Tritón				30	
Santiago	Neptuno			26	
Burlandín	El Burlando			44	
Gusana				24	
Nuestra Señora de Aránzazu		Pasajes	1726	30	
Nuestra Señora del Rosario			1696	44	
Santa Susana				26	
Neptuno				26	
Santa Bárbara	La Chata		1728	22	
La Señora Sara				22	
San Francisco Javier			1727	40	
Victoria			1729	40	
Galera Victoria			14 February 1729	40	wrecked 27 February 1729
Galera Victoria			12 June 1730	40	replacement for 1729 vessel; wrecked 16 December 1738
San Cayetano			1734 *	24	
Concepción				20	
Hermiona			14 July 1733	50	
Flora			1734	34	
Triunfo	San Gristóbal	Havana	1735	24	Galley-frigate; captured 4 December 1739.
Astrea	Santa Bárbara	Havana	1737	24	Galley-frigate; captured 4 December 1739.
Santa Bárbara	Estrella		1737	24	
Águila		Carraca	August 1737	28	Galley-frigate; wrecked 1744.
Aurora		Carraca	20 April 1738	28	Galley-frigate; broken up 6 January 1769.
Concepción			1738	?	
Flora	Santa Rosalía	Havana	31 August 1747	24	The only Spanish 'frigate' built in the 1740s was the first vessel for Spain with no apertures (e.g. oar or gun ports) along the lower deck. Wrecked 26 January 1768.

== Middle Bourbon era – from 1750 to 1808 ==
Name	Avocación (alias)	Built at	Launch date	No of Guns	Fate/notes
(La) Galga		Ferrol	1 March 1752	30	First 'true' frigate built under Jorge Juan concepts. Sold 27 June 1764
Pena		Carraca	1753	26	
Júpiter		Carraca	1753	22	Despatch vessel
Mercurio		Carraca	1753	22	Despatch vessel
Perla	Santa Isabel Reina	Cartagena	24 February 1752	22	Broken up 1777.
Dorada	Santa Ana	Cartagena	14 February 1753	22	Fireship 1780, deleted 1783.
Esmeralda	Santa Lucía Mártir	Cartagena	12 May 1753	30	Enlarged from Perla Class; fireship 1780, deleted later.
Venganza	Santa Inés	Carraca	4 June 1753	26	
Águila	Santa Maria Magdalena	Carraca	15 August 1753	22	
Victoria	Santa Gertrudis	Carraca	26 September 1753	24	
Flecha	Santa Saturnina	Carraca	28 October 1753	22	
Hermiona	Santa Mónica	Carraca	24 November 1753	24	
Industria	Santa Cristina	Carraca	13 June 1755	26	
Liebre	Santa Catalina	Carraca	26 July 1755	26	
Venus	Santa Brígida	Carraca	5 September 1755	26	
Ventura	Santa Clara	Carraca	21 October 1755	26	
Juno	Santa Cecilia	Cartagena	30 August 1755	26	
Palas	Santa Irene	Cartagena	29 November 1755	26	
Astrea	Santa Catalina; Virgen y Mártir	Cartagena	29 March 1756	26	
Concepción				22	
Tetis	Guadalupe	Havana	29 January 1761	22	
Fénix	Santa Bárbara		1758	22	
Nuestra Señora de la Soledad		Guarnizo	1 July 1761	30	
Santa Rosa			July 1767 *	22	ex-French Aguila
Santa Rosalía		Cartagena	1 April 1767	30	
Santa Catalina		Guarnizo	12 July 1767	34	
Santa Teresa		Guarnizo	18 February 1768	34	
Santa Bárbara		Guarnizo	15 June 1768	34	
Santa Gertrudis		Guarnizo	12 August 1768	24	
Santa Lucía		Havana	31 March 1770	34	
Nuestra Señora del Rosario		Ferrol	4 April 1770	34	
Nuestra Señora del Carmén		Ferrol	24 November 1770	34	
Santa Dorotea		Cartagena	1772	26	
Nuestra Señora de la Asunción		Ferrol	4 April 1772	34	
Santa Perpetua		Ferrol	31 July 1772	34	
Santa María de la Cabeza		Ferrol	2 July 1772	34	
Santa María Magdalena		Ferrol	7 July 1773	34	
Esmeralda			1773	26	
Santa Clara		Cartagena	23 April 1773	34	
Santa Margarita		Ferrol	23 June 1774	34	captured 11 November 1779
Santa Marta		Ferrol	5 July 1774	34	
Santa Dorotea		Ferrol	21 December 1775	34	captured 15 July 1798
Santa Clara		Ferrol	18 May 1776	34	
Santa Águeda		Havana	24 July 1776	30	
Santa Rufina		Cartagena	18 February 1777	34	
Santa Leocadia		Ferrol	24 March 1777	34	
Santa Cecilia		Havana	28 June 1777	34	
Santa Mónica		Cartagena	23 October 1777	34	
Grana	Nuestra Señora de la Paz	Ferrol	18 July 1778	28	
Santa Matilde		Havana	March 1778	34	
Nuestra Señora de la O		Havana	9 November 1778	34	
Santa Escolástica		Ferrol	31 March 1778	34	
Winchcomb			1779 *	26	
Santa Balbina			1780 *	34	ex-Helbrech
Santa Bibiana			1780 *	34	ex-Monstraut
Santa Paula			1780 *	34	ex-Geoffrey
Héroe			1780 *	26	broken up 1783
Real Jorge	San Jorge		1780 *	30	ex-Royal George
Santa Clara		Havana	10 July 1780	34	captured 5 October 1804
Santa María de la Cabeza		Havana	1781	34	
Santa Sabina		Ferrol	1 September 1781	40	1st Spanish 18pdr frigate; broken up 1828
Nuestra Señora de Loreto		Ferrol	15 December 1781	40	2nd Spanish 18pdr frigate; wrecked 29 May 1792
Santa Rosa		Ferrol	20 May 1782	34	
Nuestra Señora del Pilar		Ferrol	7 December 1782	40	3rd Spanish 18pdr frigate; broken up 1817
Colón				30	ex-British mercantile Gaton
Santa Elena		Ferrol	7 October 1783	40	4th Spanish 18pdr frigate; sunk in action 26 March 1797
Santa Tecla		Ferrol	5 May 1784	46	
Santa Casilda		Cartagena	12 March 1784	34	
Santa Brígida		Cartagena	5 March 1785	34	
Santa María		Ferrol	1785	34	
Nuestra Señora de la Paz		Ferrol	2 August 1785	34	
Nuestra Señora de Guadalupe		Havana	4 November 1786	34	
Santa Florentina		Cartagena	21 December 1786	34	
Santa Teresa		Ferrol	3 March 1787	34	
Santa Leocadia		Ferrol	2 June 1787	34	
Santa Catalina		Ferrol	9 December 1787	34	
Nuestra Señora de la Soledad		Cartagena	3 May 1788	34	
Nuestra Señora de las Mercedes		Havana	18 November 1788	34	
Perla	Santa Mónica	Cartagena	31 July 1789	34	
Nuestra Señora de Atocha		Havana	14 October 1789	40	
Mahonesa	Santa Mónica	Mahón	2 October 1789	34	
Palas	Santa Margareta	Ferrol	14 November 1789	34	
Juno	Nuestra Señora de los Dolores	Ferrol	31 December 1789	34	
Perla	Santa Mónica	Cartagena	31 July 1789	34	
Minerva	Santa Marta	Havana	14 October 1790	44	
Ceres	Nuestra Señora de la Almudeda	Havana	22 October 1790	40	
Preciosa	Divina Pastora	Carraca	18 January 1791	34	
Esmeralda	Santa Petronila	Mahón	30 May 1791	34	
Diana	Santa Ana	Mahón	10 March 1792	34	
Tetis	Santa Amalia	Ferrol	6 August 1793	44	
Gloria	Santa Mónica	Havana	1792	44	
Calypso		Rochefort	18 January 1793 *	34	ex-French Calypso (launched 1785)
Sirena	Santa Genoveva	Rochefort	19 February 1793 *	34	ex-French Heléne (launched 1791)
Venganza	Santa Petronila	Mahón	16 May 1793	34	
Pomona	Santa Quiteria	Ferrol	25 October 1794	40	
Ninfa	Nuestra Señora del Rosario	Mahón	19 December 1794	34	
Ifigenia		Lorient	February 1795 *	34	ex-French Iphigénie (launched 1777)
Fama	Santa Victoria	Cartagena	30 May 1795	34	
Flora	Santa María Magdalena de Pacís	Ferrol	19 December 1795	44	
Anfítrite	Santa Úrsula	Havana	1796	40	
Medea	Santa Bárbara	Ferrol	27 December 1797	40	
Proserpina		Mahón	16 May 1797	34	
Hermiona		Bristol	27 September 1797 *	34	ex-British Hermione, (launched 1782)
Prueba		Ferrol	9 December 1801	44	
Cornelia		Brest	14 June 1808 *	40	ex-French Cornelie

== Final phase – from 1815 to 1854 ==
The post-Napoleonic era began with the acquisition of six frigates from Russia in 1818. These proved of poor quality and were soon disposed of.

Name	Built at	Launch date	No of Guns	Fate/notes
Astrolabio	St Petersburg	17 September 1811	44	ex-Russian Avtroil, acquired 21 February 1818
Mercurio	St Petersburg	13 July 1815	44	ex-Russian Merkurii, acquired 21 February 1818
Patricio	Arkangelsk	21 June 1816	44	ex-Russian Patrikii, acquired 21 February 1818; renamed María Isabel soon after acquisition. Captured by Chileans 20 September 1819.
Ligera	St Petersburg	16 August 1816	44	ex-Russian Legkii, acquired 12 October 1818
Viva	Arkangelsk	26 May 1816	40	ex-Russian Provornyi, acquired 12 October 1818
Pronta	St Petersburg	16 August 1816	40	ex-Russian Pospeshnyi, acquired 12 October 1818
Aretusa	Bordeaux	29 April 1819	40	Stricken 1829
Iberia	Ferrol	3 March 1825	50	Stricken in December 1830
Lealtad	Ferrol	19 March 1825	50	Wrecked 13 January 1834 at Santander
Restauración	Ferrol	14 October 1826	50	Renamed Ville de Bilbao in 1837; hulked in 1840
Esperanza	Cavite	29 November 1834	48	
Cortes	Ferrol	27 July 1836	44	Stricken 21 March 1863
Isabel II	Ferrol	23 September 1836	44	Hulked in May 1860
Reina María Cristina	Ferrol	6 February 1837	52	Stricken 25 October 1852
Bailén	Ferrol	29 March 1854	40	Stricken 21 August 1865

== See also ==
- List of ships of the line of Spain
- List of galleons of Spain
- List of retired Spanish Navy ships
