= Spanish ship Galicia =

Four ships of the Spanish Navy have borne the name Galicia:

- Spanish ship Galicia (1729), launched in 1729 and captured by the British in 1741
- Spanish ship Galicia (1750), launched in 1750 and broken up in 1797
- Spanish landing ship Galicia (L31), launched in 1945 as USS San Marcos, acquired by Spain in 1971 and scrapped in 1989
- Spanish ship Galicia (L51), launched in 1997
