= List of galleons of Spain =

This is a list of a few of the carracks and galleons that served under the Spanish Crowns in the period 1410-1639; note that Castile and Aragon were separate nations, brought together in 1474 only through a unified Trastamaran and subsequently Habsburg monarchy, but each retaining its own governments and naval forces until the 18th century. From 1580 to 1640, Portugal was also part of this Habsburg Empire, but again its naval forces remained separate and are not included below. Not all these ships listed were built in Spain or its colonies:

== Carracks ==
- Santa Clara - Captured by England c. 1413, renamed Holigost
- Trinidad (24)
- Santa Catalina (24)
- San Juan Bautista (24) (650 tons)
- Santa Ana (30)
- Gran Grin (28)
- Santiago (25)
- Concepcion de Zubelzu (16)
- Concepcion de Juan del Cano (18)
- Magdalena (18)
- San Juan (21)
- Maria Juan (24)
- Manuela (12)
- Santa Maria de Montemayor (18)
- Trinidad Valencera 22
- Nuestra Senora del Pilar 11
- Santa Cruz 18
- San Juan de Gargoriu 16
- La Lavia (25)
- Santa Maria de Gracia 26
- La Juliana (32)
- Caridad Inglesa 12
- Santa Maria de la Rosa 26
- San Esteban (1607 shipwreck) 26
- San Salvador 25
- Nuestra Señora de la Visitación - Former English galleon Dainty, captured by the Spaniards in the action of San Mateo Bay in 1594.
- Santa Barbara 12
- S. Buenaventura 21
- San Juan Baptista (c. 1628)
- Santiago (c. 1628)
- San Juan Bautista (1635)
- San Agustín (1635)
- Santo Domingo de Guzman (1635)
- Nuestra Senora de Iclar (1635)
- San Antonio de Padua (1635)
- San Tomás de Aquino (c. 1638)
- San Agustín (c. 1638)
- San Ambrosio (c. 1638)
- San Gerónimo (c. 1638)
- Santo Cristo de Burgos (c. 1638)
- La Visitación de Nuestra Señora (c. 1639)
- Nuestra Señora de la O (c. 1639)
- La Natividad de Nuestra Señora (c. 1639)
- La Concepción (c. 1639)
- Nuestra Señora de la Purificatión (c. 1639)
- La Salutación de la Virgen (c. 1639)
- León Coronado - Former French galleon Lion Couronné, captured by the Spaniards in 1651.

== Galleons ==
- San Cristobal (36)
- San Juan Bautista (24)
- San Juan (el Menor) (24) (750 tons)
- San Pedro (el Mayor) (24)
- Santiago (el Mayor) (24)
- San Felipe y Santiago (24)
- Asunción (24)
- Nuestra Señora del Barrio (24)
- San Medel y Celedon (24)
- Santa Ana (24)
- Nuestra Señora de Begoña (24)
- San Juan Bautista (31)

The term galeón continued in use in Spanish sources for much longer than in the navies of Northern Europe, lasting even into the middle of the eighteenth century. However, the design of the capital ship had evolved during the second half of the 17th century, when (like other maritime states) when they had in reality adopted the concept of the ship of the line.

== See also ==
- List of battleships of Spain
- List of ships of the line of Spain
- List of Spanish sail frigates
- List of retired Spanish Navy ships
