= Action of 23 November 1650 =

1650 naval battle between Spain and France

- Part of the Franco-Spanish War (1635)
| Date | 23 November 1650 |
| Location | Off Cambrils, Catalonia, Spain 41.0463°N 1.0671°E |
| Result | Spanish victory |

Belligerents
| Kingdom of France | Spain |

Commanders and leaders
| (Kingdom of France) Baron de Ligny (POW) | (Spain) Duke of Alburquerque |

Strength
| 4 galleons | 6 galleys |

Casualties and losses
| 4 galleons and their crews captured 500 soldiers prisoners 4 pieces of artillery taken | Minimum |

The action of 23 November 1650 was a minor naval battle between Spain and France, in which a small Spanish squadron of 6 galleys commanded by Don Francisco Fernández de la Cueva, Duke of Alburquerque, captured the entirety of a French squadron of galleons under the Baron de Ligny, near Cambrils, during the Franco-Spanish War (1635-1659). This case is almost unique in naval history, 6 galleys with 30 guns in total, completely defeated a squadron of four galleons with 86 guns in total, and whose crew had been reinforced by 500 musketeers.

== Battle ==
The French fleet consisted of a galleon of 500 tons and 30 cannons, 2 of 300 tons with 20 cannons, and the last of 300 tons and 16 cannons. It was sent filled with provisions to help the defenders in the Siege of Tortosa, but the squadron of the Duke of Albuquerque, knowing the enemy's plans, intercepted the French by surprise with 6 galleys of 5 cannons each, achieving a complete victory. The Spaniards captured all the artillery (2 pieces of artillery of campaign and 4 mortars), ammunition carts, flags, equipment (over 1,000 musketry), and supplies from the enemy.

== Aftermath ==
King Philip IV of Spain personally congratulated the Duke of Albuquerque for the victory. On 4 December 1650, the French troops led by the Duke of Mercoeur finally capitulated to the Spanish forces commanded by the Marquis of Mortara at Tortosa.

== See also ==
- Capture of the galleon Lion Couronné

== Bibliography ==
- Israel, Jonathan. Conflicts of empires: Spain, the low countries and the struggle for world supremacy, 1585-1713 Hambledon Continuum Publishing (2003) ISBN 1-85285-161-9
- (in Spanish) Rodríguez González, Agustín Ramón. Victorias por mar de los Españoles. Biblioteca de Historia. Madrid 2006.
- Black, Jeremy. European warfare 1494-1660. Routledge. (2002) ISBN 978-0-415-27532-3.
- (in Spanish) Sanz, Fernando Martín. La política internacional de Felipe IV. Fernando Martín Sanz. (2003) ISBN 978-987-561-039-2.
- (in Spanish) Mossèn Sanabre. La acción de Francia en Cataluña por la pugna de la hegemonia en Europa. Barcelona (1956)
- (in Spanish) Castrillo González, Carmen. Catálogo de manuscritos de la Biblioteca Universitaria de Salamanca. Escrito por Biblioteca Universitaria de Salamanca.
- (in Catalan) Muñoz i Sebastià, Joan Hilari/Querol Coll, Enric. La Guerra dels Segadors a Tortosa 1640-1651. Romanya-Valls SA (2004) ISBN 84-9791-069-9
