= Jeanne Herscher-Clément =

French pianist and composer (1878–1941)

A portrait of Jeanne Herscher-Clément dedicated to Denise

Jeanne Herscher-Clément (Vincennes, 1878 – Givry, 1941) was a French pianist and composer. In 1922, she provided the music for a staging of La Mort de Souper, a farce by Roger Semichon originally published in 1913 after the 16th-century farce La Condamnation de Banquete by Nicole de La Chesnaye.

"The work of Mme Herscher-Clément reveals a unity of sentiment and musical atmosphere—the product of a sincere art, crafted with excellent taste. A dialogue, marked by a restrained and delicately nuanced touch, unfolds between the orchestra and the piano. The final section of this *Concertino*—developed as a free fugue and possessing a rich, resonant sonority—was particularly well-received."

This is what was written in 1931, in the pages of a Parisian newspaper, regarding the Concertino for piano and orchestra by Jeanne Herscher-Clément. Though largely forgotten today, this French composer once caused quite a stir within Parisian musical circles.

Her avant-garde, nonconforming spirit, and fascination with the music of other cultures were admired by composers such as Gabriel Pierné, Maurice Ravel, and Charles Koechlin—especially Koechlin, whose work she knew exceptionally well.

As a student at the Paris Conservatory, she studied piano under Raoul Pugno and harmony under Gabriel Fauré. Her classmates included Paul Ladmirault—a key figure in early 20th-century Breton music—and Juliette Toutain, the first female composer to enter the *Prix de Rome* competition for musical composition in 1903.

Jeanne Herscher-Clément composed numerous *mélodies* (art songs), piano pieces, chamber music, at least one concertante work for piano and orchestra, and various symphonic pieces—most notably *Images d’Asie*, which appears to have been her most celebrated work.

Her frequent travels abroad provided the perfect opportunity to collect musical material. Her research and writings on the music of the Sioux people of North America and the Papuan peoples of New Guinea remain significant points of reference within the field of ethnomusicology from that era. 1920–1940.

Towards the end of the 1920s, she left to take charge of the Birmingham Conservatory in the state of Alabama. There, she encountered the reality of racial segregation, the culture and music of African Americans, and, later, the music of Native Americans.

Her close collaboration with the renowned Chief Os-Komon—a dancer, singer, and actor from the Yakima tribe—proved fruitful, resulting in a musical fresco composed of traditional Sioux songs, arranged for voice, flute, clarinet, and piano.

A visionary, she concluded one of her studies, titled "A Few Words on Indigenous Music in New Guinea," with the following observation: "Let us hope that the value of such first-hand documentation receives the attention it deserves, and that it may still be possible to collect—and, above all, to record—a significant number of these examples before so-called 'white' culture takes root in these pristine lands, bringing with it a tendency to level and homogenize the entire face of the world."

== Works ==
- Song cycle Le bestiaire du paradis. "Le furet"; "La truite"; "Le coq et la poule"; "L'araignée"; "Le chat"; "La reine des abeilles"; "La huppe"; "La chouette"; "Le petit singe"; "Les martins-pêcheurs"; "La mouche"; "Le psaume du merle". Recording by Céline Ricci (soprano) and Daniel Lockert (piano) 2012.
- Piano Works: Barcarolle, Trois Pieces: Nuit, Soir Calme, Vagues, Piano Concertino

== Piano Concertino ==
- The two-piano reduction of her Piano Concertino is cataloged by the University of Boulder Colorado. Her work was orchestrated by Allie Faulkner in 2026 and published as a Midi Realization on YouTube.
