= List of ships of the line of Spain =

This is a list of Spanish ships of the line (comprising the battlefleet) built or acquired during the period 1640-1854:
Those with 94 or more guns were three-deckers, while all the others listed were two-deckers. The Spanish term for ships of the line was navíos, but during the latter part of the Habsburg era (until 1700) ships continued to be designated as galeón. Those ships with secular names (e.g. royal, geographical or adjectival names) were additionally given an official religious name (or advocación) which appears below in parentheses following the secular name.

Until 1716 there was not one single Spanish Navy but several naval forces, of which the Armada del Mar Océano was the primary one but several other distinct forces existed. The Real Armada ("Royal Navy") was created by the newly-established Bourbon government in 1716, but the other armadas (in Spanish, the word "armada" is used for both "navy" and "fleet") endured for several years thereafter. During the early 1750s, the term Real Armada was replaced by Armada Española.

== The later Habsburg fleet - 1640 to 1700 ==
- Lion de Oro 24 guns (May 1641)
- San Francisco (1645)
- Asiento del Consulado (1648)
- Asiento de Diego de Noia (1650)
- León Coronado 28 (launched 17 June 1651)
- Nuestra Señora de la Concepción (c. 1656)
- Nuestra Señora del Buen Consejo (c. 1662)
- Santiago 58 (1662)
- San Miguel (1662)
- San Joseph (1662)
- San Pedro y San Pablo (c. 1662)
- San Ignacio 36 (1664)
- San Salvador 40 (1664)
- Nuestra Señora del Rosario 70 (1665)
- Nuestra Señora del Pilar 64 (1668)
- Santa Ana 54 (1668)
- Concepcion de Napoles 40 (1672)
- San Antonio de Napoles 44 (1672)
- San Bernardo 44 (1672)
- San Carlos 44 (1672)
- Santiago 80 (1673) - not recorded after 1673
- San Joaquín 80 (1676) - not recorded after 1676
- Santa Rosa 56 (1677) - Captured by Britain at the Battle of Cape Passaro, 1718, BU c. 1731
- Nuestra Señora de la Concepción y las Animas 94 guns (1687 at Colindres) Spain's first three-decked warship
- Santisima Trinidad 80 guns (1692 at Colindres)
- San Juan 56 (1683) - captured in August 1692
- Nuestra Señora de la Concepción class. These two ships served as the capitana (flagship) and almiranta (second-in-command flagship) respectively of the Armada del Mar del Sur. They were both reduced to 30 guns when substantively rebuilt in 1726-28.
  - Santísimo Sacramento 40 (launched 1692 at Guayaquil) - broken up in 1743
  - Nuestra Señora de la Concepción 36 (launched 1692 at Guayaquil) - broken up in 1744
- San Francisco 70 (1695) - no report after 1700
- Nuestra Señora del Rosario 42 (acquired 1696 at Veracruz). wrecked in September 1705
- Santa Maria de Tezanos y Las Animas 60 (1697) - foundered 14 November 1701
- Sagrario 60 (launched 1697 at Zorroza)
- Santo Cristo de San Roman 50 (1698) - wrecked 31 July 1715
- Nuestra Señora de la Almudena y San Cayetano 50 (1699) - broken up 1708
- San José class. These two ships served as the capitana (flagship) and almiranta (second-in-command flagship) respectively of the Armada de la Carrera de Indias.
  - San José 60 (launched 1698 at Orio) - blown up on 8 June 1708
  - San Joaquín 60 (launched 1698 at Orio) - captured on 7 August 1711
- Nuestra Señora de Begoña 60 (1699) - broken up 1710
- Nuestra Señora del Carmen 30 (1699) - lost at Vigo
- San Juan Bautista 50 (1700) - wrecked in September 1702
- Rubí 50 (Acquired 1700) - Wrecked 1727

== The Early Bourbon fleet – 1701 to 1728 ==
- Nuestra Señora de Guadalupe 50/58 (Acquired 1703) - Wrecked 1724
- Salvador 66 (launched 1703 at Zorroza)
- Porto Coeli Class, 62 guns
  - Porto Coeli 62 (launched 1704 at Orio)
  - Santa Teresa 62 (launched 1704 at Orio)
- Nuestra Señora del Carmen y San Antonio 70 (1711)
- Nuestra Señora del Carmen 60 (1713)
- Real de Mazi (El Real) 60 (Acquired 1714) - Captured by Britain at the Battle of Cape Passaro, 11 August 1718, BU c. 1731
- Nuestra Señora de Begoña 54/70 (launched 1703 at Genoa, acquired February 1714) - Stricken 1724
- Peibo del ler San Francisco 60 (Acquired 1714) - Wrecked 1716
- Pembroke 60 (1694, ex-British Pembroke, acquired 1709/14) - Wrecked 1718
- Lanfranco 60 (Acquired 1716) - Wrecked 1716
- Nuestra Señora de Las Vinas 60 - Sunk 11 August 1718
- San Pedro Class 60 gun
  - San Pedro 60 (launched 26 March 1716 at Pasajes) - Wrecked 31 December 1718
  - Santa Isabel 60 (launched 7 September 1716 at Pasajes) - Captured by Britain at the Battle of Cape Passaro 11 August 1718, BU c. 1731
  - San Juan Bautista 60 (launched 1 January 1717 at Pasajes) - Wrecked 26 December 1719
  - San Luis 60 (launched 26 June 1717 at Orio) - Wrecked 10 May 1720
  - San Fernando 60 (launched 26 June 1717 at Orio) - Scuttled 14 November 1719
  - San Felipe 60 (launched 26 July 1717 at Orio)
- San Carlos 60 (launched 1717 at Orio) - Captured by Britain at the Battle of Cape Passaro 11 August 1718, BU c. 1731
- San Felipe el Real 80 (launched 25 May 1716 at Sant Feliu de Guíxols) - Captured by Britain at the Battle of Cape Passaro 11 August 1718; towed as a prize to Mahón (Menorca) where blew up by accident in September 1718.
- Hermione 50 (Acquired 1716) - Stricken 1721
- San Isidro 50 (1716) - Captured by Britain at the Battle of Cape Passaro 11 August 1718, BU c. 1731
- Hércules 50 (Acquired 1716) - Stricken 1718
- Príncipe de Asturias 70 (1695, ex-Genovese, sold 1717, ex-French Cumberland, sold 1715, ex-British HMS Cumberland 80, captured 1707) - Captured by Britain at the Battle of Cape Passaro 11 August 1718, sold to Austria 1720, who renamed her San Carlos and deployed her to Naples (thus earning the distinction of service in five countries' navies). BU 1733.
- Santa Rosa Palermo (Santa Rosalia) 60 (1717?, ex-Piedmontese, captured 1718) - Scuttled 1719
- Victoria 60 (1717?, ex-Piedmontese, captured 1718) - Scuttled 1719
- Triunfo 60/66 (1717?, ex-Piedmontese, captured 1718) - Scuttled 1719
- Cambi 60/66 (launched 27 November 1718 at Sant Feliu de Guíxols) - Burnt 1725
- Catalán 62 (launched 12 January 1719 at Sant Feliu de Guíxols) - Stricken 1731
- (6 battleships) - Burnt on stocks at Pasajes, 1719
- (3 battleships) - Burnt on stocks at Santoña, 1719
- Conde de Tolosa (San José) 56/58 (purchased 1718 from France) - Wrecked 15 October 1724
- Conquistador 62/64 (ex-Genovese, sold 1720, ex-French, sold 1711, ex-British HMS Gloucester 60, captured 1709) - Stricken 16 November 1728
- San Francisco 62 (Acquired 1720) - Wrecked 1739
- Sanguineto (Estrella del Mar) 64 (purchased 30 July 1720 at Genoa) - Stricken 1730
- Lanfranco (Nuestra Señora del Pilar) 62 (purchased 28 September 1720 at Genoa) - Wrecked 1739
- Gran Princesa de los Cielos 80 (purchased 23 October 1720 at Genoa) - wrecked 1 April 1726
- Infante 60 (purchased 15 November 1720 at Genoa) - Wrecked 15 July 1733
- San Foit (San Jorge) 60 (purchased June 1721 at Amsterdam) - Stricken December 1721
- Gallo Indiano 58 (purchased 1723, built at Tlacotalpan) - Wrecked 15 July 1733
- Potencia 58 (Acquired 1723) - Stricken 1738
- San Esteban 50 (1723) - Stricken 1745
- San Luis Class 62 guns
  - San Luis 62 (launched 1724 at Guarnizo) - Stricken 1745
  - San Fernando 62 (launched 1724 at Guarnizo) - Hulked 1746
  - San Carlos 62 (launched 11 September 1726 at Guarnizo) - Scuttled 5 April 1741
  - San Antonio 62 (launched 1 January 1727 at Guarnizo) - Stricken 1750
- San Francisco Javier 50/52 (1724) - Hulked 1749
- San Juan 54/60 (1724) - Stricken 1741
- San Felipe 80 (launched 11 September 1726 at Guarnizo) - Scuttled 5 April 1741 at Cartagena de Indias
- Incendio (San Lorenzo) 58 (1726) - Wrecked 1739
- San Francisco de Asís 52 (ex-Dutch, captured 1726) - Hulked 1735
- Retiro (San Geronimo) 54 (1727) - Sold 1737
- Rosa 56 (1727) - Wrecked 1736
- Paloma Indiana 52 (1727) - Stricken 1745
- Fuerte (Nuestra Señora de Guadalupe) 60 (launched 1727 at Havana) - Sold 1759
- Constante (San Dionisio) 64 (launched 1728 at Havana) - Wrecked 22 February 1730

== The First French phase - 1729 to 1750 ==
- Santa Ana class, 70 guns
  - Santa Ana 70 (completed 14 February 1729 at Guarnizo) - Stricken 30 November 1745
  - Reina 70 (completed 14 July 1729 at Guarnizo) - Stricken 3 July 1743
- Victoria 50 (launched 14 February 1729 at Guarnizo) - Wrecked 1738
- Santiago 60 (launched 1729 at Guarnizo) - Stricken 29 November 1745
- Andalucia class, 62 guns
  - Andalucía (Nuestra Señora del Carmen) 62 (launched 17 January 1730 at Pasajes) - Wrecked September 1740
  - Santa Teresa 62 (launched 17 January 1730 at Pasajes) - Stricken 1 November 1743
  - Castilla 62 (launched 17 January 1730 at Pasajes) - Stricken 1736
  - Rubí 62 (launched 31 July 1731 at Pasajes) - Wrecked 15 October 1733
- Hércules class, 60 guns
  - Hércules 60 (launched 14 April 1729 at Cadiz) - Stricken 1749
  - Real Familia 60 (launched 3 February 1732 at Cadiz) - BU 1750
- Santa Isabel 80 (launched 17 January 1739 at Guarnizo) - Stricken 1747
- Galicia class, 70 guns
  - Galicia 70 (launched 28 July 1729 at Grana Shipyard, Ferrol) - Scuttled 5 April 1741, captured and raised by Britain, renamed Galicia Prize, scuttled 1742(?)
  - León 70 (launched 27 August 1731 at Grana Shipyard, Ferrol) - taken to pieces in 1749.
- Conquistador 62 (launched 9 November 1730 at Havana) - Scuttled 5 April 1741
- Príncipe class, 70 guns
  - Princesa 70 (completed 17 August 1731 at Guarnizo) - Captured by Britain 19 April 1740, renamed Princessa, sold 1784
  - Príncipe 70 (completed 17 August 1731 at Guarnizo) - Stricken 11 July 1746
- Genovés 54 (Acquired 1730) - Wrecked 1740
- Carmen 64 (1730) - BU 1764
- Fama Volante 52 (Acquired 1730 at Genoa) - Stricken 1740
- Guipúzcoa 60/64 (launched 19 August 1731 at Pasajes) - Wrecked 25 April 1741
- Galga 56 (1731) - Wrecked 1750
- Real Felipe 112 (launched 1732 at Guarnizo) - Stricken 1750
- San Isidro 62 (launched 1732 at Guarnizo) - Scuttled March 1742
- Constante (San Cristóbal) 64 (launched 1732 at Havana) - Sold after 1752
- África class, 60 guns
  - África (San Jose) 60 (launched 13 April 1733) - Scuttled 1741
  - Europa (Nuestra Señora del Pilar) 60 (launched May 1734 at Havana) - Scuttled 1762 at Havana
  - Asia (Nuestra Señora de Loreto) 60 (launched 18 December 1735 at Havana) - Stricken 1746
  - América (Nuestra Señora de Bethlehem) 60 (launched 21 January 1736 at Havana) - Captured by Britain at Havana 12 June 1762
- Nueva España 70 (launched 1 March 1734 at Quatzalcoalcos) - Sold 1752
- Esperanza 50 (launched 21 December 1735 at Havana) - Stricken 1747
- Dragón (Santa Rosa de Lima) 64 (launched 28 June 1737 at Havana) - Scuttled 5 April 1741
- Castilla (Santo Cristo de Burgos) 60 (launched 13 June 1737 at Havana) - Wrecked 1747
- Invencible Class 70 guns
  - Invencible (San Ignacio) 70 (launched 4 November 1739 at Havana) - Burnt 1741
  - Glorioso (Nuestra Señora de Belén) 70 (launched 1739 at Havana) - Captured by Britain 19 October 1747
- Bizarra (Nuestra Señora de Guadalupe) 50 (launched 13 March 1739 at Havana) - Sold 23 March 1759 at Havana
- Poder 66 (Acquired 1740) - Captured by Britain at the Battle of Toulon, 1744, recaptured and scuttled, 1744
- Soberbio 66 (Acquired 1740) - Sold 1746
- Brillante 66 (Acquired 1740) - Sold 1746
- Neptuno 66 (Acquired 1740) - Sold 1748
- Halcón 60 (Acquired 1740) - Sold 1748
- Oriente 64 (Acquired 1740) - Sold 1746
- Ave de Gracia 50 (Acquired 1742) - Sold 1744
- Reina class, 70 guns
  - Reina 70 (launched 27 May 1743 at Havana) - Captured by Britain 1762, same name, sold 1775
  - Invencible (San Jose) 70 (launched 19 December 1743 at Havana) - Burnt 1750
- San Felipe 70 (launched 23 December 1743 at Guarnizo) - Stricken 14 January 1762
- Conquistador class, 70 guns
  - Conquistador (Jesus, Maria y José) 64 (launched 28 January 1745 at Havana) - Captured by Britain 1748
  - Dragón 60 (launched 2 May 1745 at Havana) - Wrecked 29 May 1783
- África class, 70 guns, ordered 1745 at Havana
  - África (San Francisco de Asis) 70 (launched 17 August 1746 at Havana) - Scuttled 1748
  - Vencedor (Santo Tomas) 70 (launched 22 December 1746 at Havana) - Burnt 1750
  - Tigre (San Lorenzo) 70/74 (launched 17 December 1747 at Havana) - Captured by Britain 11 August 1762, same name, sold 1784
- Rayo class, both ordered 1 July 1747 at Havana
  - Fénix (San Alejandro) 80 (launched 26 February 1749) - Captured by Britain at the Battle of Cape St. Vincent, 16 January 1780, renamed HMS Gibraltar, BU 1836
  - Rayo (San Pedro Apostol) 80 (launched 28 June 1749) - Reconstructed as a 100-gun three-decked ship in 1804; foundered after the Battle of Trafalgar, 23 October 1805
- Princesa class, ordered 1747-48 at Havana
  - Princesa (Santa Barbara) 74 (launched 15 September 1750 at Havana) - Captured by Britain at the Battle of Cape St. Vincent, 16 January 1780, renamed HMS Princessa, BU 1809
  - Infante (San Luis Gonzaga) 70/74 (launched 20 June 1750 at Havana) - Captured by Britain 11 August 1762, renamed HMS Infanta, sold 1775
  - Galicia (Santiago el Mayor) 70/74 (launched 3 August 1750 at Havana) - Stricken 1797

== The English phase - 1751 to 1769 ==
Note that surviving 68-gun ships were re-rated as 70 guns in 1770 and as 74-gun ships in October 1793.
This era commenced with the recruitment of British leading shipwrights who became the principal builders at the Naval Dockyards.

- Experimental group
  - Fernando (Santa Bárbara) 64 (launched 8 September 1751 at Ferrol) - Wrecked 3 January 1769
  - Septentrión (San Hermenegildo) 64 (launched 26 December 1751 at Cartagena) - Wrecked 1783
  - Asia 64 (launched 17 March 1752 at Ferrol) - Scuttled 11 June 1762 at Havana
  - África 68 (launched 20 November 1752 at Cadiz) - stricken 8 August 1806 and BU 1809
- Firme class both ordered May 1752 at Cadiz (Carraca Dyd), 68 guns
  - Firme (San Zenón) 68 (launched 22 June 1754 at Cadiz) - Captured by Britain 22 July 1805, retaining same name, BU 1814
  - Aquiles (San Ramón) 68 (launched 5 September 1754 at Cadiz) - Stricken 7 August 1790
- España 58 (launched 1 June 1757 at Cádiz) - Stricken to BU 12 December 1807
- Eolo class all ordered 1752 at Ferrol (Esteiro Dyd), 68 guns
  - Oriente (San Diego de Alcala) 68 (launched 15 August 1753 at Ferrol) - Stricken 27 September 1806
  - Eolo (San Juan de Dios) 68 (launched 28 August 1753 at Ferrol) - Stricken 20 March 1864
  - Aquilón (San Dámaso) 68 (launched 10 March 1754 at Ferrol) - Captured by Britain 11 August 1762, retaining same name, later renamed HMS Moro, BU 1770
  - Neptuno (San Justo) 68 (launched 6 July 1754 at Ferrol) - Scuttled 11 August 1762
  - Magnánimo (San Pastor) 68 (launched 30 November 1754 at Ferrol) - Wrecked 12 July 1794
  - Gallardo (San Juan de Sahagún) 68 (launched 18 October 1754 at Ferrol) - Scuttled 16 February 1797
  - Brillante (San Dionisio) 68 (launched 20 August 1754 at Ferrol) - Burnt 10 October 1790
  - Vencedor (San Julian) 68 (launched 11 June 1755 at Ferrol) - transferred to France 1806, renamed Argonaute, captured by Spain 1808, renamed Vencedor, wrecked 1810
  - Glorioso (San Francisco Javier) 74 (launched 29 January 1755 at Ferrol) - stricken 5 May 1818 to BU
  - Guerrero (San Raimundo) 68 (launched 27 March 1755 at Ferrol) - BU 1844
  - Soberano (San Gregorio) 68 (launched 9 August 1755 at Ferrol) - Captured by Britain at Havana on 14 August 1762, retaining same name, BU 1770
  - Héctor (San Bernardo) 68 (launched 22 September 1755 at Ferrol) - stricken 11 June 1768 and BU 1790
- Serio class, first four ordered April 1752 at Guarnizo; four more ordered there in March 1753, but the final pair (Diligente and Dominante) were cancelled in 1754.
  - Serio (San Víctor) 68 (launched December 1753 at Guarnizo) - BU 1805
  - Poderoso (San Pantaleón) 68 (launched January 1754 at Guarnizo) - Burnt 27 August 1779
  - Soberbio (San Bonifacio) 68 (launched March 1754 at Guarnizo) - Stricken 23 June 1764
  - Arrogante (San Antonio de Padua) 68 (launched March 1754 at Guarnizo) - Scuttled 16 February 1797
  - Hércules 68 (launched late 1754 or early 1755 at Guarnizo) - stricken 4 July 1761
  - Contento 68 (launched January 1755 at Guarnizo) - stricken 6 October 1761
- Tridente 64 (launched 15 July 1754 at Cartagena) - Stricken 1771
- Terrible class, both ordered March 1752 at Cartagena, 68 guns
  - Terrible (San Pablo Apóstol) 68 (launched 10 November 1754 at Cartagena) - Stricken 1811
  - Atlante (San José) 68 (launched 21 December 1754 at Cartagena) - transferred to France 22 September 1801, renamed Atlas 1803, captured by Spain 1808, same name, BU 1817
- Arrogante 68 (-) - Burnt on stocks at Ferrol, 1754
- Triunfante class all ordered 1753-54 at Ferrol (Esteiro Dyd), 68 guns
  - Triunfante 68 (launched 1 February 1756 at Ferrol) - Wrecked 5 January 1795
  - Dichoso 68 (launched 18 March 1756 at Ferrol) - Stricken 15 October 1784
  - Monarca 68 (launched 13 June 1756 at Ferrol) - Captured by Britain at the Battle of Cape St. Vincent, 1780, retaining same name, sold 1791
  - Diligente 68 (launched 25 September 1756 at Ferrol) - Captured by Britain at the Battle of Cape St. Vincent, 1780, renamed HMS Diligence, BU 1784
- Peruano 50 (launched 1757 at Guayaquil) - Sold 26 January 1790
- Campeón 60 (launched 27 January 1758 at Ferrol) - Hulked 1778, BU 1824
- Conquistador 60 (launched 29 July 1758 at Cádiz) - Captured by Britain 11 August 1762, retaining same name, stricken 1782
- Astuto (San Eustaquio) 58/60 (launched 10 April 1759 at Havana) - BU 1810
- Príncipe Class 68 guns, later 70. Ordered 1757 as replacements for the cancelled Serio class ships.
  - Príncipe (San Mateo) 68 (launched 23 December 1759 at Guarnizo) - Sold 15 May 1776
  - Victorioso (Nuestra Señora de la Concepción) 68 (launched early 1760 at Guarnizo) - Sold 15 May 1776
- San Carlos Class, 80 guns
  - San Carlos 80 (-) - Destroyed on stocks at Havana, 1762
  - Santiago 80 (-) - Destroyed on stocks at Havana, 1762
- Buen Consejo 60 (purchased 18 November 1761 at Genoa) - stricken 8 July 1762
- San Genaro 60 (launched 27 October 1761 at Havana) - Captured by Britain at Havana on 14 August 1762, retaining same name, lost 1763
- San Antonio 60 (launched 17 December 1761 at Havana) - Captured by Britain at Havana on 14 August 1762, retaining same name, sold 1775
- Velasco class all ordered 1762-64 at Cartagena, 68/70 guns
  - Velasco 68/70 (launched 18 August 1764 at Cartagena) - stricken 4 September 1796
  - San Genaro 68/70 (launched 23 December 1765 at Cartagena) - transferred to France on 24 July 1801, renamed Ulysse, later renamed Tourville, stricken 1822
  - Santa Isabel 70 (launched 30 April 1767 at Cartagena) - BU 1803
- San Vicente Ferrer Class 80 guns.
  - San Vicente Ferrer 80 (launched 23 April 1768 at Cartagena) - Scuttled 16 February 1797
  - San Nicolás Bari 80 (launched 5 April 1769 at Cartagena) - Captured by Britain at the Battle of Cape St Vincent, 14 February 1797, renamed HMS San Nicholas, sold 1814
  - San Rafael 80 (-) - Destroyed by fire on stocks at Havana 1769
- San Carlos class. Built (all at Havana) as 80-gun warships, with a length of 197 Burgos feet (180 British feet), these ships were later reconstructed as 94-gun warships, (and in the case of the San Carlos, subsequently rebuilt as a three-decker of 112 guns.
  - San Carlos 80-gun (launched 30 April 1765) - Converted to 112-gun three-decker in 1801, BU 1819
  - San Fernando 80 (launched 29 July 1765) - Stricken 8 October 1813 and sold 1815
  - San Luis 80 (launched 30 September 1767) - Stricken 4 August 1789 and BU
- América (or Santiago) 64 (launched 7 August 1766 at Havana) - BU 1823
- San Juan Nepomuceno class all ordered 1763 at Guarnizo (built by contract with Manuel de Zubiria dated 20 September 1763), 74 guns
  - San Juan Nepomuceno 74 (launched 18 October 1766 at Guarnizo) - captured by Britain at the Battle of Trafalgar, 21 October 1805, renamed HMS San Juan, sold 1818
  - San Pascual Bailon 74 (launched 16 December 1766 at Guarnizo) - BU 1797
  - San Francisco de Asis 74 (launched 15 March 1767 at Guarnizo) - Wrecked after the Battle of Trafalgar, 23 October 1805
  - San Lorenzo 74 (launched 10 October 1768 at Guarnizo) - BU 1815
  - San Agustín 74 (launched 9 December 1768 at Guarnizo) - Captured by Portugal 1776, returned 1777, captured and scuttled by Britain at the Battle of Trafalgar, 21 October 1805
  - Santo Domingo 74 (launched 6 December 1769 at Guarnizo) - Blew up at the Battle of Cape St. Vincent, 1780
- San Isidro class both ordered 1766 at Ferrol (Esteiro Dyd), 70 guns
  - San Isidro 70 (launched 2 May 1768 at Ferrol) - Captured by Britain at the Battle of Cape St Vincent, 14 February 1797, sold 1814
  - San Julián 70 (launched 10 December 1768 at Ferrol) - Captured by Britain and recaptured at the Battle of Cape St. Vincent, wrecked 1780
- San Francisco de Paula class ordered 1766 at Havana, 70 guns
  - San Francisco de Paula 70 (launched 12 January 1769 at Havana) - Burned 1784
  - San José 70 (launched 14 December 1769 at Havana) - Wrecked 8 April 1780
- San Rafael 80 (launched 8 August 1771 at Havana) - Captured by Britain at the Battle of Cape Finisterre, 22 July 1805, retaining same name, sold 1810
- Nuestra Señora de la Santísima Trinidad 112, later 120 (1769) - Converted to 130-gun 4-decker in 1796, raised to 136 in 1805, captured by Britain at the Battle of Trafalgar, 1805, sank the next day

== The Second French phase - 1770 to 1783 ==
- San Pedro Apóstol class 68/70 guns
  - San Pedro Apóstol 70 (launched 31 December 1770 at Ferrol) - Stricken 1801
  - San Pablo 70 (launched 15 March 1771 at Ferrol) - Renamed Soberano 1814, BU January 1856
  - San Gabriel 70 (launched 5 March 1772 at Ferrol) - Stricken 10 August 1909
- San Joaquín class
  - San Joaquín (originally begun as San Pedro de Alcántara) 70 (launched 14 June 1771 at Cartagena) - BU 1817
  - San Juan Bautista 70 (launched 1 August 1772 at Cartagena) - Stricken 5 April 1809
  - Ángel de la Guarda 70 (launched 18 September 1773 at Cartagena) - BU 1810
  - San Dámaso 70 (launched 30 March 1776 at Cartagena) - Scuttled 16 February 1797, captured by Britain and refloated, sold 1814
  - San Justo 74 (launched 11 November 1779 at Cartagena) - BU 1824 or 1828
- San Miguel 70 (launched 6 January 1774 at Havana) - Stranded and captured by Britain 11 October 1782, retaining same name, sold 1791
- San Ramón 68 (launched 6 April 1775 at Havana) - Aground in storm and burnt by the French 1810
- San Eugenio 80 (launched 29 June 1775 at Ferrol) - BU 1804
- San Isidoro 64 (ex-Neapolitan, transferred 1776) - Wrecked 26 October 1794
- San Leandro 64 (ex-Neapolitan, transferred 1776) - Sold 1784
- Purísima Concepción class 112 guns
  - Purísima Concepción 112 (launched 24 December 1779 at Ferrol) - Wrecked in storm 9 March 1810 and burnt by the French
  - San José 112 (launched 30 June 1783 at Ferrol) - Captured by Britain at the Battle of Cape St Vincent, 14 February 1797, renamed HMS San Josef, BU 1849
- Miño 54 (launched 1 February 1779 at Ferrol) - BU 1814
- Castilla (or San Félix) 64 (launched 1 February 1779 at Ferrol) - Aground in storm & burnt by the French 1810
- Santo Domingo Class 60 guns
  - Santo Domingo 60 (launched 26 January 1781 at Ferrol) - BU 1807
  - San Felipe Apóstol 60 (launched 22 June 1781 at Ferrol) - Sold to the Netherlands on 8 July 1794, renamed Overijssel, captured by Britain 1795, retaining same name, sold 1822
- San Julián 60 (launched 31 August 1781 at Cartagena) - BU 1830
- San Fermín Class 74 guns
  - San Fermín 74 (launched 29 March 1782 at Pasajes) - BU 1808
  - San Sebastián 74 (launched 16 May 1783 at Pasajes) - transferred to France in May 1799, renamed Alliance, stricken 1807

[Note that the Guipuzcoano 64 - captured by the United Kingdom in 1780 and renamed Prince William - was a private ship of the Real Compañía Guipuzcoana de Caracas, and was not part of the Spanish Navy.]

== The Period of Spanish Consolidation - 1784 to 1807 ==
- Santa Ana class (also called los Meregildos)
  - Santa Ana 112 (launched 29 September 1784 at Ferrol) - Stricken 1812
  - Mejicano (San Hipólito) 112 (launched 20 January 1786 at Havana) - Stricken 8 October 1813 and sold 1815
  - Conde de Regla (Nuestra Señora de Regla) 112 (launched 4 November 1786 at Havana) - Stricken 14 July 1810 and BU 1811
  - Salvador del Mundo 112 (launched 2 May 1787 at Ferrol) - Captured by Britain at the Battle of Cape St Vincent, 14 February 1797, retaining same name, BU 1815
  - Real Carlos (Santiago Apóstol) 112 (launched 4 November 1787 at Havana) - Blew up in action, 12 July 1801
  - San Hermenegildo 112 (launched 20 January 1789 at Havana) - Blew up in action, 12 July 1801
  - Reina Luisa (San Luis) 112 (launched 12 September 1791 at Ferrol) - Renamed Fernando VII 1809, wrecked 10 December 1815
  - Príncipe de Asturias 112 (launched 28 January 1794 at Havana) - Stricken 1812, BU 1814
- Bahama (San Cristóbal) 74 (launched 11 March 1784 at Havana) - Captured by Britain at the Battle of Trafalgar, 21 October 1805, retaining same name, BU 1814
- San Ildefonso class 74 guns - designed by Romero y Landa
  - San Ildefonso 74 (launched 22 January 1785 at Cartagena) - Captured by Britain at the Battle of Trafalgar, 21 October 1805, retaining same name, BU 1816
  - San Antonio 74 (launched 16 July 1785 at Cartagena) - transferred to France on 21 March 1801, renamed Saint Antoine, captured by Britain 1801, renamed San Antonio, sold 1828
  - San Telmo 74 (launched 20 June 1788 at Ferrol) - Lost off Cape Horn 1819
  - Europa San Lesmes) 74 (launched 19 October 1789 at Ferrol) - Stricken 1801
  - Intrépido (San Mateo) 74 (launched 20 November 1790 at Ferrol) - transferred to France 1 July 1801, renamed Intrépide, captured by Britain at the Battle of Trafalgar and sank in storm, 1805
  - San Francisco de Paula 74 (launched 20 December 1788 at Cartagena) - BU 1823
  - Conquistador (San Lucas) 74 (launched 9 December 1791 at Cartagena) - transferred to France 23 April 1802, renamed Conquérant, stricken 1804
  - Soberano 74 (launched 25 August 1790 at Havana) - BU 1809
  - Infante Don Pelayo 74 (launched 22 November 1792 at Havana) - transferred to France 23 April 1802, renamed Desaix, stricken 1804
  - Monarca 74 (launched 17 March 1794 at Ferrol) - Captured by Britain at the Battle of Trafalgar and wrecked in storm, 23 October 1805
- San Fulgencio Class 64 guns, designed by Romero y Landa as "reduced" version of his 74-gun San Ildefonso class.
  - San Fulgencio 64 (launched 3 November 1787 at Cartagena) - Foundered 1814 at Havana
  - San Leandro 64 (launched 27 November 1787 at Ferrol) - Wrecked 1814
  - San Pedro Alcántara 64 (launched 27 June 1788 at Havana) - Burned 24 April 1815
- Asia 68 (launched 9 December 1789 at Havana) - crew mutinied and handed ship over to Mexico 1825, becoming Mexican Congreso Mexicano; BU 1830
- Ferme 74 (1785, ex-French Phocion, defected 1793, ex-Ferme, renamed 1792) - Stricken 1808
- Montañés (Santo Toribio de Mongrobejo) 74, later 80 (launched 14 May 1794 at Ferrol). Designed by Julián Martín Retamosa - Wrecked 9 March 1810.
- Neptuno class. These two ships were ordered at Ferrol in late 1792 and late 1795, both built to the same design () and each actually carried 80 guns.
  - Neptuno (San Francisco Javier) 80 (launched 26 November 1795 at Ferrol) - Wrecked in storm after the Battle of Trafalgar, 23 October 1805
  - Argonauta (San Sebas) 80 (launched 7 July 1798 at Ferrol) - Captured by Britain at the Battle of Trafalgar and sank in storm, 21 October 1805
- Censeur 74 (1782, ex-French, transferred 1799) - BU
- Argonauta 74 (1789, ex-French Argonaute, transferred 1806) - Wrecked 1810
- Neptuno 80 (1803, ex-French Neptune, captured 1808 at Cadiz) - BU 1820
- Héroe 74 (1801, ex-French Heros, captured 1808 at Cadiz) - Stricken 1839
- Algeciras 74 (1804, ex-French Algésiras, captured 1808 at Cadiz) - Stricken 1826
- Plutón 74 (1805, ex-French Pluton, captured 1808 at Cadiz) - Renamed Montañés in 1810, BU 1816
- Emprendedor 86 (-) - BU 1808 or later (never completed)
- Tridente 76 (-) - BU 1808 or later (never completed)
- Real Familia 114 (-) - BU 1808 or later (never completed)

== The Final phase - 1808 to 1854 ==
Spain completed no further ships of the line after 1796 for more than half a century, although three ships were under construction in Ferrol and Havana at the time of the French occupation (work on them ceased and they were all broken up on the stocks), and five 74-gun ships were acquired from Russia in February 1818, although these were in poor condition and were quickly taken to pieces without seeing any service. Finally, two 86-gun ships were ordered in 1850 and laid down on 19 November and 2 December 1850 respectively.

- España 74 (launched 1811 at Arkhangelsk, ex-Russian Nord-Adler, sold to Spain 1818) - Stricken 1821
- Alejandro I 74 (launched 1813 at Arkhangelsk, ex-Russian Drezden, sold to Spain 1818) - Stricken 1823
- Numancia 74 (launched 1813 at Arkhangelsk, ex-Russian Liubek, sold to Spain 1818) - BU 1823
- Velasco 74 (launched 1810 at St Petersburg, ex-Russian Tri Sviatitelei, sold to Spain 1818) - Stricken 1821
- Fernando VII 74 (launched 1812 at St Petersburg, ex-Russian Neptunus, sold to Spain 1818) - Stricken 1823
- Reina Doña Isabel II 86 (launched 13 October 1852 at Carraca) - stricken 18 July 1867 but still extant 1885, BU
- Rey Don Francisco de Asís 86 (launched 18 September 1854 at Ferrol) - Decommissioned 1876, BU

== See also ==
Media related to Ships of the line of Spain at Wikimedia Commons

- List of battleships of Spain
- List of galleons of Spain
- List of Spanish sail frigates
- List of retired Spanish Navy ships
- List of ships built at Ferrol shipyards 1750 – 1881
