= La Chesnaye =

La Chesnaye is a surname. Notable people with the surname include:

- Charles Aubert de La Chesnaye (1632–1702), French financier active in Canada
- Nicolas Filleul de La Chesnaye (1530–1575?), French poet and dramatist
- Nicole de La Chesnaye (fl. early 16th century), French author
