= Spanish ship Galicia (1729) =

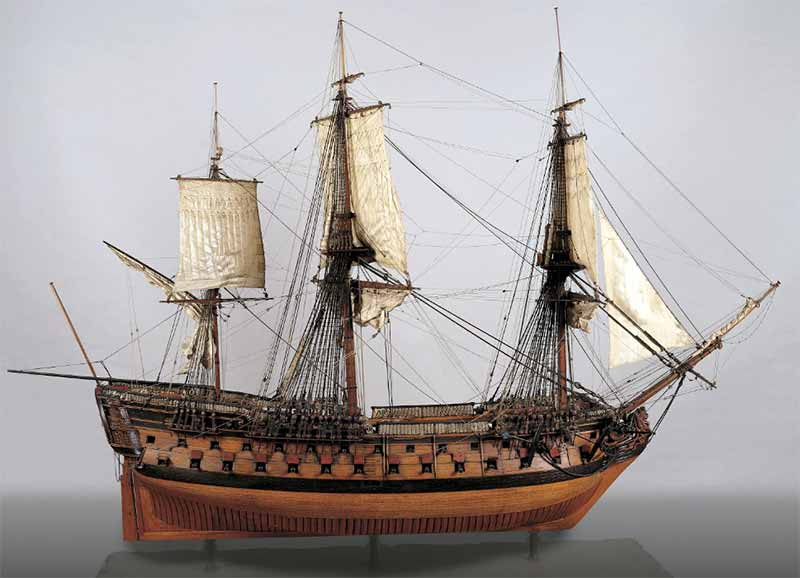
- Two-deck ship of the line. Naval Museum of Madrid.

History

(Spain)
- Name: Galicia
- Operator: Spanish Navy (1730–1741); Royal Navy (1741)
- Builder: Arsenal de La Graña (Ferrol)
- Launched: 28 July 1729
- Commissioned: Spain 26 April 1730; UK 25 March 1741
- Decommissioned: Spain 25 March 1741; UK 28 April 1741
- Fate: Sunk by her captors

General characteristics
- Class & type: Galicia class
- Type: Ship of the line
- Tons burthen: 1,095 tons bm
- Length: 46.18 metres (151 ft 6.11 in) (keel)
- Beam: 13.41 metres (43 ft 11.95 in)
- Draught: 7.49 metres (24 ft 6.88 in)
- Sail plan: Full-rigged ship (Note: A full-rigged ship is a sailing vessel with a full sail plan of three or more masts, all square-rigged. Such a ship has each mast divided into three segments: lower mast, topmast and topgallant mast.)
- Complement: 500 (1731)
- Armament: 70 guns: (1731)

The Galicia, the first ship of the Spanish Navy to bear the name, was a two-deck ship of the line with gunports for 70 nominal guns, although other sources list between 70 and 74 carried guns. The ship was the lead vessel of the Galicia class. Like all Spanish Navy ships of the era with non-religious names, it was placed under the protection of a saint, though there is no documentary evidence. According to British rating standards, the ship was classed as a third-rate ship of the line. Its namesake refers to the former Kingdom of Galicia, part of the Crown of Castile.

== Construction ==
The Galicia was built under the supervision of Lorenzo de Arzueta y Torres, who was entrusted with overseeing its condition. The ship was launched on 28 July 1729. It was the first ship of the Navy built at this Galician yard. However, there is controversy: some authors argue that the first ship built there was the León, of the same class.

The design was by Cipriano Autrán, succeeding Antonio de Gaztañeta e Iturribalzaga (1656–1728). The Galicia was one of nearly fifty ships built between 1724 and 1744, and was considered one of the seven "magnificent, of the Princesa type", along with the Santa Ana, Reina, Príncipe, Princesa, León and San Carlos.

The ship was formally commissioned into the Spanish Navy on 26 April 1730.

== Service history ==
In March 1730, the ship, under Alejandro Chatelein, transported troops from Cádiz to La Coruña, and from there to Barcelona in April. It sailed from Cádiz on 26 May with the ship Santiago and the frigate Fama bound for Barcelona. In July 1731, the ship was at Barcelona with a fleet of 18 ships of the line, 5 frigates and 2 dispatch boats of Esteban de Mari, marquis of Mari or Sr. Mary [sic], gathered for the expedition to Livorno under Miguel de Sada y Antillón, Count of Clavijo, with an armament of 70 guns and 500 men. It returned to Cádiz on 17 December. In 1732, the ship fought piracy and, in June 1732, joined Andalucía, Conquistador and León in the expedition to Oran, under Jacinto Serrano, Count of Bena Masserano. In October, it took part in the expedition against Naples and Sicily, under Clavijo.

In September 1733, the marquis of Ensenada, Zenón de Somodevilla, requested cables for the Galicia and other ships of Antonio Serrano’s squadron to be installed at the Cartagena Arsenal because there were no supplies at Cádiz. The ship was placed in reserve in July 1736.

The ship returned to service at Ferrol with Santa Teresa, Santiago, San Carlos and the transport San Diego. It departed Ferrol on 18 October 1739 with San Carlos bound for Puerto Rico to take part in the War of Jenkins' Ear. The ships reached Cartagena de Indias, where they were besieged by the Royal Navy. On 25 March 1741, the damaged ship was captured by the British and converted into a floating battery, held for just over a month.

On 15 April 1741, her former Spanish crew attempted to scuttle the ship at Cartagena de Indias to block Boca Chica, but the British retained her. Eventually, anticipating withdrawal, the British sank her between 27 and 28 April 1741, as she was no longer usable.

== Service in the United Kingdom ==
The ship was briefly commissioned into the Royal Navy as HMS Galicia, serving as a floating battery, but ran aground. She was burned in May 1741 when the Royal Navy began its withdrawal from Cartagena de Indias.

== See also ==
- List of ships of the line of Spain
- Old Style and New Style dates
