= San Esteban Apedreado =

Spanish Navy Cargo Ship story

History

Spain
- Name: San Esteban Apedreado
- Builder: Lorenzo Arzueta
- Launched: 1726
- Decommissioned: 1744
- Fate: Broken up
- Class & type: Frigate (fifth rate)
- Tons burthen: 625 tons
- Length: 36.28 metres (119.0 ft)
- Beam: 9.31 metres (30.5 ft)
- Depth of hold: 4.68 metres (15.4 ft)
- Propulsion: Sail
- Complement: 350
- Armament: 40 guns

The San Esteban Apedreado was a fifth-rate frigate in the Spanish navy that ran ashore and was damaged in the Rio de la Plata in 1741 and was broken up in 1744 or 1745.

== Construction ==
The San Esteban Apedreado was a fifth-rate frigate built in the Guarnizo shipyard near Santander, Spain, by Lorenzo Arzueta. Its length was 36.28 metres (119.0 ft), its keel 32.59 metres (106.9 ft), its beam 9.31 metres (30.5 ft), and its depth in the hold 4.68 metres (15.4 ft). It displaced 625 tons. It carried eighteen 12-pound guns on the lower gun deck, eighteen 8-pound guns on the upper gun deck, and four 4-pound guns on the quarterdeck. In 1741, it had a crew of 350.

== Career ==
The San Esteban Apedreado was acquired by the Spanish Navy in 1726. In 1730 it was stationed at Havana. It sailed from Havana on 26 May 1731, carrying 4,000,000 pesos, and reached Cádiz on 14 July 1731. In October 1731 it carried troops from Cadiz to Livorno with the fleet of the Marquis del Mari. It returned to Cadiz to be careened in February 1732. The San Esteban Apedreado left Cadiz in 1736 and sailed to Buenos Aires. On 18 August 1736, it was engaged with a Portuguese ship carrying 60 guns for two hours. On 26 August 1736, it captured the Portuguese frigate Madre de Dios. On 15 January 1737, it was back in Buenos Aires. In April of that year, it was in the Rio de la Plata with Hermione, San Francisco Javier, and Paloma Indiana. It left for Spain with the Hermione in 1739 carrying 600,000 pesos. The San Esteban Apedreado and Hermione reached Ferrol, Galicia, in 1740 and entered Cadiz in April 1740.

== Last voyage ==
The San Estéban Apedreado left Ferrol on 7 October 1740 in Vice-Admiral José Alfonso Pizarro's squadron, but was forced back due to bad weather. The squadron left Ferrol again on 21 October 1740. In 1741 a fleet under Commodore Anson left England to attack the coasts of Chile and Peru. The Spanish government ordered General José Pizarro to respond with his squadron consisting of the ships Asia (64), Guipúzcoa (74), Hermione (54) and Esperanza (50) and the frigate San Estéban (40). At the end of February the squadron was just west of Cape Horn when it was dispersed by a violent storm. With continuing poor weather the San Estéban was forced to return to the Rio de la Plata. On the ship's arrival, it ran ashore. The ship had recovered, but had been badly damaged, and was broken up in 1744.
