= Nicole de La Chesnaye =

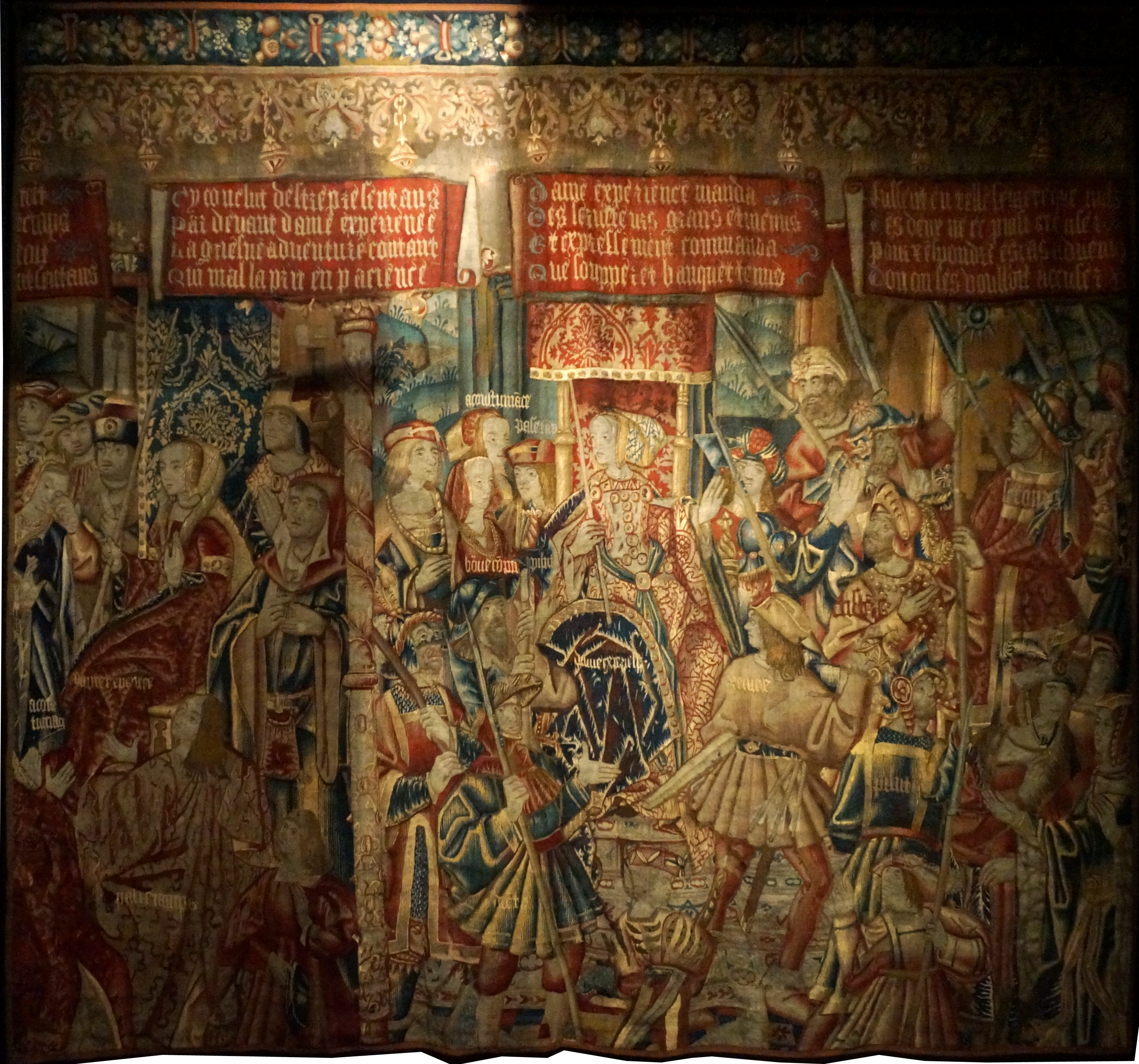
tapestry La Condamnation de Banquet.

Nicole de La Chesnaye (fl. 1507) was a French author of the early 16th century best known for the morality play La Condamnation de Banquet.

His play was adapted as a sharp farce La Mort de Souper by Roger Semichon in 1913 and performed in Paris in 1922 with music by Jeanne Herscher-Clément.
