= San Esteban (1607 shipwreck) =

History

Spain
- Name: San Esteban
- Launched: March 1604
- Stricken: 4 January 1607
- Fate: Wrecked
- Class & type: Galleon
- Tons burthen: 549
- Length: 52.5 metres (172 ft)
- Beam: 16.3 metres (53 ft)
- Draught: 9 metres (30 ft)

The San Esteban was a galleon in the Spanish navy that was wrecked in a storm off the coast of France in 1607.

The San Esteban was a 549-ton galleon of the Spanish navy. She drew 9 metres (30 ft), had a beam of 16.3 metres (53 ft) and was 52.5 metres (172 ft) long. She belonged to the Spanish squadron of Viscaye (Biscay), responsible for the coastal defenses of the north of Spain. She served for 34 months from March 1604 to January 1607.

In the company of eight other vessels traveling from Lisbon to Pasaia, Basque Country, the San Esteban was caught in a storm and drifted onto shore near the bar of Bidart, France. She foundered on 4 January 1607.
